= The Negro in Business =

1907 book by Booker T. Washington

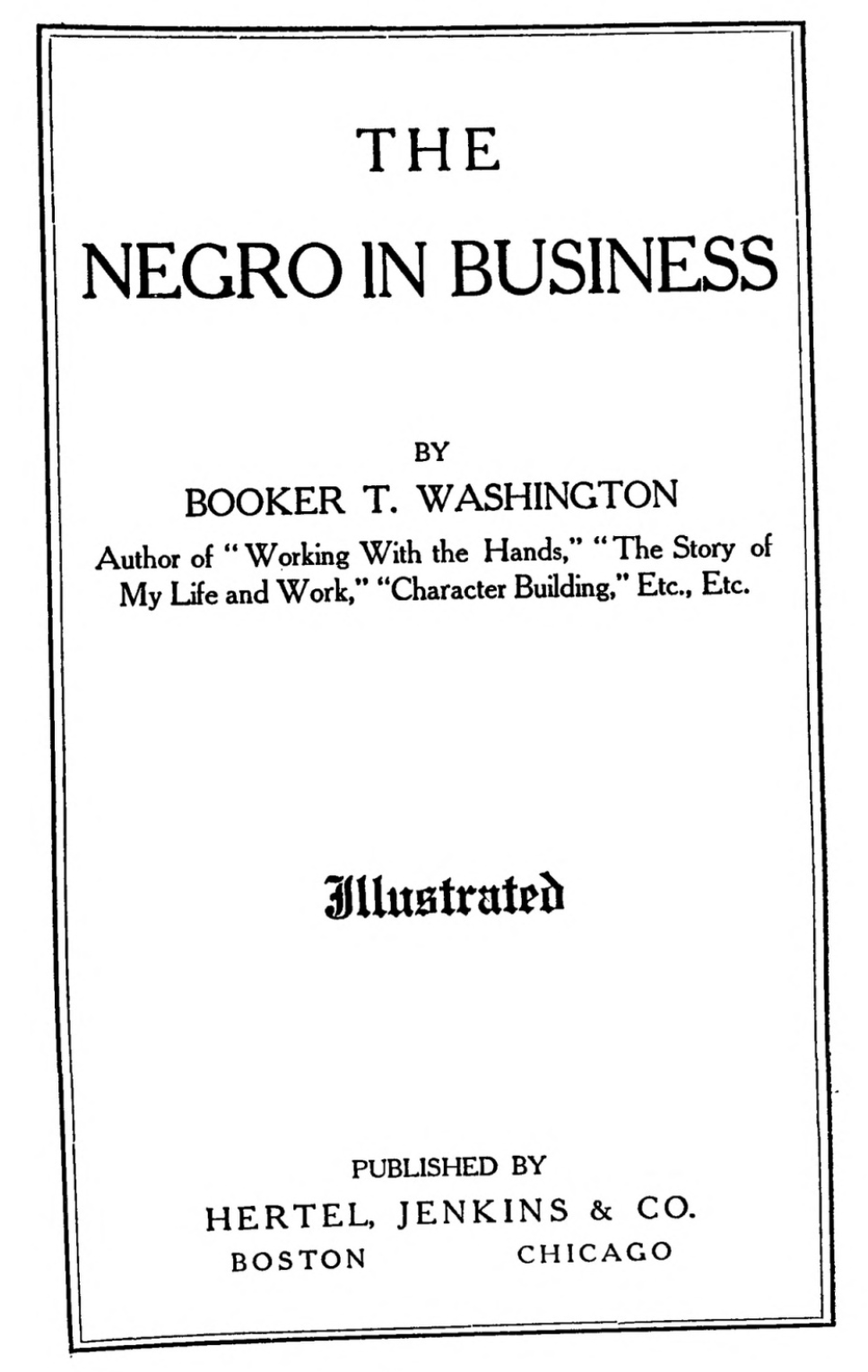
The Negro In Business (1907) cover page

The Negro in Business is a 1907 book by Booker T. Washington published by Hertel, Jenkins & Company. A copy is held by the Smithsonian National Museum of African American History and Culture and the New York Public Library's Schomburg Center for Research in Black Culture.

In 1899, W. E. B. DuBois edited "The Negro in Business", a study of African American businessmen, while a professor at Atlanta University. In 1906 Colver Publishing House and The Colored American Magazine published an article titled "The Negro in Business" by Washington.

Washington and DuBois collaborated on The Negro Problem in 1903 and The Negro in the South in 1907.

Afro-Am Press republished the book in 1969.

== See also ==
- National Negro Business League
