= Wilford Horace Smith =

American lawyer

Wilford H. Smith
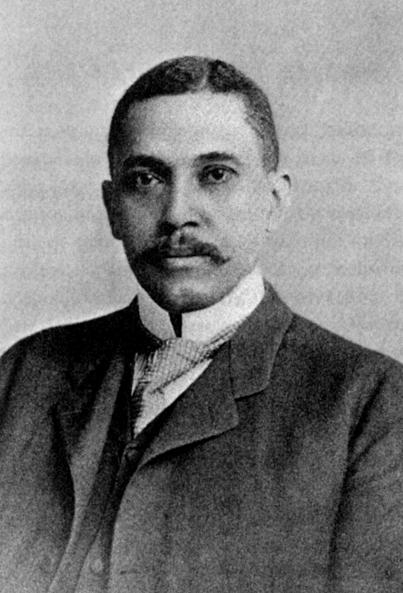
- Wilford H. Smith (from The Negro Problem (1903))
- Born: c. 1863; Mississippi, US
- Died: June 9, 1926; New York City, US
- Occupation: Attorney
- Years active: 1883–1926
- Known for: The first African-American attorney to win a case before the United States Supreme Court

Wilford H. Smith (c. 1863 – June 9, 1926) was an African-American lawyer who was active in Mississippi, Texas, New York and Alabama between 1883 and 1926. In 1900 Smith became the first black attorney to win a case before the United States Supreme Court with Carter v. Texas (177 U.S. 442 (1900)), a case which reinforced the principle that the constitutional rights of black defendants were violated when they were unable to defend themselves against racial discrimination in jury selection. He also won a second jury discrimination case before the Supreme Court, Dan Rogers v. State of Alabama (192 U.S. 226 (1904)), and unsuccessfully argued two voting rights cases, Giles v. Harris (189 U.S. 475 (1903)) and Giles v. Teasley (193 U.S. 146 (1904)), in a bid for recognition that state laws facilitating racially discriminatory practices in voter registration were unconstitutional violations of black men's civil rights. During his long and wide-ranging legal career Smith's clients included Booker T. Washington in the 1900s and 1910s, and Marcus Garvey and the Universal Negro Improvement Association (UNIA) in the early 1920s.

== Education and personal life ==
Wilford Horace Smith was born in Mississippi around 1863. His parents' names are unknown, although according to census records his father was born in Kentucky and his mother in Virginia. During childhood he lived in southwestern Washington County, Mississippi, possibly in the town of Leota. When Smith was fourteen years old, around 1877, he left home to pursue his education. He studied at Wayland Seminary in Washington, DC, where in 1880 he earned a Wayland Prize, and then at the Boston University School of Law, where he graduated cum laude in 1883 with an LL.B. degree. Smith returned to Mississippi and established a law practice in Greenville.

On December 31, 1885, Smith married Laura Compton of Greenville. The Smiths had four children: Pallerfen Keen (born 1886), Naomi (born 1888), Abbie (born c. 1890) and Wendell (born 1892). The two older children died in early childhood.

In January 1895 Smith moved from Mississippi to Galveston, Texas, where he lived and practiced law until 1901. During this period the Smiths sent their children to Washington, DC, for schooling, accompanied by their mother. The 1900 U.S. Census records Wilford Smith living in a Galveston boarding house along with his law clerk, Owen Compton.

In June 1901 the Smiths moved to New York City where Wilford Smith again established a law practice. Records show that the family was together during most of this time, with the exception of 1910–1911 when Laura Smith and the now young adult children lived in Mount Vernon, NY, while Wilford Smith remained in the city. In addition to his legal work, Smith invested in New York City real estate and in 1922 was described by the New York Age newspaper as owning "some of the best property in Harlem."

In late 1921 or early 1922 Smith returned to Texas and reestablished his practice, first in Galveston and finally in Houston. In May 1926 he fell ill with what was described as a "general breakdown" and his daughter brought him back to New York for treatment. Smith died on June 9, 1926 at the Hill Sanatorium in New York City and was buried at Woodlawn Cemetery in the Bronx.

== Legal career ==
Smith's legal career spanned more than three decades and included a wide variety of fields and cases. In Mississippi during the 1880s and 1890s he specialized in pension and bounty cases, assisting Civil War veterans and their survivors in claiming federal benefits. He was remembered as successful and prosperous in this field by W.E. Mollison, one of his peers in Mississippi's small black legal community, but he also faced criticism and multiple legal actions stemming from accusations that he overcharged clients or otherwise took financial advantage of them. In July 1894 he was disbarred from practicing before the United States Department of the Interior as a result of "improper, unprofessional and illegal conduct in accepting exorbitant fees from his clients."

Historian Maxwell Bloomfield describes Smith in Galveston between 1895 and 1901 as a successful attorney who attracted both black and white clients and whose volume of cases was comparable to that of white attorneys in solo practice. In 1901 he served as the Liberian Consul in Galveston. Smith's best-known case during this period was that of Seth Carter, whom he represented on appeal following a conviction for murder. Smith pursued Carter's case to the United States Supreme Court, where he won a new trial for his client by showing that Texas courts had prevented Carter from presenting evidence that black men had been excluded from the grand jury that had indicted him, a violation of Carter's civil rights.

During his years in New York Smith developed an additional specialization in maritime law, earning the designation of Proctor in Admiralty. In 1905 he was appointed by the New York State attorney general as a special deputy attorney general tasked with prosecuting election fraud cases.

Smith's best known cases in this period were the three Supreme Court cases, Giles v. Harris, Giles v. Teasley, and Rogers v. Alabama, for which he was admitted to the bar in Alabama. All of these cases sought to reverse the disfranchisement of black men under Alabama's 1901 state constitution. Smith's civil rights-related work also included participation in the September 1906 effort to free Ota Benga from confinement at the Bronx Zoo, where Benga was being displayed as an exhibit alongside apes in the Monkey House. While no lawsuit was filed in this case, journalist Pamela Newkirk suggests that the threat of one "undoubtedly captured the attention of the Zoological Society's officials" and helped to facilitate Benga's release after 20 days in the zoo. In 1919 Smith represented a group of black chiropodists who had been refused admission to their field's professional organization, the Pedic Society of the State of New York, and won their right to admittance before the New York State Supreme Court Appellate Division.

During his final years of practice in Texas, in 1924 he joined the appeal after a permanent injunction was granted to white Shriners, first in Houston and then nationally, prohibiting black Shriners, an independent organization, from using the name, rituals or symbols of the Shrine movement. At this time he was described by the Houston Informer, an African-American newspaper, as an "eminent local race attorney," and as "one of the foremost appeal lawyers in the country." Smith died before the conclusion of this case, which ultimately went before the United States Supreme Court as Ancient Egyptian Arabic Order v. Michaux (279 U.S. 737 (1929)), and was decided in favor of the black organization.

=== Supreme Court cases ===
==== Carter v. Texas ====
Smith's client in this case, Seth Carter, was a black man from Galveston who had killed his girlfriend and attempted suicide before confessing to the crime. He was convicted of murder in 1898. Carter's attorney, Emanuel Molyneaux Hewlett, asked Smith to join the case on appeal, and Smith won a new trial for Carter.

At Carter's second trial Smith filed a motion to quash the indictment against him because, although black men made up a quarter of Galveston County's registered voters, none had served on the grand jury that indicted Carter. Smith argued that they had been excluded on racial grounds, which previous rulings by the United States Supreme Court had established was a violation of black defendants' civil rights. He offered to submit evidence and call witnesses to show that black men were systematically excluded from Galveston County grand juries. The judge overruled Smith's motions and Carter was again convicted of murder. When Smith appealed the verdict, the Texas Court of Criminal Appeals initially ruled against him on the grounds that Carter had not challenged the composition of the grand jury using the procedure provided by the state's criminal code. The court then acknowledged that, as the grand jury had been empaneled before Carter's arrest, he had had no chance to do so, and ruled against Carter on the grounds that he had not provided evidence of discrimination in the grand jury's composition.

Smith's appeal to the United States Supreme Court was decided on April 16, 1900. The Supreme Court unanimously ruled that the Texas appeals court decision had violated Carter's constitutional rights, holding that the court had erred in its ruling that Smith had failed to provide evidence of discrimination in grand jury composition because the record showed that he had attempted to do so but been prevented by the trial court. Carter then pled guilty to second-degree murder and received a five-year sentence.

==== Alabama cases ====
For these cases Smith, with the financial support of Booker T. Washington, joined an effort by the Colored Men's Suffrage Association of Alabama (CMSAA) to overturn provisions in Alabama's 1901 state constitution that enabled discrimination against black men seeking to register to vote. The constitution, which had been written with the explicit intent of disfranchising black Alabamans, created a two-tier voter registration system. The first category, available only until December 20, 1902, was open to United States military veterans, Confederate veterans, and their descendants—qualifications that few black men had—and to men "who are of good character and who understand the duties and obligations of citizenship under a republican form of government." Men who registered in this category were registered for life. Those who registered later, or who did not qualify for the first category, had to re-register for every election and were subject to literacy, property and employment requirements. Responsibility for registering voters, including determining whether applicants met subjective criteria like being of "good character," was assigned to county-level boards of registrars. Any appeal of the registrars' decisions was sent to the state circuit courts, to be addressed through a jury trial. A group of black postal workers in Montgomery formed the CMSAA after their applications for lifetime voter registration were denied in 1902. The CMSAA president, Jackson Giles, volunteered to serve as the plaintiff for their planned legal challenge. After Smith and Washington heard about their plans, Smith went to Alabama and volunteered to serve as Giles' attorney.

Smith's and Washington's goal was to use Giles' case to challenge the Alabama constitution in the federal courts and ultimately before the United States Supreme Court, but because it technically provided a remedy for those seeking to appeal voter registration denials, Smith was required to begin in the state courts. In 1902 he filed five cases, eventually leading to three Supreme Court appearances:

- His first suit was filed in Alabama Supreme Court in May 1902 as an equity case. He argued that the appeals process for voter registration denials was not realistic at scale, since Alabama only had thirteen circuit courts to potentially hear thousands of appeals before the 1902 elections took place, and that it had been created to effectively place the registrars outside of court oversight. He called on the court to invalidate those provisions of the system that enabled the registrars to exercise discretion in approving or rejecting applicants. The Alabama Supreme Court refused jurisdiction and instructed Smith to file in Montgomery City Court, which had jurisdiction over registrars.
- Smith filed two cases in Montgomery City Court against the Montgomery County Board of Registrars, which would ultimately be combined into the Giles v. Teasley case. On June 14, 1902, he filed a damages suit against the registrars seeking monetary compensation for violation of Giles' civil rights, and on July 1 he filed a mandamus application asking that black Montgomery residents be registered to vote. Historian Lawrence Goldstone notes that in these cases Smith presented evidence "including convention speeches and newspaper articles, census tables, preliminary registration figures, and affidavits" showing intent, opportunity, and discriminatory outcomes. When these cases were heard in the City Court's October session, both were disposed on demurrers. Smith appealed to the Alabama Supreme Court, which ruled against him. His next step was an appeal to the United States Supreme Court through a writ of error, a request for reconsideration of the case due to an error of law. When the Alabama Supreme Court refused to grant the writ of error, Smith successfully petitioned the United States Supreme Court for a hearing.
- In July 1902 Smith added a criminal case with jury discrimination implications like those in Carter v. Texas to his Montgomery cases. Dan Rogers, a black man, was accused of murdering Ben Howard. According to Rogers, the two men were friends and the homicide was accidental. He was convicted of second-degree murder and sentenced to 25 years in prison, and the Alabama Supreme Court upheld the conviction. Smith appealed Rogers' conviction to the United States Supreme Court as a jury discrimination case.
- In late summer 1902 Smith filed a case directly with U.S. District Judge Thomas Goode Jones as a mandamus petition. As with his first case before the Alabama Supreme Court, Smith accepted Alabama's right to set eligibility requirements for voters, but challenged the aspects of the constitution that allowed the registrars to apply the requirements in a discriminatory way. While not granting relief for Giles, Jones sent the case to the United States Supreme Court using a federal procedure allowing judges to refer cases for opinions on jurisdictional issues. This case would be the first heard by the Supreme Court, as Giles v. Harris.

===== Giles v. Harris =====
In this case, submitted February 24, 1903, Smith focused specifically on the role of the registrars and the discretion that Alabama's voter registration system gave them in deciding who was eligible to register. In arguing against this discretion, Smith cited Yick Wo v. Hopkins (118 U.S. 356 (1886)), in which the court's ruling, declaring a San Francisco ordinance establishing safety requirements for buildings housing laundries to be unconstitutional, had hinged on the law's being written in such a way that its administrators had discretion to discriminate against Chinese business owners when issuing licenses. Smith provided evidence showing that Giles had been a victim of discrimination stemming from the role of registrars in the 1901 Alabama constitution's voter registration provisions, arguing that Giles' case met the court's requirements for declaring a law to be in violation of the Fourteenth and Fifteenth Amendments.

Smith also positioned his case as outside the realm of "political questions," because earlier Supreme Court rulings, as well as the text of the Fourteenth Amendment, differentiated between civil rights, which were part of citizenship, and political rights, which could be defined more narrowly. Smith argued that Alabama was within its rights to establish eligibility requirements, but not, in his words, "to restrict the suffrage of the blacks without depriving a single white man of his right to vote." Historian R. Volney Riser notes that "in purely doctrinal terms, Jackson Giles' Supreme Court case was an argument for federal intervention in state affairs and Wilford Smith had good technical reasons to believe he would succeed," based on the Court's demonstrated willingness at that time to intervene in state-level legal matters.

In a 6-3 ruling issued on April 27, 1903, written by Justice Oliver Wendell Holmes Jr., the Court ruled against Giles' request for relief. Scholars describe his reasoning as a misrepresentation of both Smith's arguments and the Court's own practices: Holmes claimed that if Alabama's voter registration system was indeed unconstitutional, a ruling ordering Alabama to register Giles (or all eligible black voters) would involve the court in sustaining the unconstitutional scheme, whereas Smith had requested a ruling on a specific aspect of the system and the Supreme Court had a history of declaring portions of laws to be unconstitutional; Holmes likewise characterized the discriminatory application of the voter registration law as a political question and declared that the Court would not issue a ruling upholding a plaintiff's political rights because the only remedy would be judicial in nature, with the court unable to enforce its ruling without directly intervening in Alabama's governance. In Riser's summation, "Holmes said that the court had jurisdiction but no power, that politics rather than the Constitution dictated his decision, and that a contrary ruling would make the Court party to a fraud." Holmes suggested that Giles might sue Alabama for damages based on his denied application to register. The only other possibility for relief offered by the ruling was the suggestion that black Alabamans might turn to Congress for legislative remediation. In an essay, Smith described this possibility as "their way of disposing of the Negro by sending him elsewhere."

===== Giles v. Teasley =====
Smith presented a petition to the Supreme Court on October 19, 1903, seeking to consolidate Giles' two Montgomery city court cases with Rogers' jury discrimination case. The combined case would link the mandamus case calling for black Montgomery residents to be registered to vote, with the suit for monetary damages, which Holmes in the Giles v. Harris ruling had suggested as a possible path for Giles to pursue, and the jury discrimination case where the precedent of Carter v. Texas applied. Historian R. Volney Riser explains that Smith believed this combination "would make it harder for the Court to dodge a definitive ruling on disfranchisement. In a consolidated case, they could not reject the mandamus petition without overturning recent precedent--something courts are loath to do." Smith's petition was denied; the Court left Rogers out of the combined case and combined the other two cases as Giles v. Teasley.

In an 8-1 ruling by Justice William R. Day on February 23, 1904, the Court ruled that it lacked the jurisdiction to hear Giles' appeal of his defeat in the Alabama courts. The Alabama Supreme Court had rejected Smith's argument that Giles' federal constitutional rights had been violated without providing a reason; Smith's filing asked the Supreme Court to review that decision. Instead the Court concluded that the Alabama decision involved no federal rights. Legal historian Samuel Brenner suggests that Smith made a strategic error in this case, noting that since Holmes had suggested Giles might be able to make a damage claim, "it is not clear why Giles"—which is to say, Smith--"did not refile his suit in the federal court."

===== Rogers v. Alabama =====
In this case, which was decided on January 18, 1904, the Supreme Court focused on procedural issues and did not directly address Smith's argument that the 1901 Alabama constitution, by enabling disfranchisement, excluded otherwise-qualified black men from serving as jurors because of their race. During Rogers' trial Smith had filed a motion to quash the indictment because of racial discrimination in the composition of the grand jury that had indicted Rogers. The state had successfully moved to strike the motion from the record, and the Alabama Supreme Court had rejected Rogers' exception to that decision on the grounds that Smith's motion was too long (under Alabama regulations, striking a pleading that was "unnecessarily prolix, irrelevant, or frivolous" was allowed if the opposing party moved to do so). The Supreme Court rejected Alabama's prolixity argument and ruled that the Carter v. Texas decision applied in this case, overturning the Alabama Supreme Court's judgment and remanding the case to state courts for further action. In his new trial, Rogers was convicted of first-degree manslaughter and sentenced to five years in prison, of which he served three years and ten months.

==== Significance ====
===== Voter registration cases =====
Constitutional law scholar Richard H. Pildes has argued that Giles v. Harris "is surely one of the most momentous decisions in United States Supreme Court history and one of the most revealing," and historian R. Volney Riser described the case as "Plessy v. Ferguson's twin pillar, completing the legal structure upon which Jim Crow stood," because it showed that the Supreme Court would apply its policy of not enforcing political rights even in what Pildes calls "a context that presented the most radical threat to the constitutional order that the Court had faced under the Fifteenth Amendment."

Together, Giles v. Harris and Giles v. Teasley demonstrated to the opponents of disfranchisement that black men could not rely on the federal courts to protect their constitutional rights. At the same time, even though neither case ruled directly on Smith's constitutional arguments, they provided a road map for state-level politicians seeking to enact discriminatory laws by providing examples of the arguments that the Supreme Court would accept from states and the behaviors it would allow. Although the Supreme Court had heard other disfranchisement cases in the 1890s, they had been dismissed based on jurisdictional or evidentiary flaws in the plaintiffs' arguments, leaving politicians who wanted to enact disfranchising legislation unsure of their legal footing in doing so. Pildes suggests that Smith's work to ensure that his cases lacked those weak spots meant that the rulings in the Giles cases, by refusing to overturn Alabama's registrar system, provided clear guidance in a way that the earlier cases had not.

===== Jury discrimination cases =====
After the Carter and Rogers cases were decided, Smith published an essay, "The Negro's Right to Jury Representation," addressed to "the Colored People of the South." In it, he encouraged them to appeal guilty verdicts in cases where qualified black men had been excluded from juries due to their race. Smith described the cases as upholding an important legal right, writing, "in most communities of the South you have no representation in the making of the law, and for that reason you should not fail to avail yourselves of the right to have a voice in its administration." He argued that the assertion of black men's right to participate in juries was "for manhood rights under the law, which you cannot neglect with safety to the liberty of yourselves and your children."

Scholars have found that the Carter v. Texas decision had limited impact as a precedent because the ruling focused narrowly on Smith's having been prevented from presenting evidence of discrimination against his client. The ruling did not change the established Supreme Court standard for proof that discrimination had occurred, the "intent doctrine," which required direct, explicit evidence that officials had intentionally discriminated while carrying out their duties. For this reason, historian Lawrence Goldstone describes the case as a "largely symbolic" victory.

In 1919 the Chicago Defender reported on rumors that Smith would be traveling to Arkansas to defend black men sentenced to death after the Elaine Massacre, on jury discrimination grounds. This rumor was not accurate, as Smith was not involved in the Elaine Massacre cases, but illustrates the extent to which Smith's name remained connected to the topic of jury discrimination.

==== Status as an African-American pioneer ====
With Carter v. Texas, Smith became the first African-American attorney to win a case before the United States Supreme Court, sharing the distinction with his co-counsel Emanuel Molyneaux Hewlett. With Carter Smith also became the fourth black attorney to present a case before the Court. In this category he was preceded by Everett J. Waring, who became the first black attorney to argue a case before the Court in 1890 with Jones v. United States (137 U.S. 202 (1890)), and by Hewlett and Cornelius J. Jones, who collectively became the second black attorneys to do so on December 13, 1895 with the linked cases Gibson v. Mississippi (162 U.S. 565 (1896)) and Charley Smith v. Mississippi (162 U.S. 592 (1896)).

=== Booker T. Washington and Smith's legal career ===
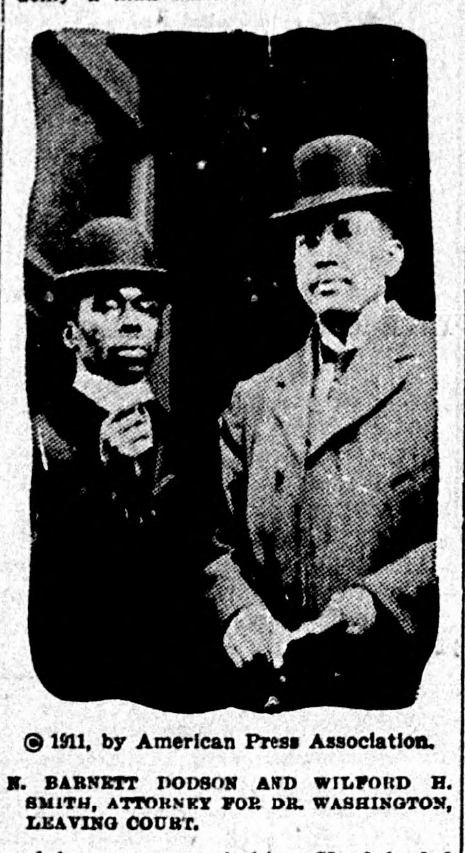
Smith (right) with journalist N. Barnett Dodson outside a New York City courthouse in 1911, while Smith was representing Booker T. Washington in legal matters related to an attack on Washington in 1911.

Smith was introduced to Booker T. Washington by Washington's deputy Emmett Scott, who knew Smith as a fellow member of the small black professional community in southeast Texas. Scott arranged for Smith to attend a conference at Tuskegee in 1897, and recommended that Washington put Smith's name forward as a candidate for the position of Liberian consul in Galveston. After Smith's success in Carter v. Texas, Scott consulted with Smith regarding a possible challenge to Louisiana's new Jim Crow voting laws by the Afro-American Council (AAC), a civil rights organization backed by Washington. Smith recommended that the AAC focus on the law's suffrage provisions and enforcement and identify a literate, propertied black man who had been refused voter registration as their plaintiff. This research did not result in a legal challenge, but the project brought Smith into the small group of people who were aware of Washington's support for black men's voting rights and his participation in the loosely-organized movement to prevent disfranchisement, work that Washington undertook privately and clandestinely to avoid alienating his wealthy white supporters.

Washington secretly provided more than $3000 in financial support to Smith for the Alabama cases, allowing Smith to represent Jackson Giles without taking payment from him or his organization, the Colored Men's Suffrage Association of Alabama (CMSAA). After Smith's defeat in Giles v. Teasley, Washington's decision to discontinue funding meant that Smith was not able to pursue further cases with Giles.

In 1903 Smith's essay "The Negro and the Law" appeared in the Washington-edited anthology The Negro Problem. Following the campaign in the courts, Washington encouraged Smith to write "The Negro's Right to Jury Representation," which was circulated in newspapers in 1904 and republished in 1909 by the Committee of Twelve for the Advancement of the Interests of the Negro Race, a Washington-directed organization whose publications were financed by Andrew Carnegie.

Smith represented Washington in several legal matters. In 1903 Smith participated in Washington's efforts to damage a political opponent, Boston newspaper editor William Monroe Trotter. After Trotter's Guardian newspaper criticized an oration given by Yale student William Pickens, Smith persuaded Pickens to sue Trotter and his co-editor for libel, which Pickens did with Smith's and Washington's support. Smith represented Washington in the court case stemming from an attack on Washington in New York City in March 1911.

=== Racial solidarity and self-help activities ===
Smith repeatedly combined his legal work with other activities focused on racial solidarity, uplift, and self-help. In 1899 Smith was one of the incorporators of a new Colored Farmers' Union, a branch of the Colored Farmers' National Alliance and Cooperative Union, in Bobbin (Dobbin), Montgomery County, Texas. In 1903 he was among the founders of the Liberian Trading Company in New York City and served as its attorney. Its promotional literature described the company as a venture designed to establish trade between the United States and Africa, and described the advantages it "afforded the colored race for bettering its condition financially and placing itself on a sure commercial basis."

In 1904 Smith became an officer of the Afro-American Realty Company (AARC), serving as its attorney. The AARC, which managed apartment buildings in Harlem, was established to overcome customary residential segregation in New York by creating housing options outside the limited areas then open to black renters. It promised that "respectable, law-abiding" African Americans would be able to rent any place that they could afford. In 1906 Smith, acting on behalf of a group of 43 AARC shareholders, sued the company and its managing partner Philip A. Payton for fraud, alleging that Payton had misrepresented the company's holdings and the strength of its financial positions. The AARC, although not Payton as an individual, was found guilty of misrepresentation in 1907, allowing the plaintiffs to recover their investments. The company collapsed in 1908.

==== Smith and UNIA ====
In 1920 Smith was a signatory to UNIA's Declaration of the Rights of the Negro Peoples of the World. By 1921 he had become the organization's Counsellor-General. He represented UNIA leader Marcus Garvey as his personal attorney in his divorce from his first wife, Amy Ashwood Garvey, and court filings show that during 1920 Smith earned $7000 in his combined role as UNIA's and Garvey's attorney, which MeasuringWorth calculates was equivalent to $110,000 in 2024 dollars. Smith was also attorney for UNIA's Black Star Line and a member of its board of directors. In his closing statement during his 1923 trial on mail fraud charges, Garvey described Smith's role at the Black Star Line as including provision of "some kind of check on the use of Garvey's name" when other officers tried to act in Garvey's name without his authorization during his absences from headquarters.

As an officer Smith spoke publicly at UNIA meetings on topics including the economic, political and civic opportunities open to black Americans in Africa, specifically in Liberia; the importance of unity among black peoples around the world; and the lack of real citizenship for black people living in white-controlled countries like the United States.

Smith resigned his positions with UNIA in late 1921 or early 1922, prior to Garvey's arrest in January 1922.

== Political and civic activities ==
Smith participated in local and state-level politics as a Republican throughout his career. In Mississippi in the early 1890s he was part of a Republican faction led by James Hill, and sought the 1890 Republican nomination for Mississippi's Third Congressional district. He lost that contest to the candidate from the opposing Lynch-Bruce faction of the party. In 1890 he also joined other black Mississippi Republicans to lobby Congress and President Benjamin Harrison in favor of federal control of levees, a major issue in the Mississippi Delta region. In Galveston he was locally active as a Republican, and in New York he participated in local Republican clubs and in 1920 unsuccessfully sought the party's nomination for the Twenty-First Congressional district.

During the 1900s he was a member of the National Negro Business League. He belonged to fraternal organizations including the Odd Fellows and the Colored Knights of Pythias. After the Hurricane of 1900 in Galveston, he was part of the relief committee that distributed funds collected by the Texas Grand Lodge of the Colored Knights of Pythias to members of the Galveston lodges who were in need. Smith also coordinated work by black volunteers to clear debris from the city after the hurricane.

At times he participated in activities organized by social reform groups. In New York in 1905 he was a member of a subcommittee of the New York Charity Organization Society's Committee on the Prevention of Tuberculosis that focused on preventing the disease among African Americans in New York. At this time he was also the chair of the Employment Agency Committee for a citywide association established by the Inter-Municipal Committee on Household Research, a research group focused on domestic workers and unemployed women. This project was designed to assist black women in New York, particularly domestic workers and new arrivals from the southern United States.
