= Leota, Mississippi =

- Ghost town
- Location within Mississippi
- Coordinates: 33°06′16″N 91°04′34″W
- Country: United States
- State: Mississippi
- County: Washington
- Elevation: 115 ft (35 m)
- Time zone: UTC-6 (Central (CST))
  - Summer (DST): UTC-5 (CDT)
- GNIS feature ID: 687243

Leota is a ghost town located in Washington County, Mississippi, United States. The settlement, along with its river port Leota Landing, were at one time located directly on the Mississippi River.

== History ==
Both Leota and Leota Landing were established on the Leota Plantation, founded in 1825 by Isaac Worthington. The plantation was located a few miles north on the Mississippi River from the former county seat of Princeton.

The plantation was named by Worthington's daughter Annie, after a favorite fictional character.

Leota was a leading river port between Memphis, Tennessee and Vicksburg, Mississippi, and was a shipping point for cotton.

Leota was incorporated in 1882.

The settlement had a post office, and a population of 50 in 1900.

Little remains of the settlement, which is today covered by forest and a portion of the Mississippi River levee.

== Notable people ==
- Wilford Horace Smith - The first black lawyer to win a case before the Supreme Court of the United States.
