= The Negro Problem =

Collection of essays edited by Booker T. Washington

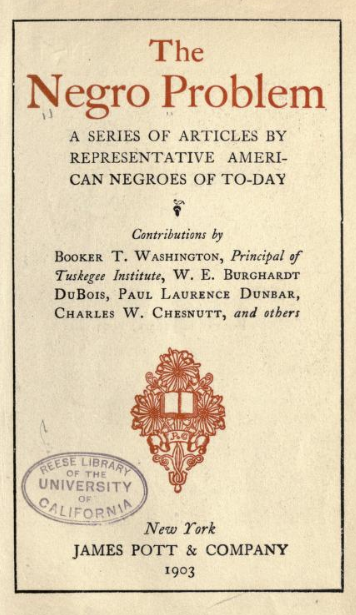
- Title page for The Negro Problem (1903)
- Authors: Booker T. Washington; W. E. B. Du Bois; Charles W. Chestnutt; Wilford H. Smith; H.T. Kealing; Paul Laurence Dunbar; T. Thomas Fortune
- Language: English
- Publisher: J. Pott & Company
- Publication date: 1903
- Publication place: United States

The Negro Problem is a collection of seven essays by prominent Black American writers, such as W. E. B. Du Bois and Paul Laurence Dunbar, edited by Booker T. Washington, and published in 1903. It covers law, education, disenfranchisement, and Black Americans' place in American society.

Like much of Washington's own work, the tone of the book was that Black Americans' social status in the United States was a matter of personal responsibility, but it also confronted issues of legal and social racism. While this represented the point of view of the authors at the time, some—Du Bois, for example—would later revise their stance to consider the effects of systemic and institutional racism. Washington and Du Bois were again reunited in the 1907 collection The Negro in the South.

== Background ==
The Negro Problem and its constituent essays were written in the post-Civil War, Jim Crow era, when African Americans struggled with oppressive laws and systems meant to curb their rights. As White leaders in both the South and the North worked to promote white supremacy, Black leaders sought to redefine and improve their image and identity, through racial uplift ideology. As such, the essays within The Negro Problem reflect this desire for Black uplift.

Booker T. Washington and W.E.B. DuBois, two of the more notable authors featured in The Negro Problem, had a long professional history both preceding and following the publication of the book. Their clashing ideologies led to immense discourse between both the authors and those subscribing to their ideologies. For example, following Washington's Atlanta address, now known as the Atlanta Compromise, DuBois responded with his own address, touching on what DuBois believed to be the weaknesses in Washington's argument. Later, while Washington delivered another speech, a man interrupted him, resulting in the man's arrest. DuBois advocated for the man, while Washington held that he should remain in jail. Other such disagreements built between the two authors in the years preceding the publication of The Negro Problem.

Charles W. Chesnutt also had a long professional history preceding and following the publication of The Negro Problem. He was widely known for his first nationally recognized short story, "The Goophered Grapevine," which was the first short story written by a Black person that appeared in The Atlantic Monthly. In 1883, Chesnutt and his family relocated to Cleveland, Ohio. There he passed the state bar examination and established his own court reporting firm. Chesnutt continued to write and publish stories during the latter years of his life but he was largely eclipsed in the 1920s by the writers of the Harlem Renaissance.

Wilford Horace Smith was an American lawyer who specialized in constitutional law. He was the first African American lawyer to win a case before the Supreme Court of the United States.

== Essays ==
- "Industrial Education for the Negro" by Booker T. Washington
  - Washington argues that the best method to uplift the Black race is to promote accumulation of hard, industrial skills, to improve their economic position. Although he states that he doesn't want Black Americans to be turned away from other pursuits, he believed that the best path to liberation was through breaking into the economy.
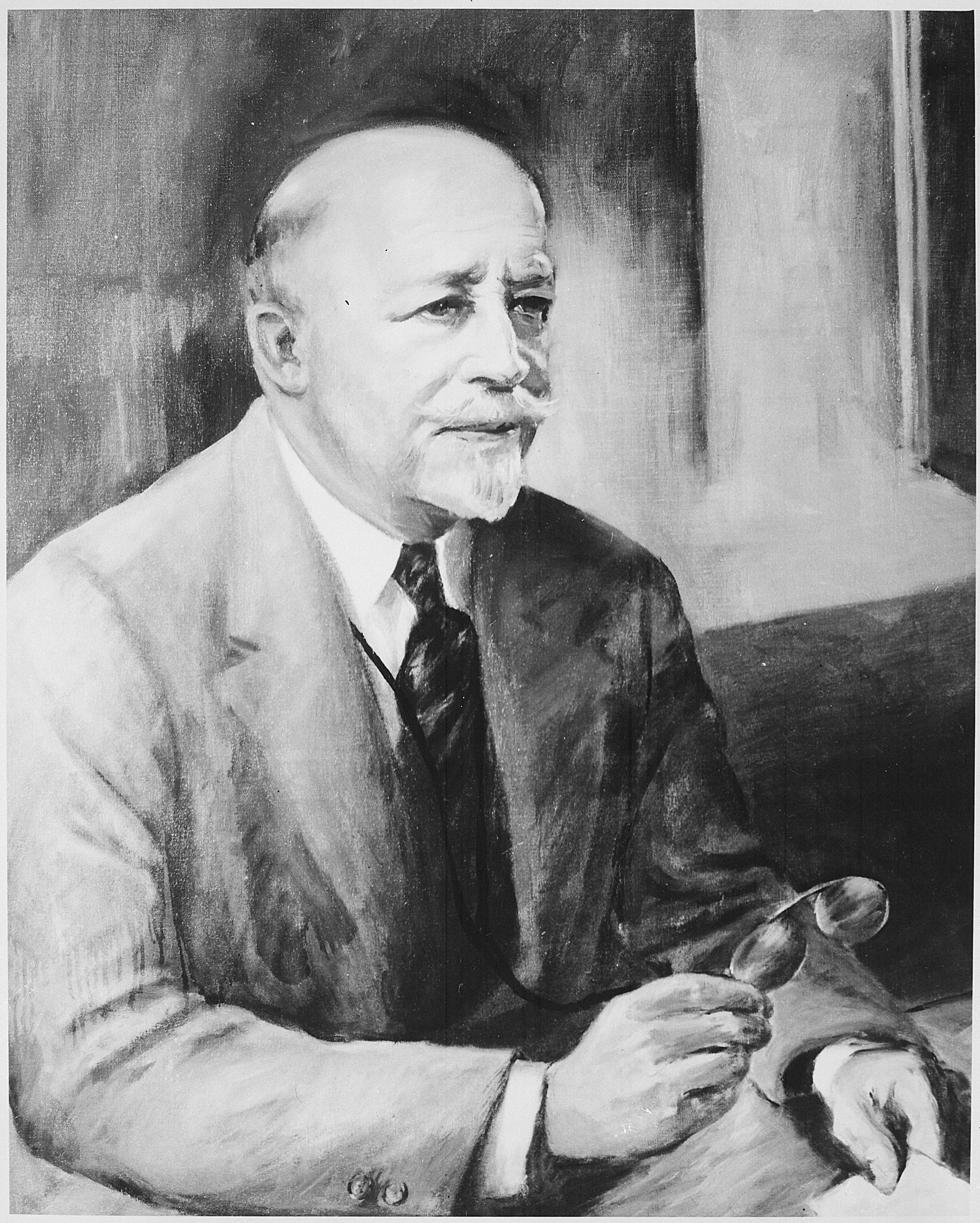
    Pictured: W.E.B. DuBois, author of "The Talented Tenth" and several other works. Ilustrated by Laura Wheeler Waring.
- "The Talented Tenth" by W. E. B. DuBois
  - DuBois argues that the best method to uplift the Black race is to bolster the efforts and education of the most bright, talented individuals, that they might both represent the race and use those talents to then uplift the less gifted. DuBois advocated for a classical education for the Black individuals with the greatest potential, rather than an industrial education, which he viewed as inadequate.
- "The Disfranchisement of the Negro" by Charles W. Chesnutt
  - Chesnutt argues that the disfranchisement of African Americans is a violation of the U.S. Constitution, and goes into depth examining various laws promoting this disfranchisement, calling for political action.
- "The Negro and the Law" by Wilford Horace Smith
  - Smith argues that African Americans are indebted to the generous provisions of the 13th, 14th, and 15th amendments to the Constitution of the United States as a means for their freedom and citizenship, and goes into depth about each amendment's impact on African Americans.
- "The Characteristics of the Negro People" by Hightower Theodore Kealing
  - Kealing argues that there are two kinds of characteristics of Negro people, inborn and inbred. He describes inborn characteristics as native qualities that cannot be destroyed while inbred characteristics are learned as a result of experience.
- "Representative American Negroes" by Paul Laurence Dunbar
  - Dunbar shares the achievements and work of who he calls "Representative American Negroes," drawing what he refers to as the largest and most successful picture of colored people.
- "The Negro's Place in American Life at the Present Day" by T. Thomas Fortune
  - Fortune argues that the place of the Negro in American life depends entirely on the point of view and that African Americans have little knowledge of their ancestry.

== In popular culture ==
- Talented 10th, an album by Christian hip-hop artist Sho Baraka, is based on the essay by DuBois
- In Season 3, Episode 4 of Community, Troy Barnes states one of the steps of a book about how to be the perfect party host which is "avoid touchy topics like 'The Negro Problem'".
- The Negro Problem, a group of four Baroque pop musicians, was named after the book.
