= Character Building =

1902 book by Booker T. Washington

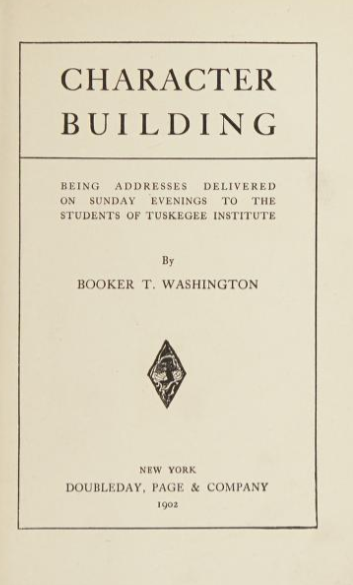
- Title page for Character Building (1902)
- Author: Booker T. Washington
- Language: English
- Genre: Self-development
- Publisher: Doubleday, Page & Co.
- Publication date: 1902
- Publication place: United States

Character Building is a book by Booker T. Washington. It is a collection of thirty-seven talks on self-development given on Sunday evenings to students, faculty, and visitors at the Tuskegee Normal and Industrial Institute, later named Tuskegee University, which Washington delivered himself.

== Major themes ==
1. Self-Analysis
2. Honesty
3. Service
4. Education
5. Personal Growth

== Format ==
This book begins with the Publisher's explanation followed by the preface and contents. Instead of being organized by traditional chapters, the book is separated by talks no longer than ten pages each.

== Notable speeches ==
"Two sides of life" (pp. 3–10) focuses on themes such as optimism and pessimism. In this talk Washington establishes a connection between seeking the best things in life and seeking intelligence. He claims that if one person takes the time to look for the best things in life, no matter the setting, then that person will unintentionally seek intelligence.

"Have You Done Your Best" (pp. 43–39) was delivered during the middle of the school year. It was intended to engage listeners' to examine and analyze their own conscience. He asked rhetorical questions to guide the listeners self-analysis. The talk concluded with the theme that it is not too late to do what needs to be done.

"What Is To Be Our Future" (pp. 165–172) focuses on the future of the African American race. He insists that using education and learned skills will ensure that the race as a whole will be respected.

"A Penny Saved" (pp. 267–276) has a theme of financial responsibility specifically for the African American race. He insists that the race cannot comfortably stand alone until they master saving habits.

"The Gospel Of Service" (pp. 149–155) focuses on the importance of service and giving back. This speech does have a religious tone mentioning Christ's admonition to serve.

"Getting On in the World" (pp. 213–216) focuses on making ones self valuable to others. Washington states that no matter the occasion if someone makes themselves useful and valuable to others, then in return they will have a calling to better opportunities without having to actively seek them.

"On Influencing By Good Example" (pp. 27–32) urges listeners and readers to stray away from gambling and drinking. He insists that these things harm a person's personal reputation, their school's reputation, and even their race's reputation. Washington urges listeners and readers to always set a good example, no matter the setting.

"What Will Pay" (pp. 87–93) focuses heavily on honesty. Washington presents many different examples to further prove that honesty will pay off in the future.

== Adaptations ==
In 2013 it was republished by Transaction Publishers that includes an introduction written by Tim Mealiff. The introduction dives deep into Booker T. Washington's life. It focuses heavily on the many different historical interpretations of Washington's life including his own "Up from Slavery" and "The Story of My Life and Work". It covers other biography written about him such as: "Booker T. Washington: Builder of A Civilization" by Emmett J. Scott and Lyman Beecher Stowe, "Booker T. Washington: Educator and Interracial Interpreter" by Basil Mathews, "Booker T. Washington and The Negro's Place In American Life" by Samuel R. Spencer Jr., and "Negro Thought In America" by August Meier.

On October 13, 2019 Project Gutenberg released the full text on their website. This is a free online version of the original text.

== Audio adaptations ==
There are many different audio version of this text available to the public for free. LibriVox published their audio read by Luke Sartor and has a running time of six hours, thirty-seven minutes, and fifty-nine seconds on their website and on YouTube. There are also audio recordings on Audible, but would have to be purchased.
