= Talented tenth =

1903 essay by W. E. B. Du Bois

The talented tenth is a term that designated a leadership class of African Americans in the early 20th century. Although the term was created by white Northern philanthropists, it is primarily associated with W. E. B. Du Bois, who used it as the title of an influential essay, published in 1903. It appeared in The Negro Problem, a collection of essays written by leading African Americans and assembled by Booker T. Washington.

== Historical context ==
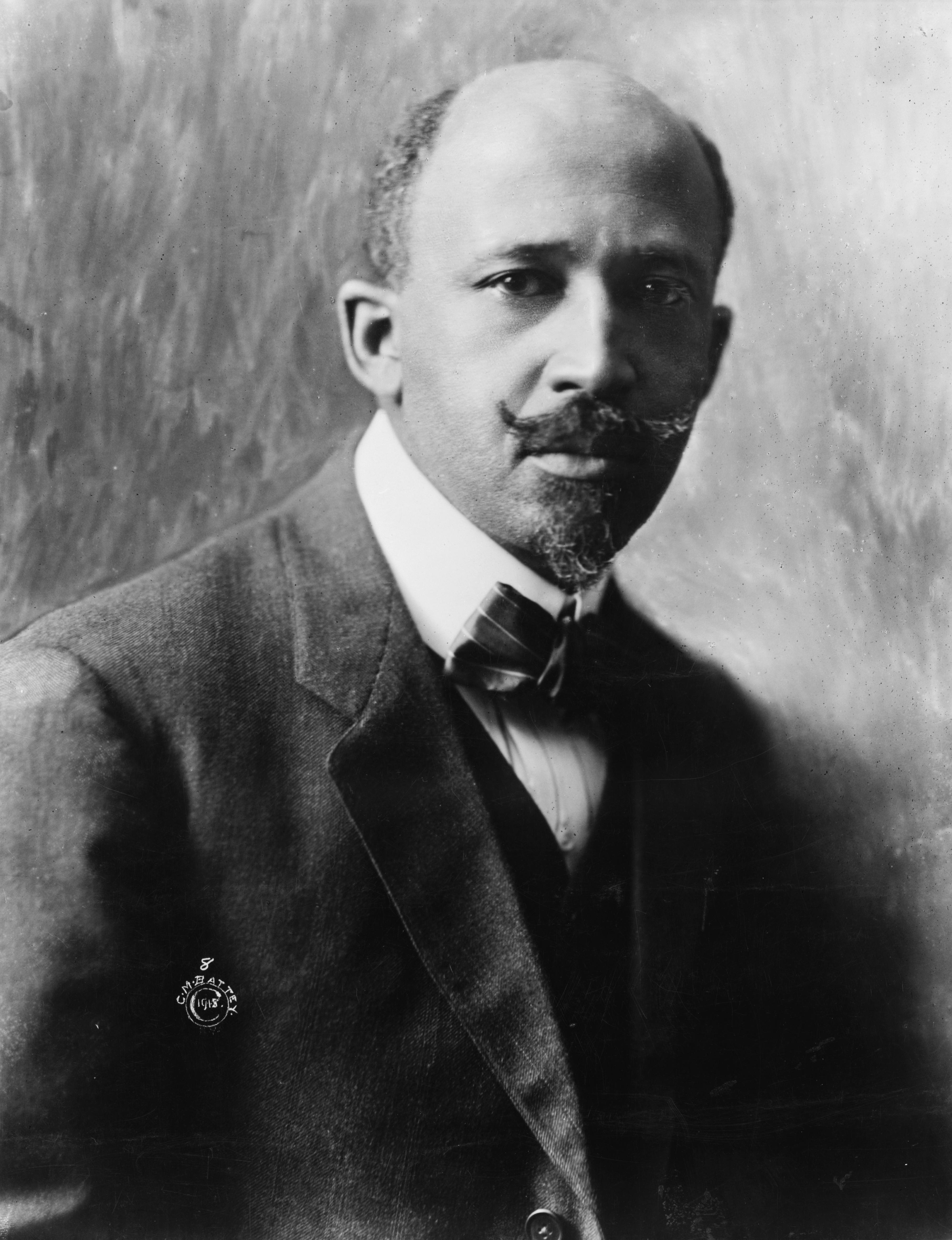
W.E.B Du Bois

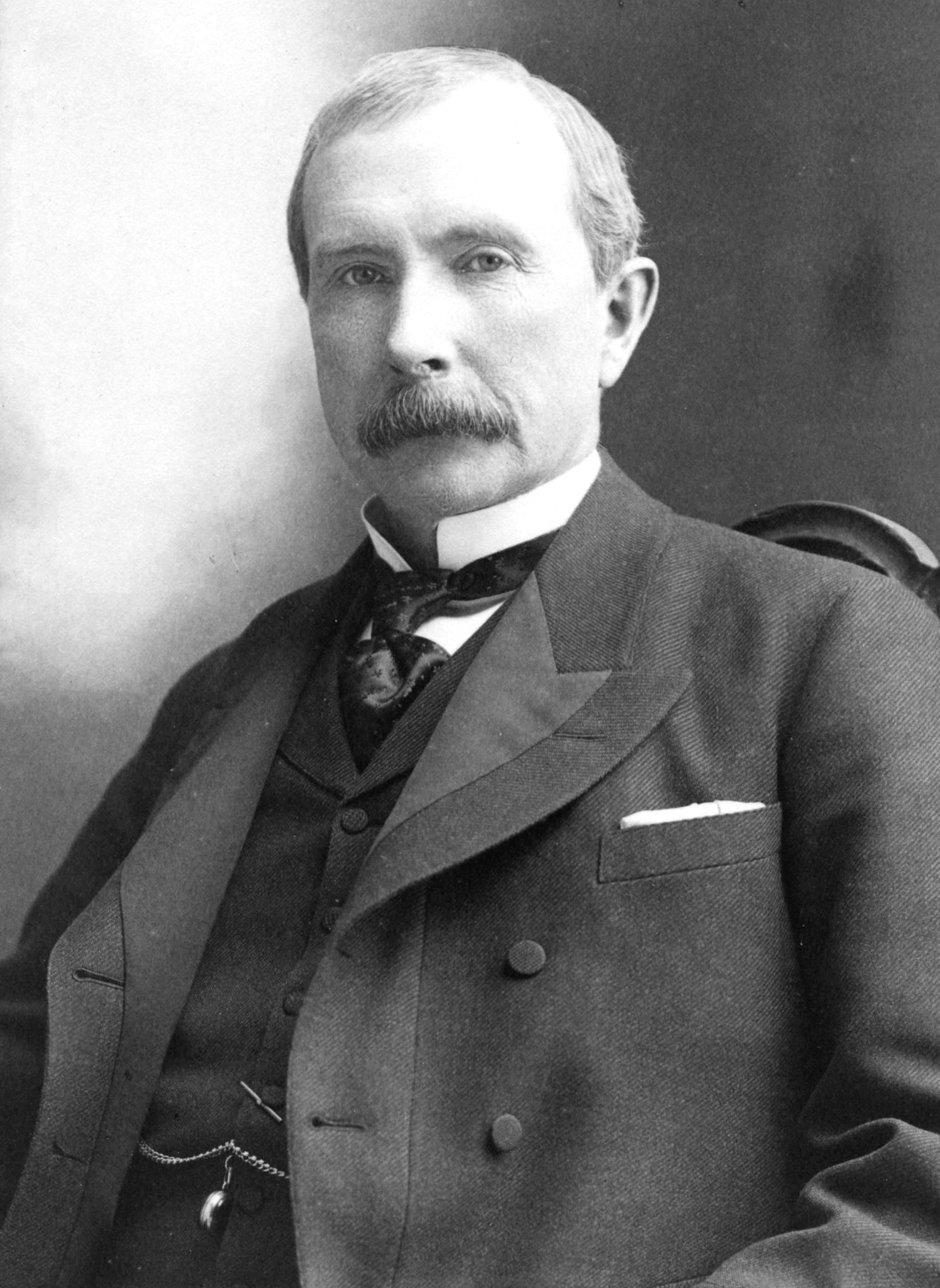
John D. Rockefeller funded the ABHMS, which promoted "Talented Tenth" ideology

The phrase "talented tenth" originated in 1896 among White Northern liberals, specifically the American Baptist Home Mission Society, a Christian missionary society strongly supported by John D. Rockefeller. They had the goal of establishing Black colleges in the South to train Black teachers and elites. In 1903, W.E.B. Du Bois wrote The Talented Tenth; Theodore Roosevelt was president of the United States and industrialization was skyrocketing. Du Bois thought it was a good time for African Americans to advance their positions in society.

The "Talented Tenth" refers to the one in ten Black men that have cultivated the ability to become leaders of the Black community by acquiring a college education, writing books, and becoming directly involved in social change. In The Talented Tenth, Du Bois argues that these college educated African American men should sacrifice their personal interests and use their education to lead and better the Black community.

He strongly believed that the Black community needed a classical education to reach their full potential, rather than the industrial education promoted by the Atlanta Compromise, endorsed by Booker T. Washington and some White philanthropists. He saw classical education as the pathway to bettering the Black community and as a basis for what, in the 20th century, would be known as public intellectuals:

Men we shall have only as we make manhood the object of the work of the schools—intelligence, broad sympathy, knowledge of the world that was and is, and of the relation of men to it—this is the curriculum of that Higher Education which must underlie true life. On this foundation we may build bread winning, the skill of hand and quickness of brain, with never a fear lest the child and man mistake the means of living for the object of life.

In his later life, Du Bois came to believe that leadership could arise on many levels, and grassroots efforts were also important to social change. His stepson David Du Bois tried to publicize those views, writing in 1972: "Dr. Du Bois' conviction that it's those who suffered most and have the least to lose that we should look to for our steadfast, dependable and uncompromising leadership."

Du Bois writes in his Talented Tenth essay that:

The Negro race, like all races, is going to be saved by its exceptional men. The problem of education, then, among Negroes must first of all deal with the Talented Tenth; it is the problem of developing the Best of this race that they may guide the Mass away from the contamination and death of the Worst.

Later in Dusk of Dawn, a collection of his writings, Du Bois redefines this notion, acknowledging contributions by other men. He writes that "my own panacea of an earlier day was a flight of class from mass through the development of the Talented Tenth; but the power of this aristocracy of talent was to lie in its knowledge and character, not in its wealth."

== Du Bois and betterment ==
Du Bois believed that college educated African Americans should set their personal interests aside and use their education to better their communities. To him, this meant that the "Talented Tenth" should seek to acquire elite roles in politics. By doing so, Black communities could have representation in government, allowing college educated African Americans to take "racial action."

That is, Du Bois believed that segregation was a problem that needed to be dealt with, and having African Americans in politics would start the process of dealing with it. He also believed that an education would allow one to pursue business endeavors that would better the economic welfare of Black communities, and would also encourage White people to see Black people as more equal to them, thus encouraging integration and allow African Americans to enter the mainstream business world.

== The "Guiding Hundredth" ==
In 1948, Du Bois revised his "Talented Tenth" thesis into the "Guiding Hundredth". This revision was an attempt to democratize the thesis by forming alliances and friendships with other minority groups that also sought to better their conditions in society. Whereas the "Talented Tenth" only pointed out problems that African Americans were facing in their communities, the "Guiding Hundredth" would be open to mending the problems other minority groups were encountering as well. Moreover, Du Bois revised this theory to stress the importance of morality. He wanted the people leading these communities to have values synonymous with altruism and selflessness. Thus, when it came to who would be leading these communities, Du Bois placed morality above education.

The "Guiding Hundredth" challenged the proposition that the salvation of African Americans should be left to a select few. It reimagined the concept of Black leadership from "The Talented Tenth" by combining racial, cultural, political, and economic ideologies. Without much success, Du Bois tried to keep the idea of education around, taking on a new view that education was a gateway to new opportunities for all people. However, it was viewed as a step in the wrong direction, a threat of reverting to the old ways of thinking, and continued to promote elitism. This revision was also Du Bois's attempt at creating a program for African Americans to follow after World War II, to strengthen their "ideological conscience."

Du Bois emphasized forming alliances with other minority groups because it helped promote equality among all Black people. Both "The Talented Tenth" and "The Guiding Hundredth" exhibit the idea that a plan for political action would need to be evident in order to continue to speak to large populations of Black people. In Du Bois's view, Black people's ability to express themselves in politics was the epitome of Black cultural expression. To gain emancipation was to separate Black and White. The cultures could not combine as a way to avoid and protect the spirit of "the universal black."

== Contemporary interpretations ==
The concept of the "Talented Tenth" and the responsibilities assigned to it by Du Bois have been received both positively and negatively by contemporary critics.

Positively, some argue that current generations of college-educated African Americans abide by Du Bois's prescriptions by sacrificing their personal interests to lead and better their communities. This, in turn, leads to an "uplift" of those in the Black community. On the other hand, some argue that current generations of college educated African Americans should not abide by Du Bois's prescriptions, and should indeed pursue their own private interest. That is, they believe that college-educated African Americans are not responsible for bettering their communities, whereas Du Bois thinks that they are.

Advocates of Du Bois's prescriptions explain that key characteristics of the "Talented Tenth" have changed since Du Bois's time. One author writes, "The potential Talented Tenth of today is a 'me generation,' not the 'we generation' of the past." That is, the Talented Tenth of today focuses more on its own interests as opposed to the general interests of its racial community. Advocates of Du Bois's ideals believe that African Americans have lost sight of the importance of uplifting their communities. Rather, they have pursued their own interests and now dwell in the fruits of their "financial gain and strivings." Although the percentage of college-educated African Americans has gone up, it is still far lower than the percentage of college-educated White Americans. Therefore, these advocates believe that modern-day members of the "Talented Tenth" should still bear responsibility to use their education to help the African American community, which continues to suffer the effects of racial discrimination.

In contrast, those not in favor of Du Bois's prescriptions believe that individual African Americans have the right to pursue their own interests. Critics of Du Bois, and especially feminist critics, tend to believe that marginalized groups are often "put in boxes" and are expected to either remain within those constructs or abide by their stereotypes. These critics believe that what an African American decides to do with their college education should not become a stereotype. Furthermore, many of Du Bois's original texts, including The Talented Tenth, receive feminist criticism for exclusively using the word "man", implying that only African American men could seek out a college education. According to these feminists, this acts to perpetuate the persistence of a culture that only encourages or allows men to pursue higher education.

== See also ==
- African-American upper class – Contemporary successors of the Talented Tenth
- Class rank – Comparative measure of students' performance
- Meritocracy and Myth of meritocracy
- Natural aristocracy – similar concept developed by Thomas Jefferson, in a more broad context
- Negro Academy – scholarly institute that published many works of the Talented Tenth
