= The Future of the American Negro =

1899 book written by Booker T. Washington

The Future of the American Negro, a book written in 1899 by American educator Booker T. Washington, set forth his ideas regarding the history of enslaved and freed African-American people and their need for education to advance themselves. It was re-published as a second edition in 1900 and was made available in electronic form in 2008 via Project Gutenberg.

== Background ==
In the beginning of the book, the author mentions the term "industrial education". Washington describes this term as meaning, learning the necessities to become a valuable member of society as well and being able to apply this knowledge to industrial business. He believes that even though slavery is illegal, the freed African-Americans are still enslaved to the white people. Those who are freed cannot be members of society because they are not given the same opportunities.

As the book continues, Booker T. Washington writes that in order to understand the stress he applies to industrial education, the reader must "review the condition of affairs at the present time in the Southern States." He provides the information that the North and South are linked even though they were once at war. If the North cannot provide education then the South will not provide it.

Washington also states that the African-Americans are not superior, but that they are definitely not inferior to the white people. Slaves have had a hard time throughout their life in the United States. Their strength, knowledge, and perseverance has been tested by the white people that have run their lives for the longest time. Booker T. Washington asks, why should African-Americans have to prove themselves over and over when they have been proving themselves since they entered the country? The author also reminds them that, "An individual cannot succeed unless that individual has a great amount of faith himself."

African-Americans can have all the faith they want, but Washington argues that knowledge is needed to become useful members of society. Blacks have worked hard but will have to understand what they are working for.

Throughout the book, Washington refers to Tuskegee, a university founded by himself and others. It was a historically black university in Tuskegee, Alabama. In The Future of an American Negro, Booker writes that the university is, "placing men and women of intelligence, religion, modesty, conscience, and skill in every community in the South." Washington believes that Tuskegee University is providing the South with valuable members of society. In "Chapter V", there is a reference to a study showing that some 3,000 graduates or students are doing "commendable" work in the Southern community.

Near the end of the book, Washington describes the difference for freed slaves in the North and South. He reminds the reader that North has fewer employment options for black people which perpetuates the stress on the morals of an African-American. The South, however, having more opportunities for work and less stress on trying to do the right thing. He goes on to end the book with five principles that will aid African-Americans in their fight to have truly equal rights and opportunities. He states that these principle will be essential by saying, "So long as the Negro is permitted to get education, acquire property, and secure employment, and is treated with respect in the business or commercials world, … I shall have the greatest faith in his working out his own destiny in the Southern States."

== See also ==
- List of books written by Booker T. Washington
