= Working with the Hands =

1904 book by Booker T. Washington

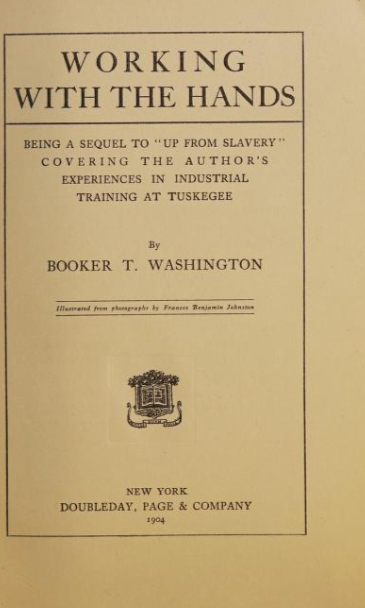
- Title page for Working with the Hands (1904)
- Author: Booker T. Washington
- Publication date: 1904
- Preceded by: Up From Slavery

Working with the Hands (1904) by Booker T. Washington is described by its author as a sequel to his classic Up From Slavery.

The full title of the work is Working with the hands; being a sequel to "Up From Slavery," covering the author's experiences in industrial training at Tuskegee.

== See also ==
- List of books written by Booker T. Washington

== Links ==
Archive.org scan of Working with the Hands
