= Tuskegee & Its People =

1905 book by Booker T. Washington

Tuskegee & Its People is a 1905 book edited by American educator Booker T Washington. Its full title is Tuskegee & Its People: Their Ideals and Achievements. It has been printed in various editions and is available for study online via Project Gutenberg.

The book was instrumental in promoting the cause of the Tuskegee Institute, and ensuring its continued support from Northern philanthropy. It discussed the types of vocational training available at the school and described the social benefits of educating Black Americans.

== See also ==
- List of books written by Booker T. Washington
