= The Negro in the South =

1907 book by W. E. B. Du Bois and Booker T. Washington

- Author: W. E. B. Du Bois; Booker T. Washington
- Language: English
- Genre: Non-fiction
- Publication date: 1907
- Publication place: United States

The Negro in the South is a book written in 1907 by sociologist W. E. B. Du Bois and educator Booker T. Washington that describes the social history of African-American people in the southern United States. It is a compilation of the William Levi Bull Lectures on Christian Sociology from that year. Washington and Du Bois had recently co-contributed to the Washington-edited 1903 collection The Negro Problem.

== Synopsis ==
The four chapters in The Negro in the South are split evenly between Du Bois and Washington, with Washington authoring the first two lectures and Du Bois authoring the latter two.

=== "The Economic Development of the Negro Race in Slavery" ===
Washington opens his first lecture discussing the institution of slavery, briefly touching upon his personal experience. He questions the difference in experiences between Native Americans and Black Americans, saying it came down to Native Americans "refus[ing] to submit" to the demands of White people. Through this comparison, he sets up his main point about the economic value of slave labor to the South's economy, where slaves worked as both skilled and common laborers, saying they could use those skills to their advantage. Washington also adds a bit to the end of his lecture regarding the relationship that Black Americans have with Christianity and how that helped them when creating a life after slavery.

=== "The Economic Development of the Negro Race Since its Emancipation" ===
Continuing where he left off on "the Economic Development of the Negro Race in Slavery," Washington states that he wishes to talk about the things that were to Black Americans' disadvantage when creating a life post-slavery. He analyzes the educational disparity between White and Black American children, bringing up his personal experiences at the Hampton Institute (now Hampton University) and the Tuskegee Institute. Specifically, he focuses on the motivations in what Black American parents wanted out of their children's education, saying there was a transition between valuing skills like farming or household work to more traditional education, which he refers to as "the book."

This lecture contains far more anecdotes than his previous one. Washington also briefly mentions the economic costs of teaching, using Gloucester County, Virginia, as an example for this part of the lecture.

=== "The Economic Revolution in the South" ===
In Du Bois' first lecture, he touches upon similar ideas to Washington's "The Economic Development of the Negro Race in Slavery" and "The Economic Development of the Negro Race Since its Emancipation," where Du Bois focuses on slavery as an economic driver of the South. He looks at the changes in the South after Reconstruction, where after dismantling the institution of slavery Southerners tried to keep the serfdom-like treatment of Black Americans even if slavery was no longer legal. He outlines four points regarding economy (house servant effort, effort in industry, economic elevation through landowning, and Group Economy) that have created the titular economic revolution. Finally, he talks about the migration of Black Americans to other areas.

=== "Religion in the South" ===
Du Bois discusses the ethics of slavery, looking at it through the context of Christianity. He states:

If, then, we are to study the history of religion in the South, we must first divest ourselves of prejudice, pro and con; we must try to put ourselves in the place of those who are seeking to read the riddle of life and grant to them about the same general charity and same general desire to do right that we find in the average human being. On the other hand, we must not, in striving to be charitable, be false to truth and right. Slavery in the United States was an economic mistake and a moral crime. This we cannot forget.

Once again, Du Bois brings up the concept of serfdom, this time going into detail about the parallels between serfdom and slavery in the South. He mentions that religion in the South originally reinforced slavery, where there was a recognized hierarchy in religious practices that were then paralleled in the practice of slavery. This notion was challenged, he says, as abolition sentiments grew stronger and the democratic Methodist and Baptist churches spread. Du Bois brings up various anecdotes shared to him by reverends and other Black Americans. He discusses the co-optation of religion by Black Americans, where Northern and Southern Black Americans worshipped in their own way.

== Topics ==
While the four essays all deal with slavery's impact on the South since its introduction, each focuses on a specific aspect, as evidenced in their titles. Both topics, economy and religion, are topics that the two men constantly spoke about during their time as activists.

=== Economy ===
A prominent part of Washington's ideology was that in order for Black people's situation to improve, they needed a good economic foundation where they needed to work diligently and gain property. His belief was that in focusing on improving their economic situation, or valuing the importance of what he called "green power," they would gain the rights many were fighting a losing battle for.

In 1940, Du Bois was writing about his early relationship with Washington, and when discussing Washington's economic beliefs said the following:

Mr. Washington, on the other hand, believed that the Negro as an efficient worker could gain wealth and that eventually through his ownership of capital he would be able to achieve a recognized place in American culture and then educate his children as he might wish and develop his possibilities. For this reason he proposed to put the emphasis at present upon training in the skilled trades and encouragement in industry and common labor.

Du Bois' beliefs regarding the intersection of race and economics have roots in Marxist ideology, where Du Bois over the course of his lifetime put Marx's concept of "economic determinism" into his beliefs. Marx's influence on Du Bois' interpretation of racism is further detailed in Du Bois' 1940 autobiography Dusk of Dawn, where he details his admiration for Marx and says that economy is a factor in determining "the basic pattern of culture."

In "The Economic Revolution in the South," Du Bois touches upon aspects of Antebellum Southern culture that reinforced the institution of slavery like paternalism through his discussion of serfdom paralleling the experiences of Black people. In his use of 'serfdom' to express his points, he wants to underline that Antebellum America, especially the South, profited off the labor of slaves, and that even after the Civil War and Reconstruction there will still be attempts to continue this system in the name of profit. This concept is succinctly stated as follows: "racism was deeply entrenched in a long surviving economic system in which blacks were portrayed as inferior with the functional motive of facilitating economic gain."

=== Religion ===
Seven years before "Religion in the South," Du Bois wrote the brief essay "The Religion of the American Negro," where he discussed the church's function as a haven in midst of oppression and segregation for Black people. He also used his idea of equating slavery to serfdom in other statements beyond "Religion in the South," saying Black people had been "'robbed'" of their labor during slavery and that post-Reconstruction they had been, "'set adrift penniless,'" possibly in reference to institutions to help dismantle slavery after the Civil War, like the Reconstruction Amendments and the Freedman's Bureau were not well protected by state and federal governments. He may have also been referring to the rise of sharecropping after the Civil War, which also made it difficult for former slaves to find independence of their former masters.

In Du Bois' personal life, he "retained a deep spiritual identification with the radical, messianic tradition of black faith," and was a lifelong critic of Western Christianity.

== See also ==
- List of books written by Booker T. Washington
- List of books written by W. E. B. Du Bois
