= Leota Plantation =

Forced-labor farm in Mississippi

Coordinates: 33.101915°N 91.115536°W

- Interactive map of the Leota Plantation area

General information
- Status: destroyed by flooding
- Client: Isaac Worthington

The Leota Plantation was a historic large forced-labor farm on the banks of the Mississippi River in Washington County, Mississippi. It was established in 1825 and destroyed by a flood in 1930.

== History ==
The plantation was established in 1825 by Isaac Worthington, a Kentucky-born veteran of the War of 1812. He named it after his daughter Annie's favorite fictional character in 1829. Worthington lived here with his wife, Ann Taylor, their children (including future sheriff Thomas Worthington), and the Black people he enslaved.

By 1858, Worthington built a mansion to serve as main residence and headquarters of the forced-labor farm, which also acted as a town, partly due to its location on the shipping route between Memphis, Tennessee, and Vicksburg, Mississippi. He also built "twelve stores, a post office", a school, and a church of the Methodist Episcopal Church, South. The mansion was destroyed in a flood in 1883. In 1930, the entire plantation was taken over by another flood. An old cemetery is still visible.

An island on the Mississippi River called Worthington Island was named after the former plantation.
