= Booker T. Washington =

American educator, author, orator and adviser (1856–1915)

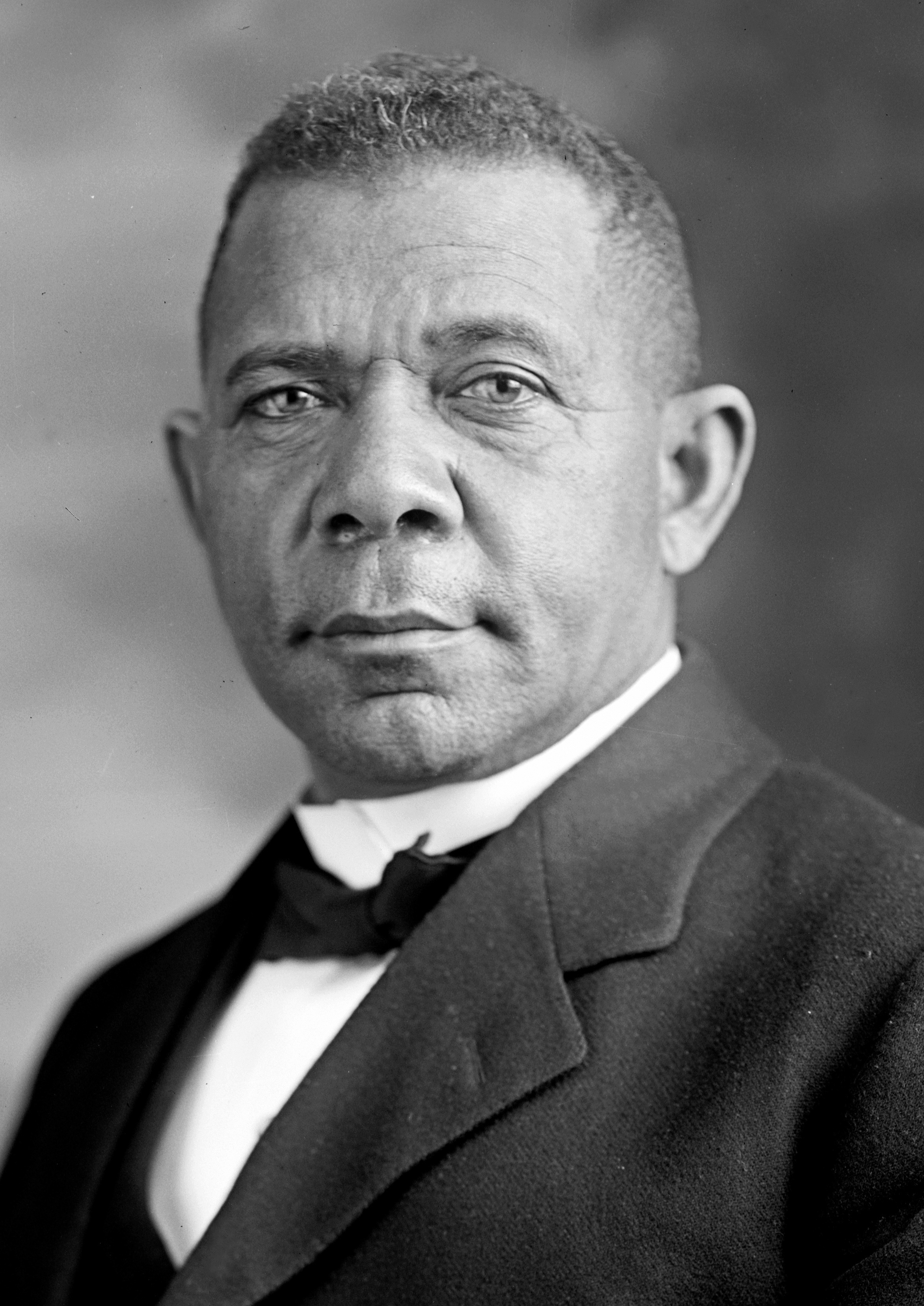
- Washington in 1905
- Born: Booker Taliaferro Washington; April 5, 1856; Hale's Ford, Virginia, U.S.
- Died: November 14, 1915 (aged 59); Tuskegee, Alabama, U.S.
- Resting place: Tuskegee University
- Education: Hampton Normal and Agricultural Institute; Wayland Seminary
- Occupations: Educator; author; African-American civil rights leader
- Political party: Republican
- Spouses: Fannie N. Smith (m. 1882; died 1884); Olivia A. Davidson (m. 1886; died 1889); Margaret Murray (m. 1893)
- Children: Portia M. Washington Pittman; Ernest Davidson Washington; Booker T. Washington, Jr.
- Booker T. Washington's voice Opening of the "Atlanta Exposition Speech"; Recorded 1908

Booker Taliaferro Washington (April 5, 1856 – November 14, 1915) was an American educator, author, and orator. Between 1890 and 1915, Washington was the primary leader in the African-American community and of the contemporary Black elite.

Born into slavery on April 5, 1856, in Hale's Ford, Virginia, Washington was freed when U.S. troops reached the area during the Civil War. As a young man, he worked his way through Hampton Normal and Agricultural Institute and attended college at Wayland Seminary. In 1881, he was named as the first leader of the new Tuskegee Institute in Alabama, an institute for black higher education. He expanded the college, enlisting students in construction of buildings. Work at the college was considered fundamental to students' larger education. He attained national prominence for his Atlanta Address of 1895, which attracted the attention of politicians and the public. Washington played a dominant role in black politics, winning wide support in the black community of the South and among more liberal whites. Washington wrote an autobiography, Up from Slavery, in 1901, which became a major text. In that year, he dined with Theodore Roosevelt at the White House. After an illness, he died in Tuskegee, Alabama, on November 14, 1915.

Washington was a key proponent of African-American businesses and one of the founders of the National Negro Business League. Washington mobilized a nationwide coalition of middle-class Black people, church leaders, and white philanthropists and politicians, with the goal of building the community's economic strength and pride by focusing on self-help and education. Washington had the ear of the powerful in the United States of his day, including presidents. He used the nineteenth-century American political system to manipulate the media, raise money, develop strategy, network, distribute funds, and reward a cadre of supporters. Because of his influential leadership, the timespan of his activity, from 1880 to 1915, has been called the Age of Booker T. Washington. Washington called for Black progress through education and entrepreneurship, rather than trying to challenge directly the Jim Crow segregation and the disenfranchisement of Black voters in the South. Furthermore, he supported racial uplift, but secretly also supported court challenges to segregation and to restrictions on voter registration. Black activists in the North, led by W. E. B. Du Bois, disagreed with him and opted to set up the NAACP to work for political change.

After his death in 1915, he came under heavy criticism for accommodating white supremacy, despite his claims that his long-term goal was to end the disenfranchisement of African Americans, the vast majority of whom still lived in the South. Decades after Washington's death in 1915, the civil rights movement of the 1950s took a more active and progressive approach, which was also based on new grassroots organizations based in the South. Washington's legacy has been controversial in the civil rights community.

== Early life ==
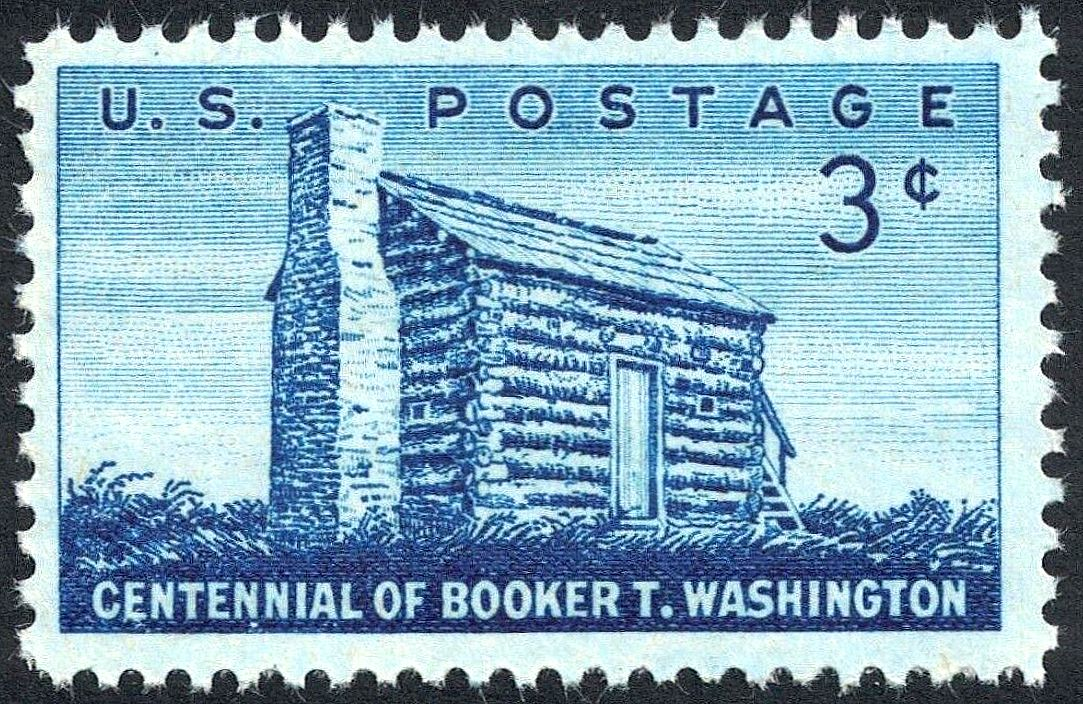
On the 100th anniversary of his birth, April 5, 1956, the US Post office issued a commemorative stamp depicting the birthplace of Booker T. Washington in Franklin County, Virginia.

Booker was born into slavery to Jane, an enslaved African-American woman on the plantation of James Burroughs in southwest Virginia, near Hale's Ford in Franklin County. He never knew the day, month, and year of his birth (although evidence emerged after his death that he was born on April 5, 1856). (Note: Louis R. Harlan writes, "BTW gave his age as nineteen in September 1874, which would suggest his birth in 1855 or late 1854.... As an adult, however, BTW believed he was born in 1857 or 1858. He celebrated his birthday on Easter, either because he had been told he was born in the spring, or simply in order to keep holidays to a minimum. After BTW's death, John H. Washington reported seeing BTW's birth date, April 5, 1856, in a Burroughs family bible. On this testimony, the Tuskegee trustees formally adopted that day as 'the exact date of his birth.' The trustees were understandably anxious to establish a time for celebrating the Founder's birthday, however, and apparently no one has seen this Bible since.") Nor did he ever know his father, said to be a white man who resided on a neighboring plantation. The man played no financial or emotional role in Washington's life.

From his earliest years, Washington was known simply as "Booker", with no middle or surname, in the practice of the time. His mother, her relatives and his siblings struggled with the demands of slavery. He later wrote:

I cannot remember a single instance during my childhood or early boyhood when our entire family sat down to the table together, and God's blessing was asked, and the family ate a meal in a civilized manner. On the plantation in Virginia, and even later, meals were gotten to the children very much as dumb animals get theirs. It was a piece of bread here and a scrap of meat there. It was a cup of milk at one time and some potatoes at another.

When he was nine, Booker and his family in Virginia gained freedom under the Emancipation Proclamation as U.S. troops occupied their region. Booker was thrilled by the formal day of their emancipation in early 1865:

As the great day drew nearer, there was more singing in the slave quarters than usual. It was bolder, had more ring, and lasted later into the night. Most of the verses of the plantation songs had some reference to freedom.... [S]ome man who seemed to be a stranger (a United States officer, I presume) made a little speech and then read a rather long paper—the Emancipation Proclamation, I think. After the reading we were told that we were all free, and could go when and where we pleased. My mother, who was standing by my side, leaned over and kissed her children, while tears of joy ran down her cheeks. She explained to us what it all meant, that this was the day for which she had been so long praying, but fearing that she would never live to see.

After emancipation Jane took her family to the free state of West Virginia to join her husband, Washington Ferguson, who had escaped from slavery during the war and settled there. Previously barred by law from being educated, Booker painstakingly began to teach himself to read, and attended school for the first time.

At school, Booker was asked for a surname for registration. He chose the family name of Washington. Still later he learned from his mother that she had originally given him the name "Booker Taliaferro" at the time of his birth, but his second name was not used by the master. Upon learning of his original name, Washington immediately readopted it as his own, and became known as Booker Taliaferro Washington for the rest of his life.

Booker loved books:

The Negro worshipped books. We wanted books, more books. The larger the books were the better we like[d] them. We thought the mere possession and the mere handling and the mere worship of books was going, in some inexplicable way, to make great and strong and useful men of our race.

== Higher education ==
Washington worked in salt furnaces and coal mines in West Virginia for several years to earn money. At age 16, he made his way east—mostly on foot—to Hampton Institute, a school established in Virginia to educate freedmen and their descendants, where he also worked as a janitor to pay for his studies. Washington arrived to campus with very little money; and his entrance exam was to clean a room. Upon graduating from Hampton at age 19, Washington briefly returned home to West Virginia. He later attended Wayland Seminary in Washington, D.C. in 1878.

== Tuskegee Institute ==
In 1881, the Hampton Institute president Samuel C. Armstrong recommended Washington, then aged 25, to become the first leader of Tuskegee Normal and Industrial Institute (later Tuskegee Institute, now Tuskegee University), the new normal school (teachers' college) in Alabama. The new school opened on July 4, 1881, initially using a room donated by Butler Chapel A.M.E. Zion Church.

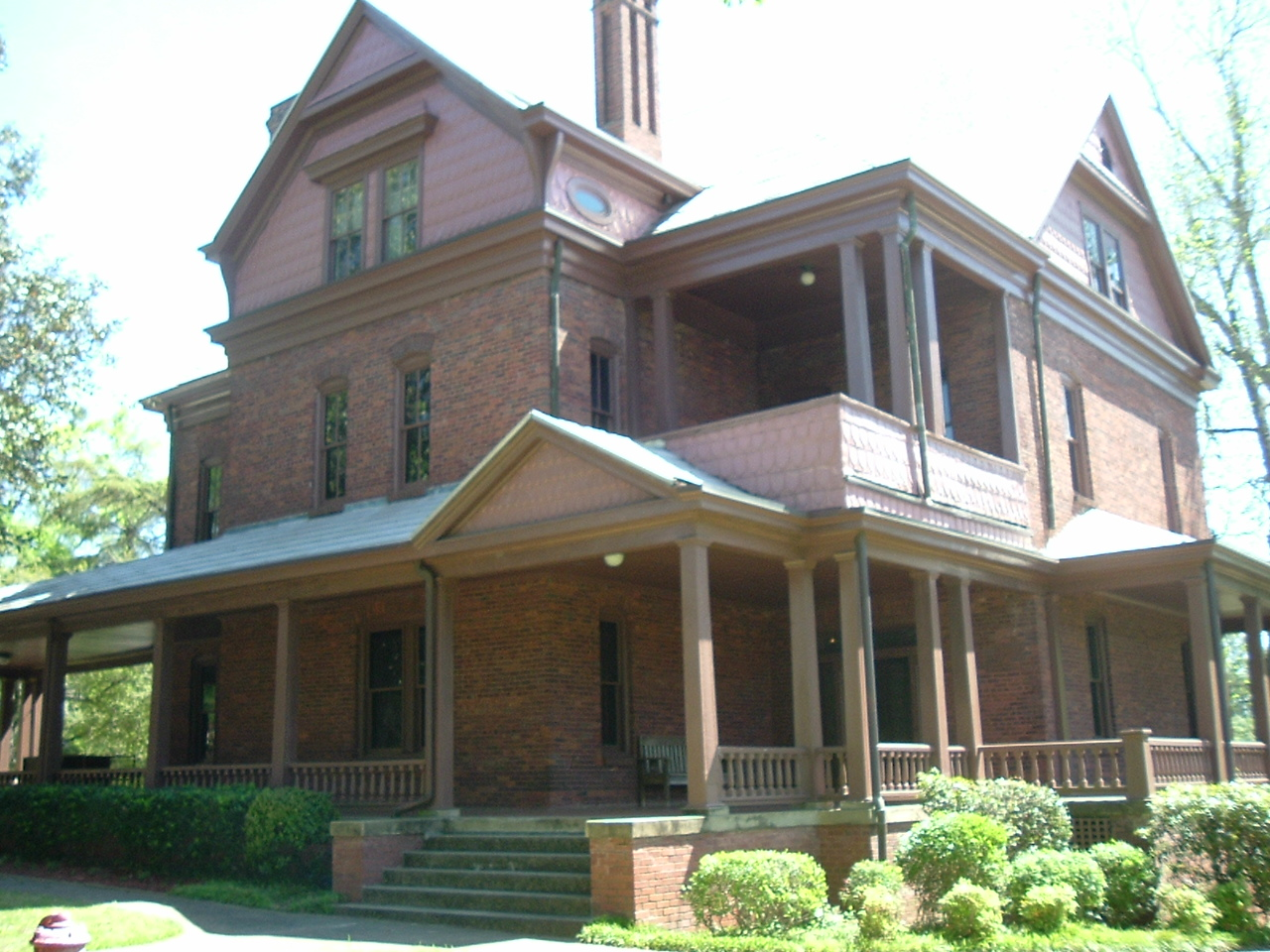
The Oaks – Booker T. Washington's house at Tuskegee University

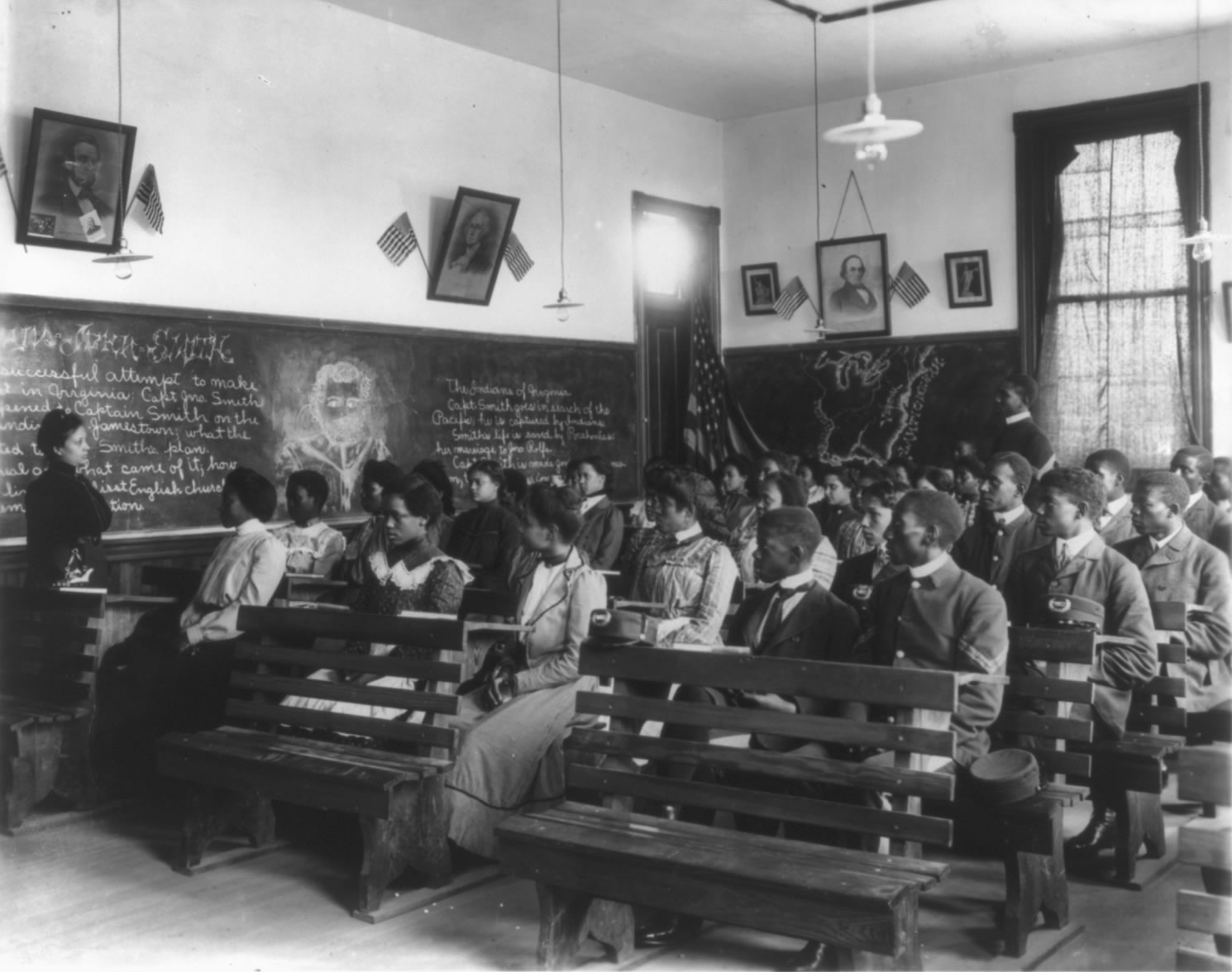
A history class conducted at the Tuskegee Institute in 1902

The next year, Washington purchased a former plantation to be developed as the permanent site of the campus. Under his direction, his students literally built their own school: making bricks, constructing classrooms, barns and outbuildings; and growing their own crops and raising livestock; both for learning and to provide for most of the basic necessities. Both men and women had to learn trades as well as academics. The Tuskegee faculty used all the activities to teach the students basic skills to take back to their mostly rural black communities throughout the South. The main goal was not to produce farmers and tradesmen, but teachers of farming and trades who could teach in the new lower schools and colleges for Black people across the South. The school expanded over the decades, adding programs and departments, to become the present-day Tuskegee University.

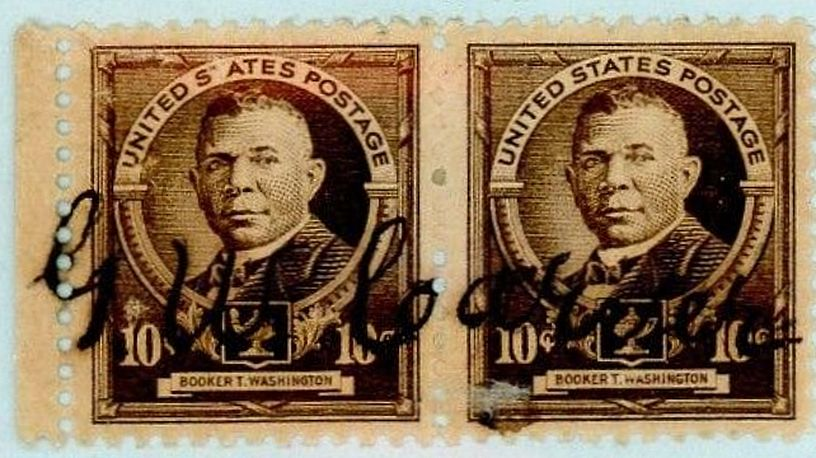
B.T. Washington stamps autographed by Carver

The Oaks, "a large comfortable home", was built on campus for Washington and his family. They moved into the house in 1900. Washington lived there until his death in 1915. His widow, Margaret, lived at The Oaks until her death in 1925.

In 1896 when Washington reviewed the study conducted by George Washington Carver about the infection plaguing the soybean crop he invited Carver to head the Agriculture Department at Tuskegee, where they became close friends. Carver later autographed commemorative stamps issued in 1940 in Washington's honor.

== Tuskegee Machine ==
Washington led Tuskegee for more than 30 years after becoming its leader. As he developed it, adding to both the curriculum and the facilities on the campus, he became a prominent national leader among African Americans, with considerable influence with wealthy white philanthropists and politicians. The political network that Washington formed, headquartered at the Tuskegee Institute, was called the "Tuskegee Machine".

Washington expressed his vision for his race through the school. He believed that by providing needed skills to society, African Americans would play their part, leading to acceptance by white Americans. He believed that Black people would eventually gain full participation in society by acting as responsible, reliable American citizens. Shortly after the Spanish–American War, President William McKinley and most of his cabinet visited Booker Washington. By his death in 1915, Tuskegee had grown to encompass more than 100 well-equipped buildings, roughly 1,500 students, 200 faculty members teaching 38 trades and professions, and an endowment of approximately $2 million (~$46 million in 2025).

Washington helped develop other schools and colleges. In 1891, he lobbied the West Virginia legislature to locate the newly authorized West Virginia Colored Institute (today West Virginia State University) in the Kanawha Valley of West Virginia near Charleston. He visited the campus often and spoke at its first commencement exercise.

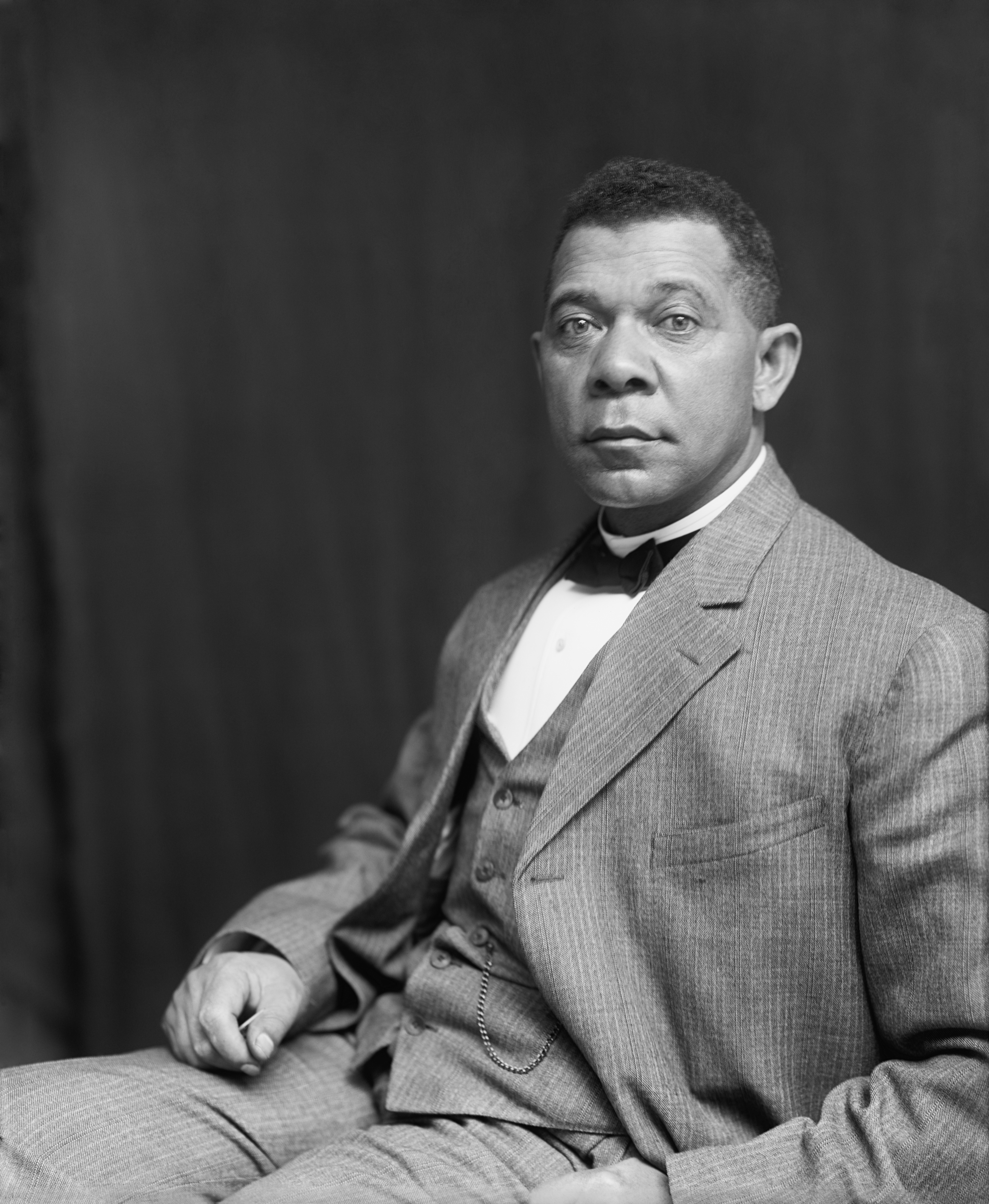
Washington c. 1895, by Frances Benjamin Johnston

Washington was a dominant figure of the African-American community, then still overwhelmingly based in the South, from 1890 to his death in 1915. His Atlanta Address of 1895 received national attention. He was a popular spokesman for African-American citizens. Representing the last generation of black leaders born into slavery, Washington was generally perceived as a supporter of education for freedmen and their descendants in the post-Reconstruction, Jim Crow-era South. He stressed basic education and training in the skills of the tradesperson and domestic because he thought these represented the work abilities most needed in what was still a rural economy.

Throughout the final twenty years of his life, he maintained his standing through a nationwide network of supporters including black educators, ministers, editors, and businessmen, especially those who supported his views on social and educational issues for Black people. He also gained access to top national white leaders in politics, philanthropy and education, raised large sums, was consulted on race issues, and was awarded honorary degrees from Harvard University in 1896 and Dartmouth College in 1901.

Late in his career, Washington was criticized by civil rights leader and NAACP founder W. E. B. Du Bois. Du Bois and his supporters opposed the Atlanta Address as the "Atlanta Compromise", because it suggested that African Americans should work for, and submit to, white political rule. Du Bois insisted on full civil rights, due process of law, and increased political representation for African Americans which, he believed, could only be achieved through activism and higher education for African Americans. He believed that "the talented tenth" would lead the race. Du Bois labeled Washington, "the Great Accommodator". Washington responded that confrontation could lead to disaster for the outnumbered Black people, and that cooperation with supportive whites was the only way to overcome racism in the long run.

While promoting moderation, Washington contributed secretly and substantially to mounting legal challenges activist African Americans launched against segregation and disenfranchisement of Black people. In his public role, he believed he could achieve more by skillful accommodation to the social realities of the age of segregation.

Washington's work on education helped him enlist both the moral and substantial financial support of many major white philanthropists. He became a friend of such self-made men as Standard Oil magnate Henry Huttleston Rogers; Sears, Roebuck and Company President Julius Rosenwald; and George Eastman, inventor of roll film, founder of Eastman Kodak, and developer of a major part of the photography industry. These individuals and many other wealthy men and women funded his causes, including Hampton and Tuskegee institutes.

He also gave lectures to raise money for the school. On January 23, 1906, he lectured at Carnegie Hall in New York in the Tuskegee Institute Silver Anniversary Lecture. He spoke along with prominent orators of the day, including Mark Twain, Joseph Hodges Choate, and Robert Curtis Ogden; it was the start of a capital campaign to raise $1,800,000 (~$48.3 million in 2025) for the school.

The schools which Washington supported were founded primarily to produce teachers, as education was critical for the black community following emancipation. Freedmen strongly supported literacy and education as the keys to their future. When graduates returned to their largely impoverished rural southern communities, they still found few schools and educational resources, as the white-dominated state legislatures consistently underfunded black schools in their segregated system.

To address those needs, in the 20th century, Washington enlisted his philanthropic network to create matching funds programs to stimulate construction of numerous rural public schools for black children in the South. Working especially with Julius Rosenwald from Chicago, Washington had Tuskegee architects develop model school designs. The Rosenwald Fund helped support the construction and operation of more than 5,000 schools and related resources for the education of Black people throughout the South in the late nineteenth and early twentieth centuries. The local schools were a source of communal pride; African-American families gave labor, land and money to them, to give their children more chances in an environment of poverty and segregation. A major part of Washington's legacy, the model rural schools continued to be constructed into the 1930s, with matching funds for communities from the Rosenwald Fund.

Washington further contributed to the Progressive Era by forming the National Negro Business League, an organization which encouraged and supported entrepreneurship among black businessmen.

His autobiography Up from Slavery has been continuously widely read since its initial publication in 1901.

== Marriages and children ==
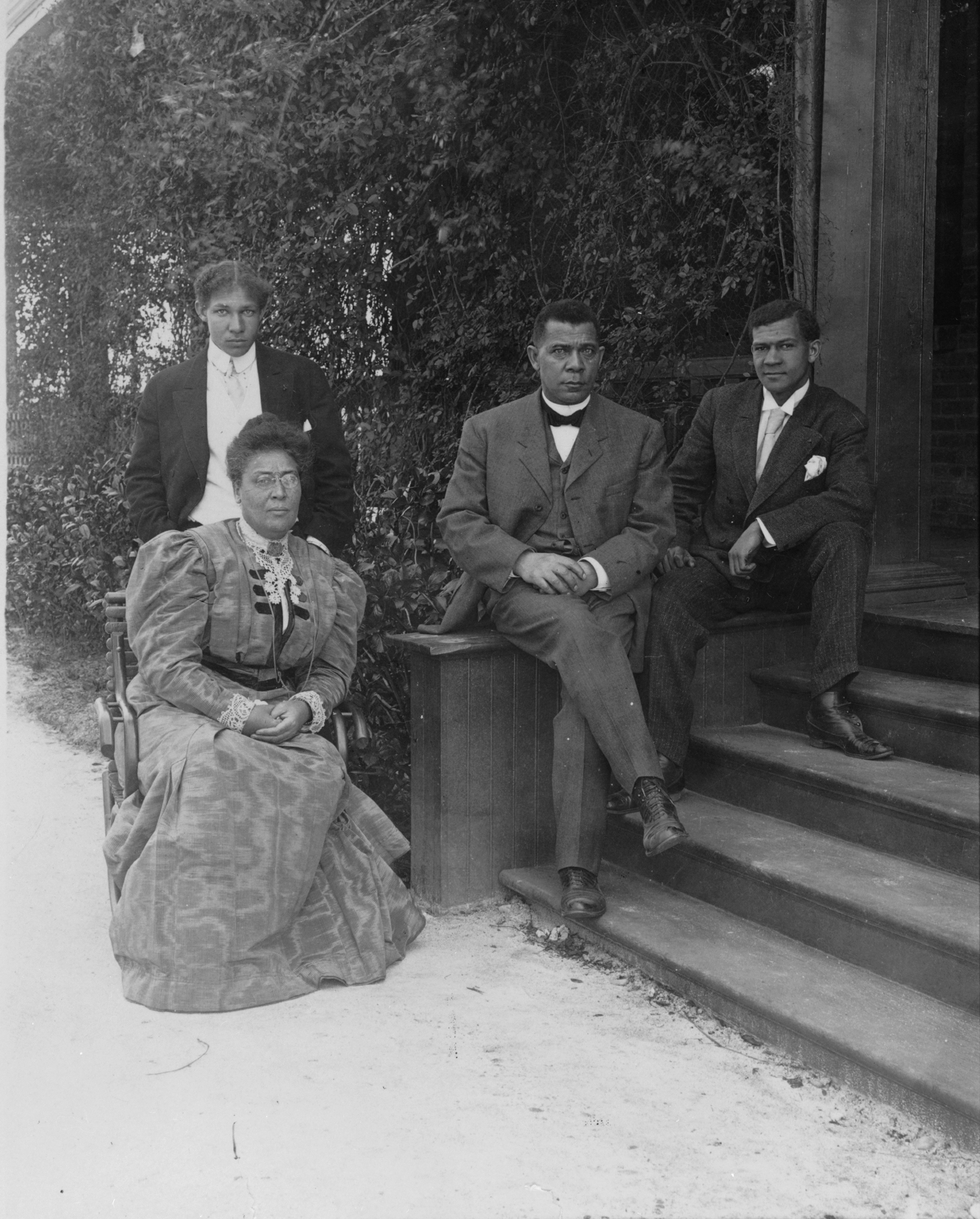
Booker T. Washington with his third wife Margaret and two sons, Ernest, left and Booker T. Jr., right

Washington was married three times. In his autobiography Up from Slavery, he gave all three of his wives credit for their contributions at Tuskegee. His first wife Fannie N. Smith was from Malden, West Virginia, the same Kanawha River Valley town where Washington had lived from age nine to sixteen. He maintained ties there all his life, and Smith was a student of his when he taught in Malden. He helped her gain entrance into the Hampton Institute. Washington and Smith were married in the summer of 1882, a year after he became principal there. They had one child, Portia M. Washington, born in 1883. Fannie died in May 1884.

In 1885, the widower Washington married again, to Olivia A. Davidson (1854–1889). Born free in Virginia to a free woman of color and a father who had been freed from slavery, she moved with her family to the free state of Ohio, where she attended common schools. Davidson later studied at Hampton Institute and went North to study at the Massachusetts State Normal School at Framingham. She taught in Mississippi and Tennessee before going to Tuskegee to work as a teacher. Washington recruited Davidson to Tuskegee, and promoted her to vice-principal. They had two sons, Booker T. Washington Jr. and Ernest Davidson Washington, before she died in 1889.

In 1893, Washington married Margaret James Murray. She was from Mississippi and had graduated from Fisk University, a historically black college. They had no children together, but she helped rear Washington's three children. Murray outlived Washington and died in 1925.

== Politics and the Atlanta Compromise ==
"The Atlanta Compromise"
The opening of Booker T. Washington's "Atlanta Compromise" speech to the Atlanta Cotton States and International Exposition, recorded in 1908

Washington's 1895 Atlanta Exhibition address was viewed as a "revolutionary moment" by both African Americans and whites across the country. At the time, W. E. B. Du Bois supported him, but they grew apart as Du Bois sought more action to remedy disfranchisement and improve educational opportunities for Black people. After their falling out, Du Bois and his supporters referred to Washington's speech as the "Atlanta Compromise" to express their criticism that Washington was too accommodating to white interests.

Washington advocated a "go slow" approach to avoid a harsh white backlash. He has been criticized for encouraging many youths in the South to accept sacrifices of potential political power, civil rights, and higher education. Washington believed that African Americans should "concentrate all their energies on industrial education, and accumulation of wealth, and the conciliation of the South". He valued the "industrial" education, as it provided critical skills for the jobs then available to the majority of African Americans at the time, as most lived in the South, which was overwhelmingly rural and agricultural. He thought these skills would lay the foundation for the creation of stability that the African-American community required in order to move forward. He believed that in the long term, "Black people would eventually gain full participation in society by showing themselves to be responsible, reliable American citizens". His approach advocated for an initial step toward equal rights, rather than full equality under the law, gaining economic power to back up black demands for political equality in the future. He believed that such achievements would prove to the deeply prejudiced white America that African Americans were not "'naturally' stupid and incompetent".

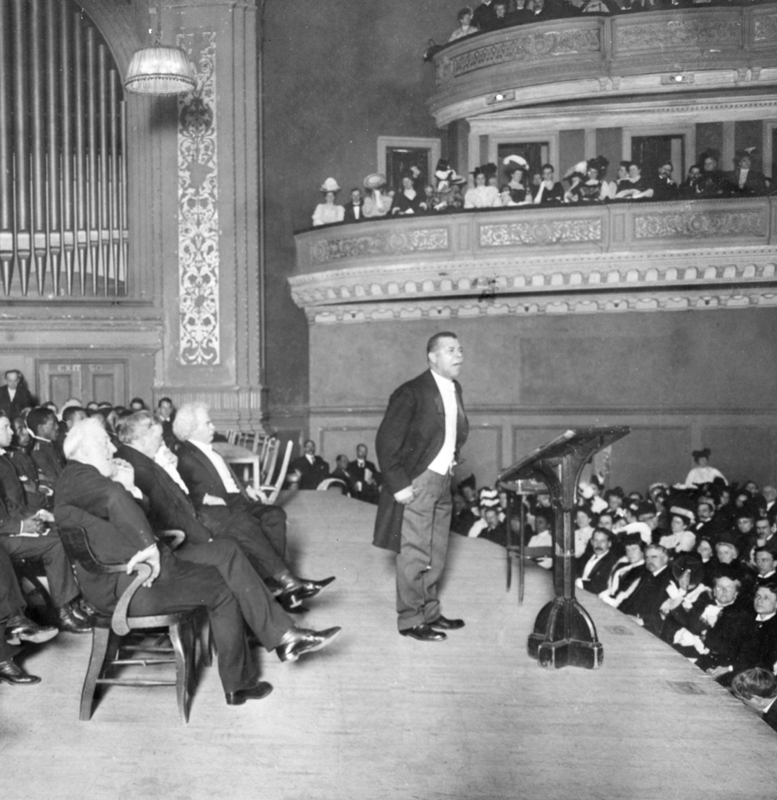
Washington giving a speech at Carnegie Hall in New York City, 1909

Well-educated Black people in the North lived in a different society and advocated a different approach, in part due to their perception of wider opportunities. Du Bois wanted Black people to have the same "classical" liberal arts education as upper-class whites did, along with voting rights and civic equality. The latter two had been ostensibly granted since 1870 by constitutional amendments after the Civil War. He believed that an elite, which he called the talented tenth, would advance to lead the race to a wider variety of occupations. Du Bois and Washington were divided in part by differences in treatment of African Americans in the North versus the South; although both groups suffered discrimination, the mass of Black people in the South were far more constrained by legal segregation and disenfranchisement, which totally excluded most from the political process and system. Many in the North objected to being "led", and authoritatively spoken for, by a Southern accommodationist strategy which they considered to have been "imposed on them [Southern Black people] primarily by Southern whites".

Historian Clarence E. Walker wrote that, for white Southerners:

Free black people were 'matter out of place'. Their emancipation was an affront to southern white freedom. Booker T. Washington did not understand that his program was perceived as subversive of a natural order in which black people were to remain forever subordinate or unfree.

Both Washington and Du Bois sought to define the best means post-Civil War to improve the conditions of the African-American community through education.

Washington worked and socialized with many national white politicians and industry leaders. He developed the ability to persuade wealthy whites, many of them self-made men, to donate money to black causes by appealing to their values. He argued that the surest way for Black people to gain equal social rights was to demonstrate "industry, thrift, intelligence and property". He believed these were key to improved conditions for African Americans in the United States. Because African Americans had recently been emancipated and most lived in a hostile environment, Washington believed they could not expect too much at once. He said, "I have learned that success is to be measured not so much by the position that one has reached in life as by the obstacles which he has had to overcome while trying to succeed."

Along with Du Bois, Washington partly organized the "Negro exhibition" at the 1900 Exposition Universelle in Paris, where photos of Hampton Institute's black students were displayed. These were taken by his friend Frances Benjamin Johnston. The exhibition demonstrated African Americans' positive contributions to United States society.

Washington privately contributed substantial funds for legal challenges to segregation and disfranchisement, such as the case of Giles v. Harris, which was heard before the United States Supreme Court in 1903. Even when such challenges were won at the Supreme Court, southern states quickly responded with new laws to accomplish the same ends, for instance, adding "grandfather clauses" that covered white people and not black people in order to prevent black people from voting.

== Wealthy friends and benefactors ==
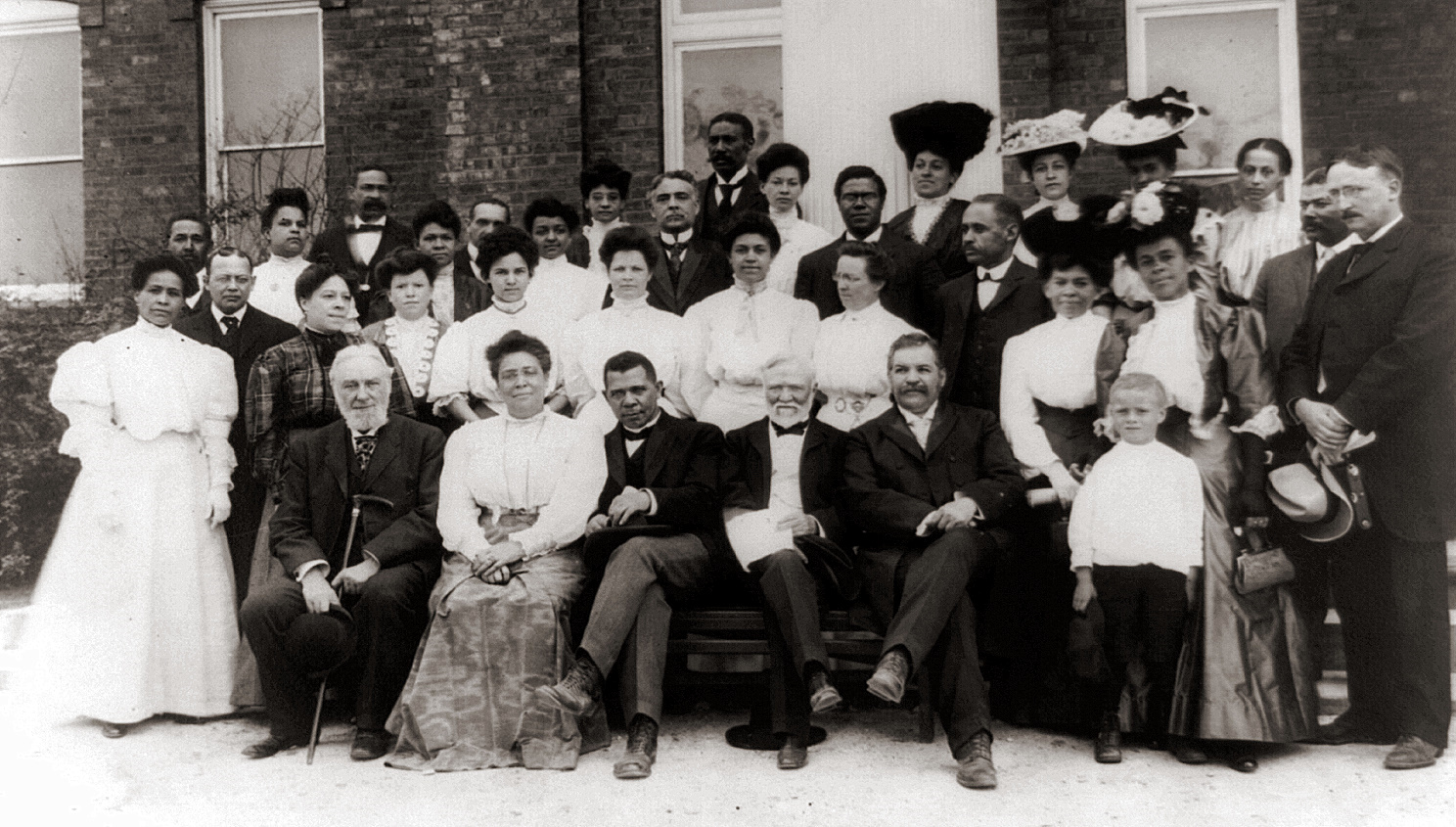
Andrew Carnegie and Robert Curtis Ogden with the faculty of the Tuskegee Institute in 1906

State and local governments historically underfunded black schools, although they were ostensibly providing "separate but equal" segregated facilities. White philanthropists strongly supported education financially. Washington encouraged them and directed millions of their money to projects all across the South that Washington thought best reflected his self-help philosophy. Washington associated with the richest and most powerful businessmen and politicians of the era, as well as many other educational leaders, such as William Rainey Harper, president of the University of Chicago. He was seen as a spokesperson for African Americans and became a conduit for funding educational programs.

His contacts included such diverse and well known entrepreneurs and philanthropists as Andrew Carnegie, William Howard Taft, John D. Rockefeller, Henry Huttleston Rogers, George Eastman, Julius Rosenwald, Robert Curtis Ogden, Collis Potter Huntington and William Henry Baldwin Jr. The latter donated large sums of money to agencies such as the Jeanes and Slater Funds. As a result, countless small rural schools were established through Washington's efforts, under programs that continued many years after his death. Along with rich white men, the black communities helped their communities directly by donating time, money and labor to schools to match the funds required.

=== Henry Huttleston Rogers ===
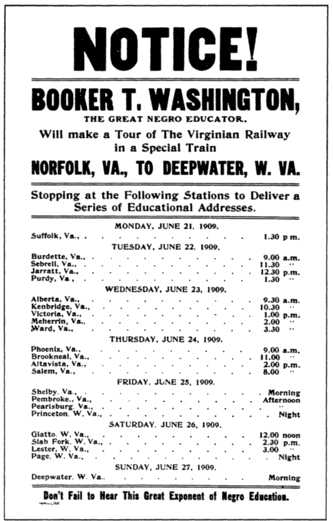
Handbill during his 1909 tour of southern Virginia and West Virginia

A representative case of an exceptional relationship was Washington's friendship with millionaire industrialist and financier Henry H. Rogers (1840–1909). Henry Rogers was a self-made man, who had risen from a modest working-class family to become a principal officer of Standard Oil, and one of the richest men in the United States. Around 1894, Rogers heard Washington speak at Madison Square Garden. The next day, he contacted Washington and requested a meeting, during which Washington later recounted that he was told that Rogers "was surprised that no one had 'passed the hat' after the speech". The meeting began a close relationship that extended over a period of 15 years. Although Washington and the very private Rogers were seen as friends, the true depth and scope of their relationship was not publicly revealed until after Rogers's sudden death from a stroke in May 1909. Washington was a frequent guest at Rogers's New York office, his Fairhaven, Massachusetts summer home, and aboard his steam yacht Kanawha.

A few weeks later, Washington went on a previously planned speaking tour along the newly completed Virginian Railway, a $40-million enterprise that had been built almost entirely from Rogers's personal fortune. As Washington rode in the late financier's private railroad car, Dixie, he stopped and made speeches at many locations. His companions later recounted that he had been warmly welcomed by both black and white citizens at each stop.

Washington revealed that Rogers had been quietly funding operations of 65 small country schools for African Americans, and had given substantial sums of money to support Tuskegee and Hampton institutes. He also noted that Rogers had encouraged programs with matching funds requirements so the recipients had a stake in the outcome.

=== Anna T. Jeanes ===
In 1907, Philadelphia Quaker Anna T. Jeanes (1822–1907) donated one million dollars to Washington for elementary schools for black children in the South. Her contributions and those of Henry Rogers and others funded schools in many poor communities.

=== Julius Rosenwald ===
Julius Rosenwald (1862–1932) was a Jewish American self-made wealthy man with whom Washington found common ground. By 1908, Rosenwald, son of an immigrant clothier, had become part-owner and president of Sears, Roebuck and Company in Chicago. Rosenwald was a philanthropist who was deeply concerned about the poor state of African-American education, especially in the segregated Southern states, where their schools were underfunded.

In 1912, Rosenwald was asked to serve on the Board of Directors of Tuskegee Institute, a position he held for the remainder of his life. Rosenwald endowed Tuskegee so that Washington could spend less time fundraising and more managing the school. Later in 1912, Rosenwald provided funds to Tuskegee for a pilot program to build six new small schools in rural Alabama. They were designed, constructed and opened in 1913 and 1914, and overseen by Tuskegee architects and staff; the model proved successful.

After Washington died in 1915, Rosenwald established the Rosenwald Fund in 1917, primarily to serve African-American students in rural areas throughout the South. The school building program was one of the fund's largest programs. Using the architectural model plans developed by professors at Tuskegee Institute, the Rosenwald Fund spent more than $4 million to help build 4,977 schools, 217 teachers' homes, and 163 shop buildings in 883 counties in 15 states, from Maryland to Texas. The Rosenwald Fund made matching grants, requiring community support, cooperation from the white school boards, and local fundraising. Black communities raised more than $4.7 million to aid the construction and sometimes donated land and labor; essentially they taxed themselves twice to do so. These schools became informally known as Rosenwald Schools. But the philanthropist did not want them to be named for him, as they belonged to their communities. By the time of his death in 1932, these newer facilities could accommodate one-third of all African-American children in Southern U.S. schools.

== Up from Slavery to the White House ==
Washington's long-term adviser, Timothy Thomas Fortune (1856–1928), was a respected African-American economist and editor of The New York Age, the most widely read newspaper in the black community within the United States. He was the ghost-writer and editor of Washington's first autobiography, The Story of My Life and Work. Washington published five books during his lifetime with the aid of ghost-writers Timothy Fortune, Max Bennett Thrasher and Robert E. Park.

They included compilations of speeches and essays:

- The Story of My Life and Work (1900)
- Up from Slavery (1901)
- The Story of the Negro: The Rise of the Race from Slavery (2 vols, 1909)
- My Larger Education (1911)
- The Man Farthest Down (1912)

In an effort to inspire the "commercial, agricultural, educational, and industrial advancement" of African Americans, Washington founded the National Negro Business League (NNBL) in 1900.

When Washington's second autobiography, Up from Slavery, was published in 1901, it became a bestseller—remaining the best-selling autobiography of an African American for more than sixty years—and had a major effect on the African-American community and its friends and allies.

=== Dinner at the White House ===
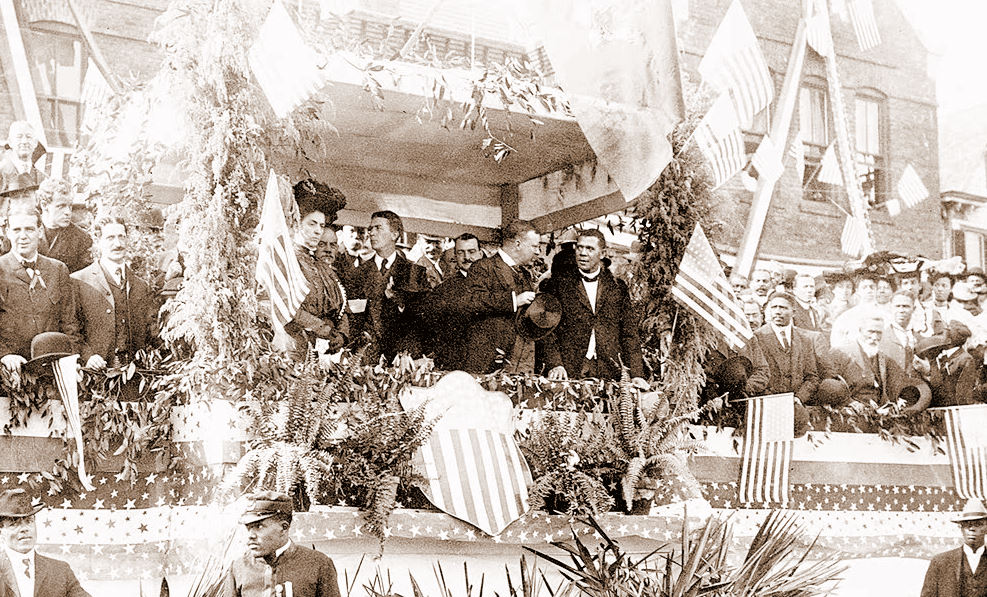
Booker Washington and Theodore Roosevelt at the Tuskegee Institute, 1905

In October 1901, President Theodore Roosevelt invited Washington to dine with him and his family at the White House. Although Republican presidents had met privately with black leaders, this was the first highly publicized social occasion when an African American was invited there on equal terms by the president. Democratic Party politicians from the South, including future governor of Mississippi James K. Vardaman and Senator Benjamin Tillman of South Carolina, indulged in racist personal attacks when they learned of the invitation. Both used the derogatory term for African Americans in their statements. The meeting was also condemned by the Democratic perennial presidential candidate William Jennings Bryan, who argued that "the more advanced race never has consented, and probably never will consent, to be dominated by the less advanced" despite him having previously praised Washington.

Vardaman described the White House as "so saturated with the odor of the nigger that the rats have taken refuge in the stable", and declared, "I am just as much opposed to Booker T. Washington as a voter as I am to the cocoanut-headed, chocolate-colored typical little coon who blacks my shoes every morning. Neither is fit to perform the supreme function of citizenship." Tillman said, "The action of President Roosevelt in entertaining that nigger will necessitate our killing a thousand niggers in the South before they will learn their place again."

Ladislaus Hengelmüller von Hengervár, the Austro-Hungarian ambassador to the United States, who was visiting the White House on the same day, said he found a rabbit's foot in Washington's coat pocket when he mistakenly put on the coat. The Washington Post described it as "the left hind foot of a graveyard rabbit, killed in the dark of the moon". The Detroit Journal quipped the next day, "The Austrian ambassador may have made off with Booker T. Washington's coat at the White House, but he'd have a bad time trying to fill his shoes."

== Death ==
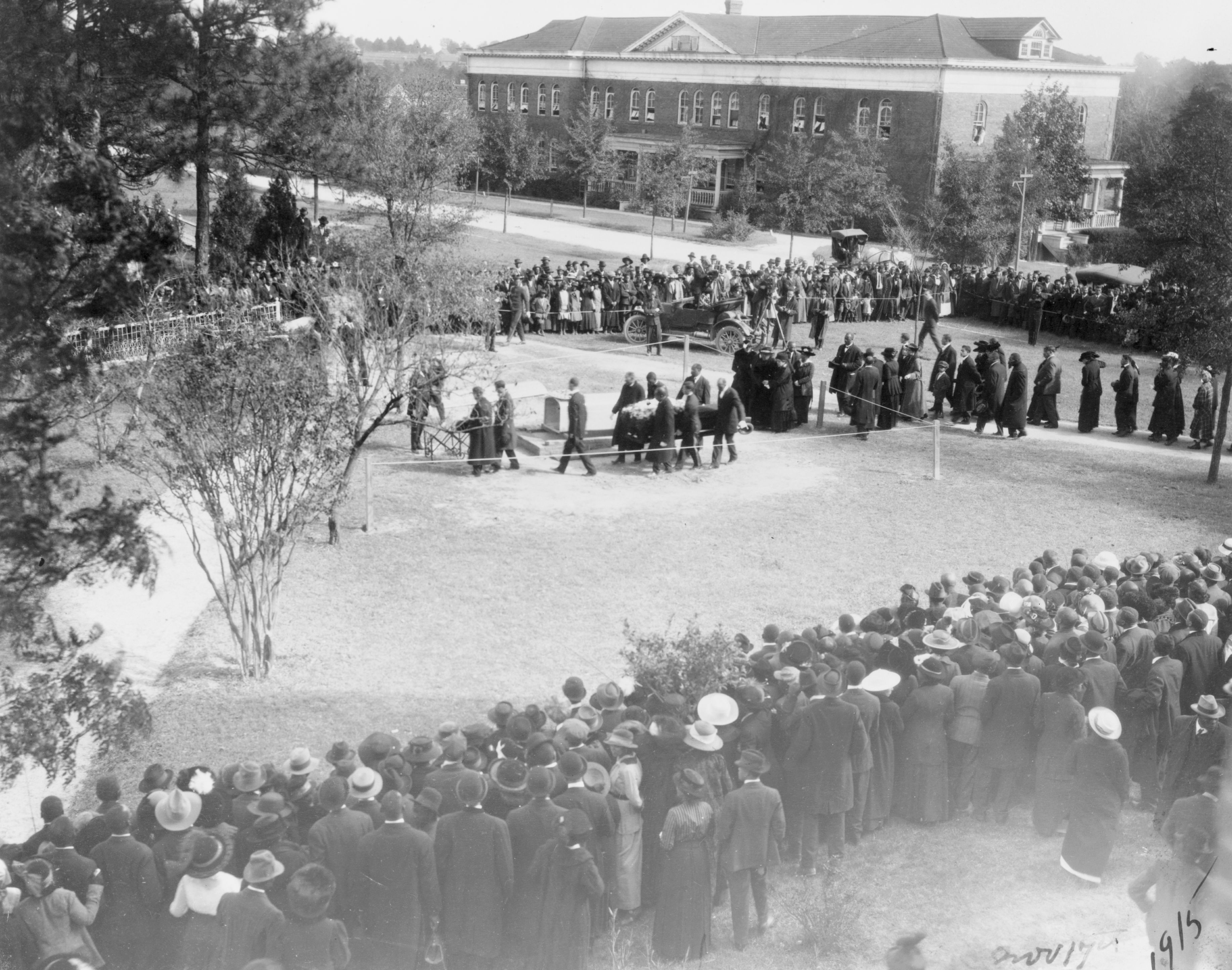
Booker T. Washington's coffin being carried to the grave site

Despite his extensive travels and widespread work, Washington continued as principal of Tuskegee. Washington's health was deteriorating rapidly in 1915; he collapsed in New York City and was diagnosed by two different doctors as having Bright's disease, an inflammation of the kidneys, today called nephritis. Told he had only a few days left to live, Washington expressed a desire to die at Tuskegee. He boarded a train and arrived in Tuskegee shortly after midnight on November 14, 1915. He died a few hours later at the age of 59. His funeral was held on November 17, 1915, in the Tuskegee Institute Chapel. It was attended by nearly 8,000 people. He was buried nearby in the Tuskegee University Campus Cemetery.

At the time, he was thought to have died of congestive heart failure, aggravated by overwork. In March 2006, his descendants permitted examination of medical records: these showed he had hypertension, with a blood pressure more than twice normal, and that he died of kidney failure brought on by high blood pressure.

At Washington's death, Tuskegee's endowment was close to $2,000,000 (equivalent to $63,651,316 in 2025). Washington's greatest life's work, the education of Black people in the South, was well underway and expanding.

== Honors and memorials ==
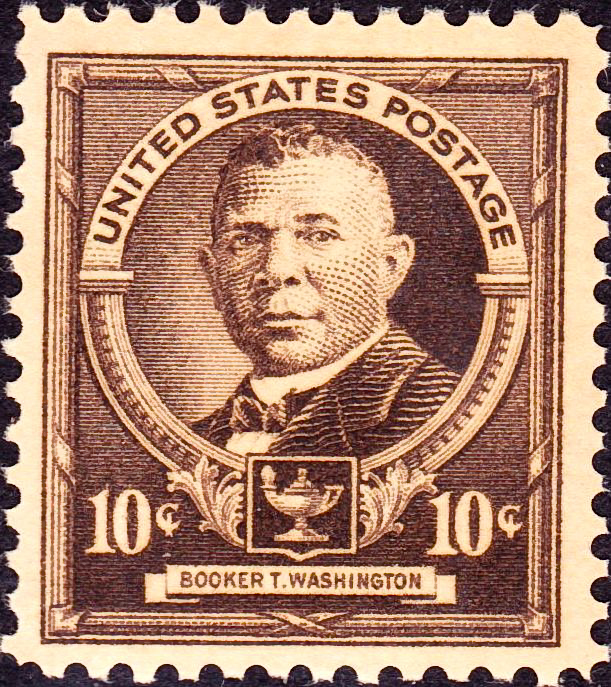
Booker T. Washington was honored on a commemorative stamp, issue of 1940, the first African American to appear on a US postage stamp.

For his contributions to American society, Washington was granted an honorary master's degree from Harvard University in 1896, followed by an honorary doctorate from Dartmouth College.

At the center of Tuskegee University, the Booker T. Washington Monument was dedicated in 1922. Called Lifting the Veil of Ignorance, the monument has an inscription reading:

He lifted the veil of ignorance from his people and pointed the way to progress through education and industry.

In 1934, Robert Russa Moton, Washington's successor as president of Tuskegee University, arranged an air tour for two African-American aviators. Afterward the plane was renamed as the Booker T. Washington.

On April 7, 1940, Booker T. Washington became the first African American depicted on a United States postage stamp. The ten-cent commemorative stamp was issued by the United States Post Office Department under Postmaster General James A. Farley.

In 1942, the Liberty ship Booker T. Washington was named in his honor, the first major oceangoing vessel to be named after an African American. The ship was christened by noted singer Marian Anderson.

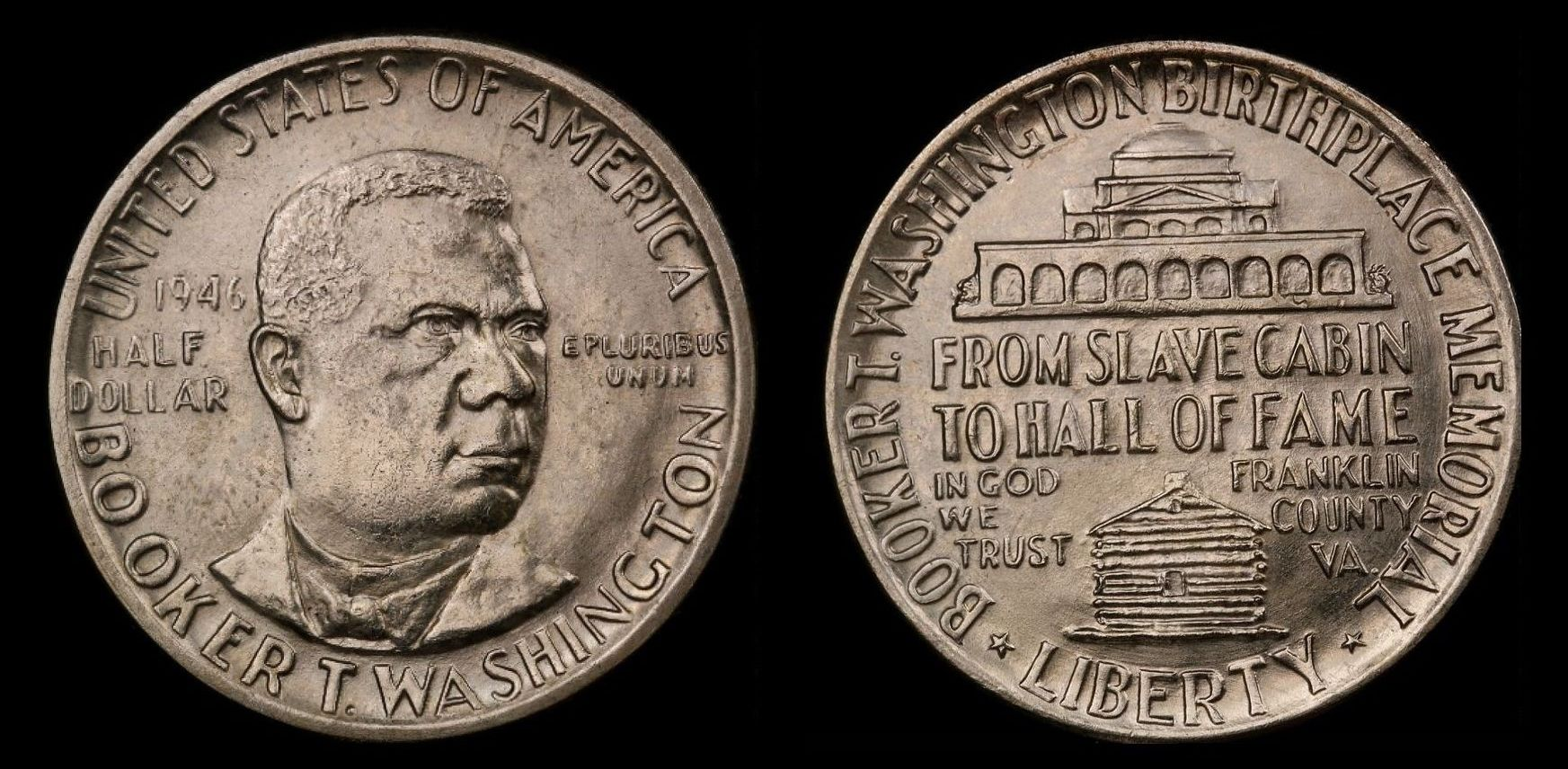
Booker T. Washington on a U.S. half dollar, 1946 mintage

In 1946, he was honored on the first coin to feature an African American, the Booker T. Washington Memorial half dollar, which was minted by the United States until 1951. Washington and Carver were depicted on the Carver-Washington half dollar, minted from 1951 to 1954.

On April 5, 1956, the hundredth anniversary of Washington's birth, the house where he was born in Franklin County, Virginia was designated as the Booker T. Washington National Monument.

A state park in Chattanooga, Tennessee, was named in his honor, as was a bridge spanning the Hampton River adjacent to his alma mater, Hampton University.

In 1984, Hampton University dedicated a Booker T. Washington Memorial on campus near the historic Emancipation Oak, establishing, in the words of the university, "a relationship between one of America's great educators and social activists, and the symbol of Black achievement in education".

Numerous high schools, middle schools and elementary schools across the United States have been named after Booker T. Washington.

In 2000, West Virginia State University (WVSU; then West Va. State College), in cooperation with other organizations including the Booker T. Washington Association, established the Booker T. Washington Institute, to honor Washington's boyhood home, the old town of Malden, and Washington's ideals.

On October 19, 2009, WVSU dedicated a monument to Booker T. Washington. The event took place at WVSU's Booker T. Washington Park in Malden, West Virginia. The monument also honors the families of African ancestry who lived in Old Malden in the early 20th century and who knew and encouraged Washington. Special guest speakers at the event included West Virginia Governor Joe Manchin III, Malden attorney Larry L. Rowe, and the president of WVSU. Musical selections were provided by the WVSU "Marching Swarm".

At the end of the 2008 presidential election, the defeated Republican candidate Senator John McCain recalled the stir caused a century before when President Theodore Roosevelt invited Booker T. Washington to the White House. McCain noted the evident progress in the country with the election of Democratic Senator Barack Obama as the first African-American President of the United States.

Booker T Washington's summer house located on Long Island in Fort Salonga, New York, that he owned between 1911 and 1914 still stands. It is now landmark, dedicated and protected by the Town of Huntington, and was recently bought out by preservation activists in 2022 to protect the house as its original status.

== Legacy ==
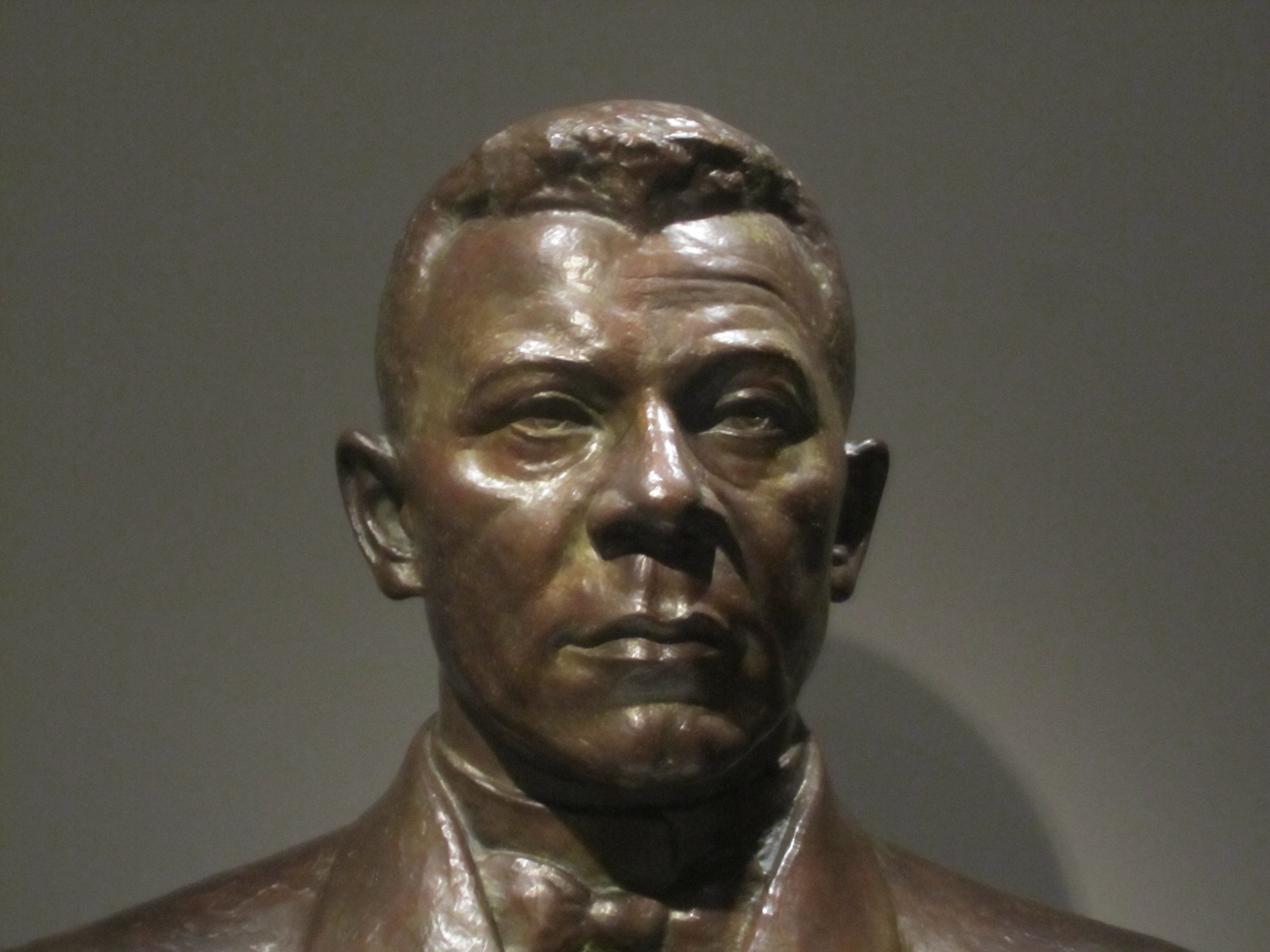
Sculpture of Booker T. Washington at the National Portrait Gallery in Washington, D.C.

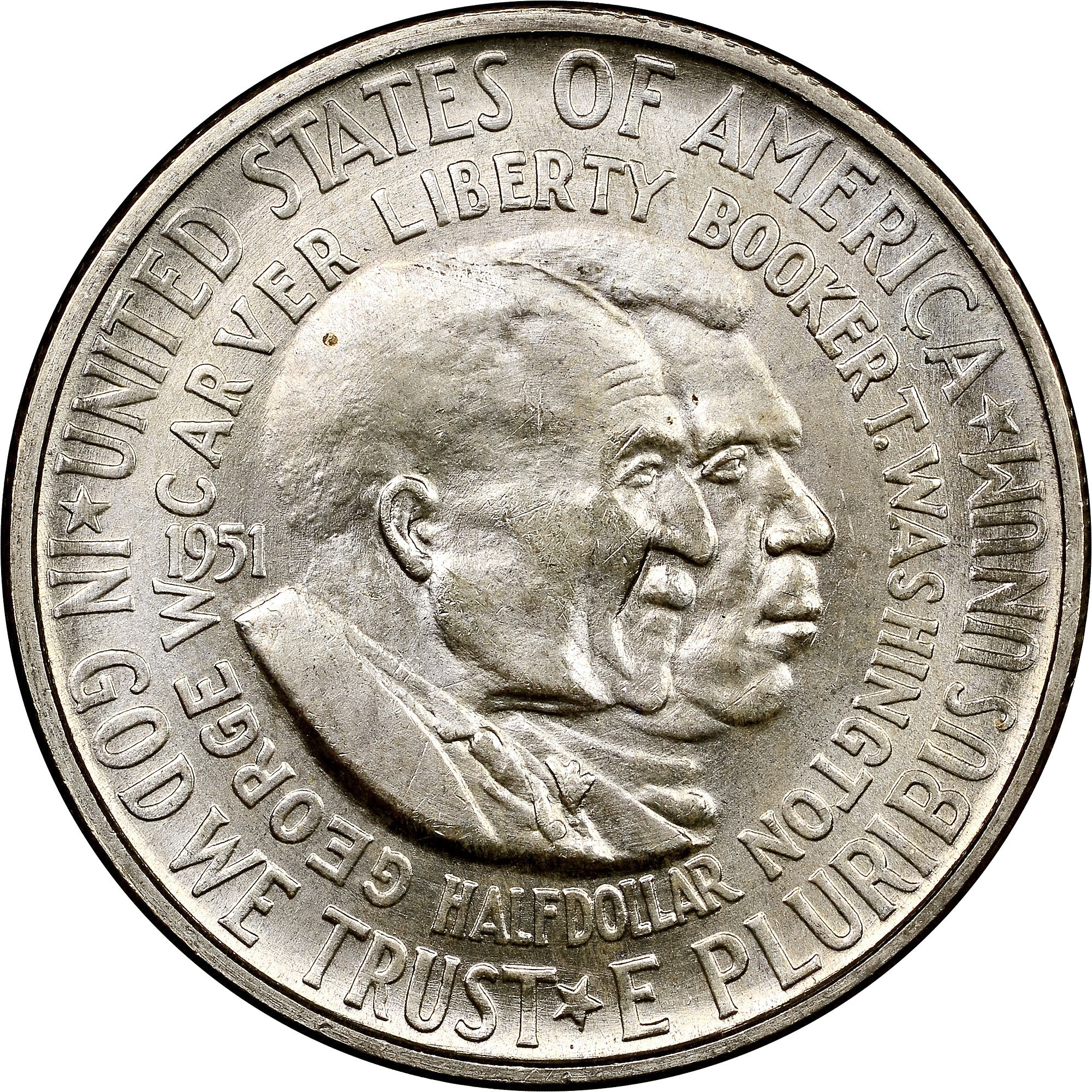
1951 Carver-Washington half dollar

Booker T. Washington was so acclaimed as a public leader that the period of his activity, from 1880 to 1915, has been called the Age of Booker T. Washington. Historiography on Washington, his character, and the value of that leadership has varied dramatically. After his death, he came under heavy criticism in the civil rights community for accommodationism to white supremacy. However, since the late 20th century, a more balanced view of his very wide range of activities has appeared. As of 2010, the most recent studies, "defend and celebrate his accomplishments, legacy, and leadership".

Washington was held in high regard by business-oriented conservatives, both white and black. Historian Eric Foner argues that the freedom movement of the late nineteenth century changed directions so as to align with America's new economic and intellectual framework. Black leaders emphasized economic self-help and individual advancement into the middle class as a more fruitful strategy than political agitation. There was emphasis on education and literacy throughout the period after the Civil War. Washington's famous Atlanta speech of 1895 marked this transition, as it called on Black people to develop their farms, their industrial skills, and their entrepreneurship as the next stage in emerging from slavery.

By this time, Mississippi had passed a new constitution, and other Southern states were following suit, or using electoral laws to raise barriers to voter registration; they completed disenfranchisement of Black people at the turn of the 20th century to maintain white supremacy. But at the same time, Washington secretly arranged to fund numerous legal challenges to such voting restrictions and segregation, which he believed was the way they had to be attacked.

Washington repudiated the historic abolitionist emphasis on unceasing agitation for full equality, advising Black people that it was counterproductive to fight segregation at that point. Foner concludes that Washington's strong support in the black community was rooted in its widespread realization that, given their legal and political realities, frontal assaults on white supremacy were impossible, and the best way forward was to concentrate on building up their economic and social structures inside segregated communities. Historian C. Vann Woodward in 1951 wrote of Washington: "The businessman's gospel of free enterprise, competition, and laissez faire never had a more loyal exponent."

Historians since the late 20th century have been divided in their characterization of Washington: some describe him as a visionary capable of "read[ing] minds with the skill of a master psychologist", who expertly played the political game in nineteenth-century Washington by its own rules. Others say he was a self-serving, crafty narcissist who threatened and punished those in the way of his personal interests, traveled with an entourage, and spent much time fundraising, signing autographs, and giving flowery patriotic speeches with much flag waving – acts more indicative of an artful political boss than an altruistic civil rights leader.

People called Washington the "Wizard of Tuskegee" because of his highly developed political skills and his creation of a nationwide political machine based on the black middle class, white philanthropy, and Republican Party support. Opponents called this network the "Tuskegee Machine". Washington maintained control because of his ability to gain support of numerous groups, including influential whites and black business, educational and religious communities nationwide. He advised as to the use of financial donations from philanthropists and avoided antagonizing white Southerners with his accommodation to the political realities of the age of Jim Crow segregation.

The Tuskegee machine collapsed rapidly after Washington's death. He was the charismatic leader who held it all together, with the aid of Emmett Jay Scott. But the trustees replaced Scott, and the elaborate system fell apart. Critics in the 1920s to 1960s, especially those connected with the NAACP, ridiculed Tuskegee as a producer of a class of submissive black laborers. Since the late 20th century, historians have given much more favorable view, emphasizing the school's illustrious faculty and the progressive black movements, institutions and leaders in education, politics, architecture, medicine and other professions it produced who worked hard in communities across the United States, and indeed worldwide across the African Diaspora. Deborah Morowski points out that Tuskegee's curriculum served to help students achieve a sense of personal and collective efficacy. She concludes:

The social studies curriculum provided an opportunity for the uplift of African Americans at time when these opportunities were few and far between for black youth. The curriculum provided inspiration for African Americans to advance their standing in society, to change the view of southern whites toward the value of Black people, and ultimately, to advance racial equality.

At a time when most black Americans were poor farmers in the South and were ignored by the national black leadership, Washington's Tuskegee Institute made their needs a high priority. It lobbied for government funds and especially from philanthropies that enabled the institute to provide model farming techniques, advanced training, and organizational skills. These included Annual Negro Conferences, the Tuskegee Experiment Station, the Agricultural Short Course, the Farmers' Institutes, the Farmers' County Fairs, the Movable School, and numerous pamphlets and feature stories sent free to the South's black newspapers.

== Representation in other media ==
- Washington and his family's visit to the White House was dramatized as the subject of an opera, A Guest of Honor, by Scott Joplin, noted African-American composer. It was first produced in 1903.
- In 1949 the anthology radio drama Destination Freedom recapped his life in "Up from Slavery", written by Richard Durham.
- E. L. Doctorow's 1975 novel Ragtime features a fictional version of Washington trying to negotiate the surrender of an African-American musician who is threatening to blow up the Pierpont Morgan Library. The role was played by Moses Gunn in the 1981 film adaptation. The fictional version also featured in the musical adaptation.
- Washington was portrayed by Roger Guenveur Smith in the 2020 Netflix miniseries Self Made, based on the life of Madame C. J. Walker.
- In the HBO series The Gilded Age, Washington is portrayed by actor Michael Braugher.
- Michael Blake portrays Washington in episode 17 of season 15 "Bloodlines" (February 21, 2022) of the Canadian television period detective series Murdoch Mysteries.

== Works ==
- The Future of the American Negro – 1899
- The Story of My Life and Work (1900)
- Washington, Booker T.; Wood, Norman B.; Williams, Fannie Barrier (1900). MacBrady, John E. (ed.). A New Negro for a New Century: An Accurate and Up-to-Date Record of the Upward Struggles of the Negro Race. Chicago, IL: American Publishing House.
- Up from Slavery – 1901
- Character Building – 1902
- Working with the Hands – 1904, a sequel to Up From Slavery
- Tuskegee & Its People (editor) – 1905
- Frederick Douglass – 1906 Online
- The Negro in the South (with W. E. B. Du Bois) – 1907
- The Negro in Business – 1907
- The Story of the Negro: The Rise of the Race from Slavery (1909)
- My Larger Education (1911)
- The Man Farthest Down: A Record of Observation and Study in Europe – 1912

== See also ==
- African American founding fathers of the United States
- African-American literature
- Booker T. Washington Junior College
- Double-duty dollar
- History of African-American education
- List of civil rights leaders
- List of things named after Booker T. Washington
- Rosenwald School
- Roscoe Simmons
- Ralph Waldo Tyler
