= Up from Slavery =

1901 autobiography by Booker T. Washington

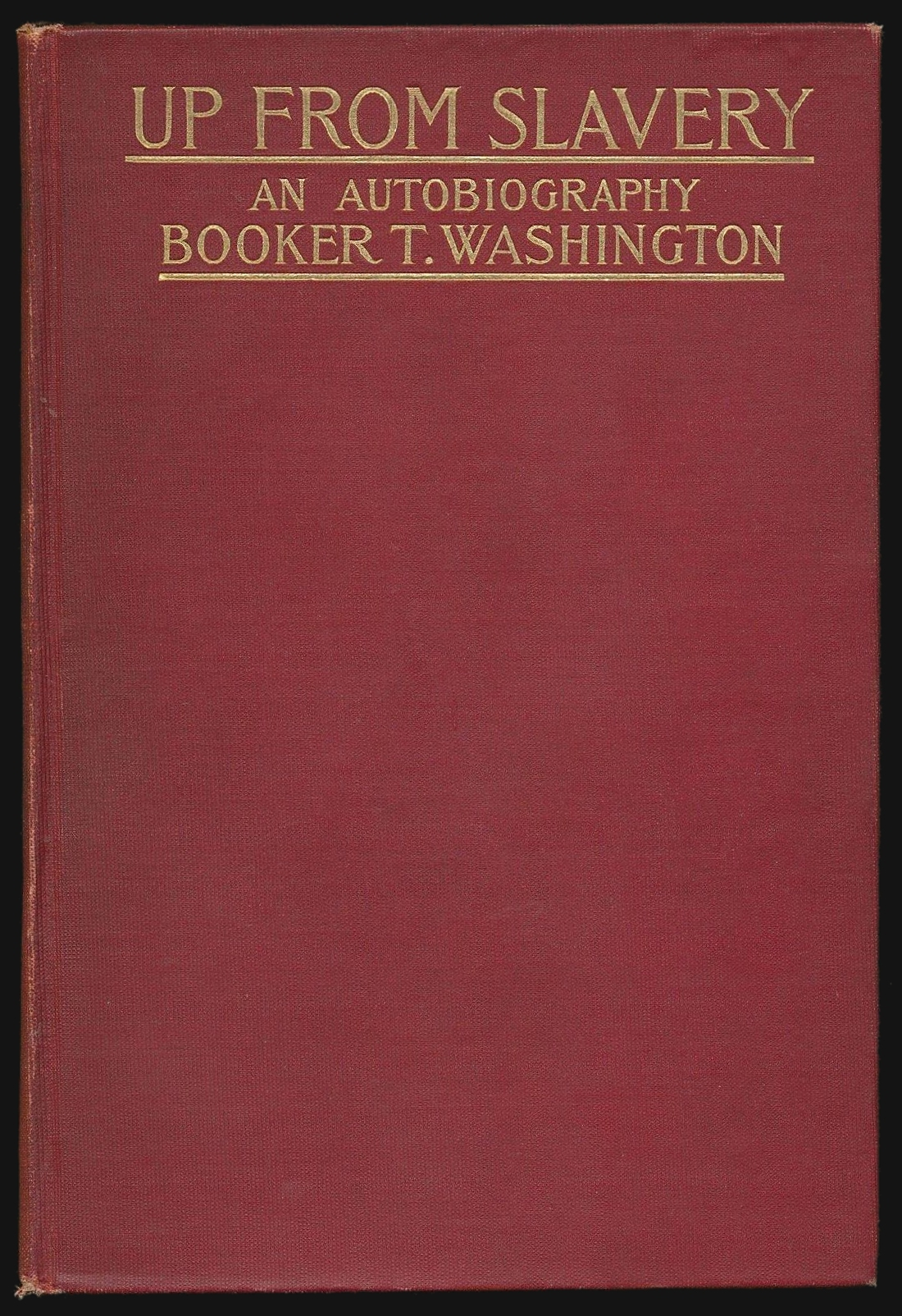
- Author: Booker T. Washington
- Language: English
- Genre: Autobiography
- Publication date: 1901
- Publication place: United States
- Media type: Print

Up from Slavery is an autobiography by an American educator Booker T. Washington (1856–1915), written in 1901 encompassing his life. The book describes his experience of working as an enslaved person during the Civil War. It also described the obstacles he overcame to obtain an education at the new Hampton Institute. His book especially focuses on his work establishing vocational schools like the Tuskegee Institute in Alabama to help Black people and other underrepresented communities learn useful marketable skills.

Up from Slavery became a best-seller, and remained the most popular Black American autobiography until The Autobiography of Malcolm X in 1965. The Modern Library, an American publishing company, listed the book at No. 3 on its list of the 100 best nonfiction books of the 20th century, and in 1999 it was also listed by the conservative Intercollegiate Review as one of the "50 Best Books of the Twentieth Century".

== Background ==
Booker T. Washington was an inspirational figure in the late 19th century. He is recognized for his contribution to education for the Black community, as well as ideology that encouraged Black Americans to rise up rather than rely on pity. His contribution to writing started in 1899, when he published his first novel alongside a ghost writer, Trinity Thomas Fortune titled The Story of My Life and Work. This book was known as an autobiography, but did not get much recognition as critics reviewed it as poorly written. He then wrote Up from Slavery as an independent author, where he reflected on his life before and after emancipation.

The America of the 1880s and 1890s was one of white hostility toward African Americans. There was also the belief that the African-American race would not have been able to survive without the institution of slavery. Popular culture played in to the ideas of "black criminality and moral decline" as can be seen in the characters Jim Crow and Zip Coon. When Washington began his writing and public speaking, he was fighting the notion that African Americans were inherently stupid and incapable of civilization. Washington's primary goal was to impress upon the audience the possibility of progress.

== Chapter summaries ==
=== Chapter 1 ===
"A Slave Among Slaves": In the first chapter, the reader is given a vivid yet brief sight of the life of slaves, as seen from the author's point of view. Basically, it speaks of the hardships the slaves endured before independence and their joys and hassles (arguments) after liberty. The first chapter explains about his suffering in that plantation and the end days of his slavery. The author feels that his life had its beginning in midst of the most miserable surroundings. He explains about his living conditions, and how his mother works hard to make the days end.

=== Chapter 2 ===
"Boyhood Days": In the second chapter, the reader learns the importance of naming oneself as a means of reaffirming freedom and the extent to which freed men and women would go to reunite their families. After families had reunited and named themselves, they would then seek out employment (often far from their former masters). The reader learns the story behind the author's name: Booker Taliaferro Washington. The second chapter also gives an account of cruel labour of both adults and children in the mines at the city of Malden. Furthermore, Booker is strongly attracted towards education and oscillates between the extensive schedule of the day's work and the school. The second chapter also describes the character of Booker's mother and her role in his life.

=== Chapter 3 ===
"The Struggle for Education": Washington struggles, in this chapter, to earn enough money to reach and remain at Hampton Institute. That was his first experience related to the importance of willingness to do manual labor. The first introduction of General Samuel C. Armstrong

=== Chapter 4 ===
"Helping Others": Conditions at Hampton are discussed in this chapter, as well as Washington's first trip home from school. He returns early from vacation to aid teachers in the cleaning of their classrooms. When Washington returns the next summer, he is elected to teach local students, young and old, through a night school, Sunday school, and private lessons. This chapter also gives the first mention of groups such as the Ku Klux Klan.

=== Chapter 5 ===
"The Reconstruction Period (1867-1878)": Washington paints an image of the South during Reconstruction Era of the United States, with several assessments of Reconstruction projects including: education, vocational opportunities, and voting rights. He speaks of the Reconstruction policy being built on "a false foundation." He seeks to play a role in forming a more solid foundation based upon "the hand, head, and heart."

=== Chapter 6 ===
"Black Race and Red Race": General Armstrong calls Washington back to Hampton Institute for the purpose of instructing and advising a group of young Native-American men. Washington speaks about different instances of racism against Native Americans and African Americans. Washington also begins a night school at this time.

=== Chapter 7 ===
"Early Days at Tuskegee": Once again General Armstrong is instrumental in encouraging Washington's next project: the establishment of a normal school for African Americans in Tuskegee, Alabama. He describes the conditions in Tuskegee and his work in building the school: "much like making bricks without straw." Washington also outlines a typical day in the life of an African American living in the country at this time. In May 1881, General Armstrong told Washington he had received a letter from a man in Alabama to recommend someone to take charge of a "colored school" in Tuskegee. The man writing the letter thought that there was no "colored" person to fill the role and asked him to recommend a white man. The general wrote back to tell him about Washington, and he was accepted for the position.

Washington went there and describes Tuskegee as a town of 2,000 population and as being in the "Black Belt" of the South, where nearly half of the residents were "colored" and in other parts of nearby counties there were six African-American people to one white person. He explains that he thinks the term "Black Belt" originated from the rich, dark soil of the area, which was also the part of the South where slaves were most profitable.

Once at Tuskegee, his first task was to find a place to open the school and secured a rundown "shanty" and African-American Methodist church. He also travelled around the area and acquainted himself with the local people. He describes some of the families he met and who worked in the cotton fields. He saw that most of the farmers were in debt and schools were generally taught in churches or log cabins and these had few or no provisions. Some, for example, had no means of heating in the winter and one school had one book to share between five children. He goes on to relate the story of a man aged around 60. He told Washington he had been sold in 1845 and there had been five of them: "There were five of us; myself and brother and three mules." Washington explains he is referring to these experiences to highlight how improvements were later made.

=== Chapter 8 ===
"Teaching School in a Stable and a Hen-house": Washington details the necessity of a new form of education for the children of Tuskegee, for the typical New England education would not be sufficient to effect uplift. Here is also the introduction of long-time partners, George W. Campbell and Lewis Adams, and future wife, Olivia A. Davidson; these individuals felt similarly to Washington in that mere book-learning would not be enough. The goal was established to prepare students of Tuskegee to become teachers, farmers, and overall moral people. Washington's first days at Tuskegee are described in this chapter, as is his method of working. He demonstrates a holistic approach to his teaching in that he researched the area and the people and how poverty stricken many were. His visits also showed how education was both a premium and underfunded, and therefore justifies the setting up of this new facility.

Tuskegee is also seen to be set in a rural area, where agriculture was the main form of employment, and so the institute's later incarnation as an industrial school that was fit for teaching its students skills for the locale is justified. He encountered difficulties in setting up the school, which he opened on July 4, 1881, and this included some opposition from white people who questioned the value of educating African Americans: "These people feared the result of education would be that the Negros would leave the farms, and that it would be difficult to secure them for domestic service."

He describes how he has depended on the advice of two men in particular and these were the ones who wrote to General Armstrong asking for a teacher. One is a white man and a former slave holder called George W. Campbell. The other is a "black" man and a former slave called Lewis Adams.

When the school opened they had 30 students and these were divided roughly equally between the sexes. Many more had wanted to come, but it had been decided that they must be over 15 and have had some education already. Many who came were public school teachers and some were around 40 years of age. The number of pupils increased each week and there were nearly 50 by the end of the first month.

A co-teacher came at the end of the first six weeks. This was Olivia A. Davidson and she later became his wife. She had been taught in Ohio and came South as she had heard of the need for teachers. She is described as brave in the way she nursed the sick when others would not (such as caring for a boy with smallpox). She also trained further at Hampton and then at Massachusetts State Normal School at Framingham.

She and Washington agreed that the students needed more than a "book education" and they thought they must show them how to care for their bodies and how to earn a living after they had left the school. They tried to educate them in a way that would make them want to stay in these agricultural districts (rather than leave for the city and be forced to live by their wits). Many of the students came initially to study so that they would not have to work with their hands, whereas Washington aimed for them to be capable of all sorts of labor and to not be ashamed of it.

=== Chapter 9 ===
"Anxious Days and Sleepless Nights": This chapter starts by stating how the people spent Christmas drinking and having a merry time, and not bearing in mind the true essence of Christmas. This chapter also discusses the institute's relationship with the locals of Tuskegee, the purchase and cultivation of a new farm, the erection of a new building, and the introduction of several generous donors, mostly northern. The death of Washington's first wife, Fannie N. Smith, is announced in this chapter. He had a daughter named Portia.

=== Chapter 10 ===
"A Harder Task Than Making Bricks Without Straw": In this chapter, Washington discusses the importance of having the students erect their own buildings: "Not a few times, when a new student has been led into the temptation of marring the looks of some building by lead pencil marks or by the cuts of a jack-knife, I have heard an old student remind him: 'Don't do that. That is our building. I helped put it up.'" The bricks reference in the title refers to the difficulty of forming bricks without some very necessary tools: money and experience. Through much labour, the students were able to produce fine bricks; their confidence then spilled over into other efforts, such as the building of vehicles.

=== Chapter 12 ===
"Raising Money": Washington travels north to secure additional funding for the institute with which he had much success. Two years after a meeting with one man, the Institute received a cheque of $10,000 and, from another couple, a gift of $50,000. Washington felt great pressure for his school and students to succeed, for failure would reflect poorly on the ability of the race. It is this time period Washington begins working with Andrew Carnegie, proving to Carnegie that this school was worthy of support. Not only did Washington find large donations helpful, but small loans were key which paid the bills and gave evidence to the community's faith in this type of education.

=== Chapter 13 ===
"Two Thousand Miles for a Five-Minute Speech": Washington marries again. His new wife is Olivia A. Davidson, first mentioned in Chapter 8. This chapter begins Washington's public speaking career; first at the National Education Association. His next goal was to speak before a Southern white audience. His first opportunity was limited by prior engagements and travel time, leaving him only five minutes to give his speech. Subsequent speeches were filled with purpose: when in the North he would be actively seeking funds, when in the South encouraged "the material and intellectual growth of both races." The result of one speech was the Atlanta Exposition Speech.

=== Chapter 14 ===
"The Atlanta Exposition Address": The speech that Washington gave to the Atlanta Exposition is printed here in its entirety. He also gives some explanation of the reaction to his speech: first, delight from all, then, slowly, a feeling among African Americans that Washington had not been strong enough in regards to the 'rights' of the race. In time, however, the African-American public would become, once again, generally pleased with Washington's goals and methods for African-American uplift.

Washington also speaks about the African-American clergy. He also makes a much disputed statement about voting: "I believe it is the duty of the Negro – as the greater part of the race is already doing – to deport himself modestly in regard to political claims, depending upon the slow but sure influences that proceed from the possession of property, intelligence, and high character for the full recognition of his political rights. I think that the according of the full exercise of political rights is going to be a matter of natural, slow growth, not an over-night, gourd-vine affair. I do not believe that the Negro should cease voting…but I do believe that in his voting he should more and more be influenced by those of intelligence and character who are his next-door neighbors…I do not believe that any state should make a law that permits an ignorant and poverty-stricken white man to vote, and prevents a black man in the same condition from voting. Such a law is not only unjust, but it will react, as all unjust laws do, in time; for the effect of such a law is to encourage the Negro to secure education and property. I believe that in time, through the operation of intelligence and friendly race relations, all cheating at the ballot box in the South will cease."

=== Chapter 15 ===
"The Secret of Success in Public Speaking": Washington speaks again of the reception of his Atlanta Exposition Speech. He then goes on to give the reader some advice about public speaking and describes several memorable speeches.

=== Chapter 16 ===
"Europe": The author is married a third time, to Margaret James Murray. He speaks about his children. At this time, he and his wife are offered the opportunity to travel to Europe. Mixed emotions influenced their decision to go: Washington had always dreamed of traveling to Europe, but he feared the reaction of the people, for so many times had he seen individuals of his race achieve success and then turned away from the people. Mr. and Mrs. Washington enjoyed their trip, especially upon seeing their friend, Henry Tanner, an African-American artist, being praised by all classes. During their time abroad, the couple was also able to take tea with both Queen Victoria and Susan B. Anthony. Upon arriving back in the United States, Washington was asked to visit Charleston, West Virginia, near his former home in Malden.

=== Chapter 17 ===
"Last Words": Washington describes his last interactions with General Armstrong and his first with Armstrong's successor, Rev. Dr. Hollis B. Frissell. The greatest surprise of his life was being invited to receive an honorary degree from Harvard University, the first awarded to an African American. Another great honor for Washington and Tuskegee was the visit of President William McKinley to the institute, an act which McKinley hoped to impress upon citizens his "interest and faith in the race." Washington then describes the conditions at Tuskegee Institute and his resounding hope for the future of the race.

== Major themes ==
=== Education ===
Booker T. Washington was known in the late 19th century for his contribution to education. He created Tuskegee Institute (now university) as a school to support the advancement of black people. He encouraged black Americans to use the skills they were known for to elevate their standings. These include carpentry, botany, shoemaking, and welding. He advocated for education and for individuals to stay in the south to uplift each other.

=== Equality ===
Booker T. Washington was a vocal figure during his time for the equality of Black Americans. He adopted a theory that is often deemed controversial by others. He fought for the equality of African Americans, but did not believe them to be equal. He believed more in accommodation for the population and believed that education and economic freedom was more important than political discourse. He also believed in the preservation of the south, and did not blame White Americans for the systemic racism during this time.

== Washington and his critics ==
Washington was a controversial figure during his lifetime, and W. E. B. Du Bois, among others, criticized some of his views. Since its publication, according to biographer Louis Harlan, Up from Slavery has been read as painting Booker T. Washington as both an "accommodationist and calculating realist seeking to carve out a viable strategy for black struggle amidst the nadir of race relations in the United States." While more contemporary ideas of black civil rights call for a more provocative approach, Washington was certainly a major figure in his time. Most critiques of him target his accommodationism, yet his private life was very much aimed at opposition through funding. The Atlanta Exposition speech shows his dual nature, giving everyone present something to agree with, no matter their intention. Washington deserves praise, in the view of historian Fitzhugh Brundage, for "seeking to be all things to all men in a multifaceted society." Many do argue against his being characterized as an accommodationist. For example, biographer Robert Norrell has written, "He worked too hard to resist and to overcome white supremacy to call him an accommodationist, even if some of his white-supremacist southern neighbors so construed some of his statements. Having conditions forced on him, with threat of destruction clearly the cost of resistance, does not constitute a fair definition of accommodation." Historians are thoroughly split over this characterization.

W. E. B. Du Bois initially applauded Washington's stance on racial uplift. At one point he went as far as to say of the Atlanta Compromise: "Here might be a real basis for the settlement between whites and blacks in the South."

The Souls of Black Folk , written in 1903 by DuBois, congratulates Washington for accomplishing his first task, which was earning the ear of the white southern population through sympathy and cooperation. Du Bois also acknowledged the unstable situation in the south and the necessity for sensitivity to community feelings, yet he believes that Washington has failed in his sensitivity to African Americans. He believes that there are many educated and successful African Americans who would criticize the work of Washington, but they are being hushed in such a way as to impede "democracy and the safeguard of modern society" Quoted from W.E.B Dubois's Darkwater, Voices from Within the Veil in 1920. This is where their paths would diverge: Washington with his "Tuskegee Machine" and DuBois with the "Niagara Movement."

In 1905, the Niagara Movement issued a statement enumerating their demands against oppression and for civil rights. The Movement established itself as an entity entirely removed from Washington in conciliation, and established a new, more radical course of action: "Through helplessness we may submit, but the voice of protest of ten million Americans must never cease to assail the ears of their fellows, so long as America is unjust". Drafted by W.E.B Dubois + others in the Niagara Declaration of Principles in 1905

For a time, the Movement grew very successfully, but they lost their effectiveness when chapters began to disagree with one another. Eventually, the Movement's efforts translated into the development of the National Association for the Advancement of Colored People (NAACP).

Of course there were other participants in this discussion of the future of the African-American race, including that of W. H. Thomas, another African-American man. Thomas believed that African Americans were "deplorably bad" and that it would require a "miracle" to make any sort of progress. As in the case of Washington and DuBois, Washington and Thomas have areas of agreement, though DuBois would not so agree: that the best chance for an African American was in the areas of farming and country life. In some respects, it is hard to compare the two as each has different intentions.

Similarly, Thomas Dixon, author of The Clansman (1905), began a newspaper controversy with Washington over the industrial system, most likely to encourage talk of his upcoming book. He characterized the newfound independence of Tuskegee graduates as inciting competition: "Competition is war…. What will the [southern white man] do when put to the test? He will do exactly what his white neighbor in the North does when the Negro threatens his bread—kill him!"

== In popular culture ==
In September 2011, a seven-part documentary series was produced by LionHeart FilmWorks and distributed by Mill Creek Entertainment. The series is not a direct adaption of Booker T. Washington autobiography Up from Slavery, but tells the story of enslavement in America. It spans the timeline from the first arrival of enslaved Africans at Jamestown in 1619, to the American Civil War in 1861, to the ratification of the 15th Amendment in 1870.

In 2024, a documentary titled Up from Slavery: The Story of Booker T. Washington came out by director Charles Dumas. He created a one man film that documented the life and education of Booker T. Washington. It has been rated as well written and well portrayed by critics, but is only accessible via his website.

== See also ==
- List of books written by Booker T. Washington
