= Altamaha =

Altamaha may refer to:

- Altamaha, synonymous name for and capital of Ocute, a powerful Native American country
- Altamaha, Georgia, an unincorporated community
- Altamaha River, in the U.S. state of Georgia
- Altamaha Technical College, a technical college in Jessup, Georgia
- Lake Altamaha, in Florida
- USS Altamaha, any of several US Navy ships
