= Racial uplift =

Term

Racial uplift is an ideology within the African-American community that describes a response of activists, leaders, and spokespersons to the racism found in the United States, particularly in the South during the post-Reconstruction era.

== History ==
This concept traced back to the late 1800s, introduced by black elites, such as W. E. B. Du Bois, Booker T. Washington, and African-American musicians like Florence Price, who were significant contributors. During the beginnings of racial uplift, hymns and negro spirituals played a vital role in shaping the spiritual culture of African Americans. Although these musical selections are mainly prevalent inside the black church, contemporary gospel music has been utilized for the liberation and uplift of the oppressed black race.

Aside from music, African-American leaders have used concepts such as Du Bois's double consciousness that describe the idea of blackness and the complexities of identity in the various lens in which the black race envisions themselves in American society. Du Bois, in his influential 1903 book The Souls of Black Folk, echoed the earlier sentiments of Frederick Douglass, by rejecting the notion that the Negro problem was the responsibility or burden of African Americans. In the very first paragraph, Du Bois established the theme of the book, asking "How does it feel to be a problem?" He wrote:

"... while it is a great truth to say that the Negro must strive and strive mightily to help himself, it is equally true that unless his striving be not simply seconded, but rather aroused and encouraged, by the initiative of the richer and wiser environing group, he cannot hope for great success. In his failure to realize and impress this last point, Mr. Washington is especially to be criticised. His doctrine has tended to make the whites, North and South, shift the burden of the Negro problem to the Negro's shoulders and stand aside as critical and rather pessimistic spectators; when in fact the burden belongs to the nation, and the hands of none of us are clean if we bend not our energies to righting these great wrongs."

Historian Kevin Gaines cites Du Bois as an example of a Black leader that utilized racial uplift ideology to combat the racism evidenced by the frequent use of the phrase "Negro problem" by whites.

The talented tenth is a primary example of racial uplift for African Americans. Du Bois was one of the black elites that steered the talented tenth to become prevalent and of importance. Struggling to make racial uplift become relevant, he believed that the black leaders that were sent out to be representatives of their community did not always return to their communities.

== Connection with eugenics ==
Eugenics is seen throughout the time of racial uplift due to the control that was placed on people of African-American descent. Eugenics play a role in how racial uplift is viewed, which includes how people are made to think, look, and create community. Some African Americans, both then and now, are said to take on roles which are prevailing in other cultures, making them alter the way in which they choose to live their life. In W. E. B. Du Bois's book, The Souls of Black Folk, he discusses his view on how African Americans are perceived both to themselves and to the ones who are around them, with the term double consciousness. Du Bois himself is known as the father of sociology and pan-Africanism, the idea of all people from African descent becoming unified across the world.

Other African-American authors such as Nathan Hare have written books which attest to eugenics not only being seen in the African-American community but also its promotion of liberation through racial uplift. In Nathan Hare's The Black Anglo-Saxons, he writes about how African Americans had begun to conform with other races and abandon their own cultural identity. Although they are now seen as a higher class, these individuals do not engage in racial uplift to guide other African Americans to where they are. Like many other Nathan Hare books, this book has caused African Americans to realize that not everyone who succeeds in life is willing to come back and give to their community. Nathan Hare himself has written many books which deal with the concept of racial uplift and how African Americans operate in a society where eugenics exist.

== Beauty culture ==
With racial uplift being seen as "self-help" for black people, other aspects focused on which African Americans were able to receive an education. The beauty culture played a role in who was sent out as a representative for the African-American community. In W. E. B. Du Bois's book The Souls of Black Folk, he discusses how hair type, color, and attitude determined who was capable of receiving an education and could return to help the black community with racial uplift. If the "wrong" individuals are sent out, then the community will be considered doomed due to that individual's incapability to perform at a certain level. Touching on eugenics, many African Americans were unaware of how the way they look, their mannerisms, and how they interact with those around them affected their capability to be well educated. With the color of a person's skin being the first physical feature people saw during this time, this led to rising colorism, a contradicting approach to racial uplift.

=== Colorism ===
Colorism, sometimes known as shadism, is when someone is treated differently due to the color of their skin by someone in their own race. People of light shades are said to be more favorable and according to W. E. B. Du Bois, these were the individuals that would have an easier time with receiving an education and passing that knowledge on to their communities. During this time, a test known as the "brown paper bag test" was used to assess the shade of an African American. This test was not only used to determine who could attend historically black colleges during the late 1800s and early 1900s, but also to be seen as a leader or relevant to their own kind.

== See also ==
- Their Eyes Were Watching God
