= The Negro problem =

The Negro problem is a sociological concept representing the economic and social conditions that blacks encountered in the Southern United States after the Reconstruction era. In some instances, the concept was analyzed in an ironic sense, by emphasizing that blacks were not a problem, but rather were the victims of racism perpetrated by the white majority in America. The concept was discussed by academics, commentators, and sociologists from around 1870 to 1950, but is no longer employed, except when retrospectively interpreting historical works. Modern sociologists use more generalized concepts, such as race relations, that can be applied to any country and any ethnicity.

== History ==
One of the references to the concept of the "Negro problem" was in 1884, when Nathaniel Shaler wrote an article in The Atlantic titled "The Negro Problem". Shaler was an academic who practiced scientific racism, and viewed the Negro problem as an issue of how the superior white race in the United States should deal with newly freed slaves. Shaler wrote "Although these defects [of African Americans] may not at first sight seem in themselves very serious differences between the two races, yet they are really the most vital points that part the men who make states from those who cannot rise above savagery."

In 1890, Frederick Douglass delivered a speech titled "The Race Problem", in which he made it clear that the notion of a "Negro Problem" was offensive to him and many blacks, saying "... I object to characterizing the relation subsisting between the white and colored people of this country as the Negro problem, as if the Negro had precipitated that problem, and as if he were in any way responsible for the problem. Though a rose by any other name may' smell as sweet, it is not in good taste to give it a name that suggests offensive associations." Douglass asserted that Southern whites had recently been using the concept of a "negro problem" in a deliberate attempt to prevent Southern blacks from gaining political power, saying:

With their usual cunning, these enemies of the negro have made the North partly believe that they are now contending with a vast and mysterious problem, the mere contemplation of which should cause the whole North to shudder and come to the rescue. The trick is worthy of its inventors, and has been played for all that it is worth. The orators of the South have gone North and have eloquently described this terrible problem, and the press of the South has flamed with it, and grave Senators from that section have painted it in most distressing colors. Problem, problem, race problem, negro problem, has, as Junius says, flitted through their sentences in all the mazes of metaphorical confusion. (Note: The "maze" phrase in the final sentence is a reference to Letter VII of British writer Junius.)

In 1895, Booker T. Washington delivered a speech in which he proposed a social and economic policy, called the Atlanta Compromise, that embodied Washington's solution the Negro problem in the South.

In 1898, W. E. B. Du Bois published an essay in The Annals of the American Academy of Political and Social Science titled "The Study of the Negro Problems", which surveyed problems faced by Black Americans, as well as the social issues created by racism in the United States.

Booker T. Washington edited a collection of seven essays, published in 1903, with the title The Negro Problem. The essay "The Talented Tenth", contributed by W. E. B. Du Bois, suggested that the leaders and academics (the "talented tenth") of African Americans are the appropriate people to address the negro problem.

Du Bois, in his influential 1903 book The Souls of Black Folk, echoed the earlier sentiments of Frederick Douglass, by rejecting the notion that the Negro problem was the responsibility or burden of African Americans. In the very first paragraph, Du Bois established the theme of the book, asking "How does it feel to be a problem?" He wrote:

... while it is a great truth to say that the Negro must strive and strive mightily to help himself, it is equally true that unless his striving be not simply seconded, but rather aroused and encouraged, by the initiative of the richer and wiser environing group, he cannot hope for great success. In his failure to realize and impress this last point, Mr. Washington is especially to be criticised. His doctrine has tended to make the whites, North and South, shift the burden of the Negro problem to the Negro's shoulders and stand aside as critical and rather pessimistic spectators; when in fact the burden belongs to the nation, and the hands of none of us are clean if we bend not our energies to righting these great wrongs.

Historian Kevin Gaines cites Du Bois as an example of a Black leader that utilized racial uplift ideology to combat the racism evidenced by the frequent use of "Negro problem" by whites.

Jamaican political activist Marcus Garvey addressed the Negro problem in a 1922 essay titled "The True Solution of the Negro Problem", where he wrote:

As far as Negroes are concerned, in America we have the problem of lynching, peonage and dis-franchisement. In the West Indies, South and Central America we have the problem of peonage, serfdom, industrial and political governmental inequality. In Africa we have, not only peonage and serfdom, but outright slavery, racial exploitation and alien political monopoly. We cannot allow a continuation of these crimes against our race. As four hundred million men, women and children, worthy of the existence given us by the Divine Creator, we are determined to solve our own problem, by redeeming our Motherland Africa from the hands of alien exploiters and found there a government, a nation of our own, strong enough to lend protection to the members of our race scattered all over the world, and to compel the respect of the nations and races of the earth.

During WW II, the United States government continued to segregate black soldiers from white soldiers. This resulted in resentment and lack of morale within the ranks of African American soldiers. Military leadership characterized this as the "negro problem", and attempted to mitigate the problem using a variety of propaganda techniques, including the employment of Joe Louis (who had enlisted in the Army) in promotional movies and tours.

In 1944, Swedish economist Gunnar Myrdal published a major academic work, An American Dilemma: The Negro Problem and Modern Democracy. His 1944 study of race relations was funded by Carnegie Corporation of New York. The foundation chose Myrdal because it thought that as a non-American, he could offer a more unbiased opinion. Myrdal's volume, at nearly 1,500 pages, painstakingly detailed what he saw as obstacles to full participation in American society that American blacks faced as of the 1940s. American political scientist, diplomat, and author, Ralph Bunche—who was the first African American to receive a Nobel Prize—served as Gunnar Myrdal's main researcher and writer at the start of the project in the fall of 1938. The book sold over 100,000 copies and went through 25 printings before going into its second edition in 1965. It was enormously influential in how racial issues were viewed in the United States, and it was cited in the landmark Brown v. Board of Education case "in general". The book was generally positive in its outlook on the future of race relations in America, taking the view that democracy would triumph over racism. In many ways, it laid the groundwork for future policies of racial integration and affirmative action.

In 1964, James Baldwin stated that he was unsure what the concept of "Negro problem" meant, writing "What do people mean when they say, 'the Negro problem'? I have never quite known what they meant." (Note: Baldwin said: "What do people mean when they say, 'the Negro problem'? I have never quite known what they meant ... What I try to suggest is that the terms in which people speak about the Negro problem have nothing to do with human beings. There seems to be some extraordinary assumption on the part of a great many people in the American Republic that Negroes are either saints or devils, that the word 'Negro' describes something, and it doesn't. There isn't such a thing as a Negro, but there is such a thing as a boy, or a man, or a woman, who may be brown, or white, or green, or whatever; but when you say "the Negro problem," you create a great big monolith, and beneath this wall are thousands of millions of human beings' lives which are being destroyed because you want to deal with an abstraction.")

== Modern concept ==
The concept of "The Negro problem" is no longer used by scholars (except when retrospectively interpreting historical works). In the 1960s, sociologists originated the concept of "race relations" which is now commonly used in academics, politics, and journalism. Race relations is a sociological concept that emerged in Chicago in connection with the work of sociologist Robert E. Park and the Chicago race riot of 1919. Race relations designates a paradigm or field in sociology, and a legal concept in the United Kingdom. As a sociological field, race relations attempts to explain how racial groups relate to each other. These relations vary depending on historical, social, and cultural context. The concept is used in a generic way to designate race-related interactions, dynamics, and issues.
