= Olivia A. Davidson =

American educator

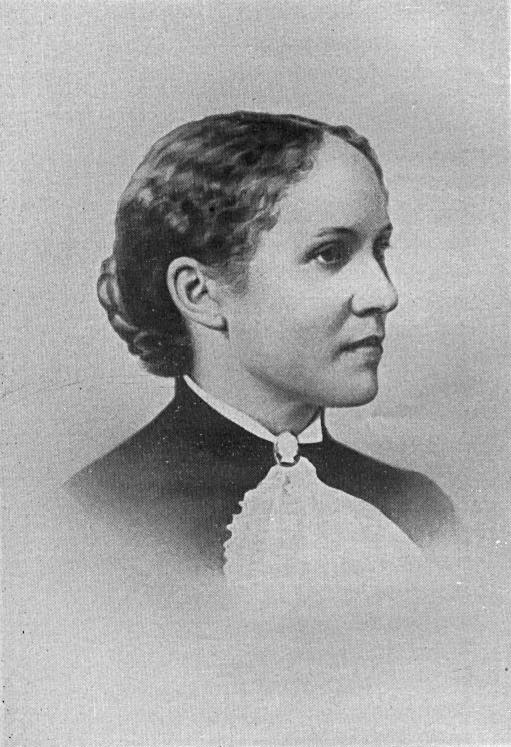
- Born: Olivia America Davidson; June 11, 1854; Mercer County, Virginia, U.S.
- Died: May 9, 1889 (aged 34); Boston, Massachusetts, U.S.
- Education: Hampton University, State Normal School at Framingham, Massachusetts
- Occupation: Educator
- Spouse: Booker T. Washington (m. 1886)
- Children: 2

Olivia America Davidson Washington (June 11, 1854 – May 9, 1889) was an American teacher and educator.

She was born free as Olivia America Davidson in Virginia. After her family moved to the free state of Ohio, she studied in common schools and later college.

Davidson was hired by Booker T. Washington as a teacher and assistant principal of the Tuskegee Institute from 1881. In this role she also did fundraising and gave public speeches, especially about the education of black women. In 1886 she married Washington. She was his second wife; they had two sons together and raised Portia Washington, his daughter by his first marriage to Fannie Smith Washington. Olivia Washington died four years later of tuberculosis.

== Early life and education ==
Olivia America Davidson was born free on June 11, 1854, in Mercer County, Virginia, now Mercer County, West Virginia. Her mother was a free woman of color and her father, Elias Davidson, had been freed from slavery. He worked in agriculture. Under the laws of slavery, children took the status of their mother. Olivia had at least two sisters and a brother; all were born free. When Olivia was a child, her family left western Virginia because of its discriminatory treatment of free blacks.

They moved to Ironton, Ohio, as it was a free state. Some time after her father died, the family moved to Albany, Ohio. Davidson continued to study at common schools. By 1870, she was living with her sister Mary and brother-in-law Noah Elliot in Gallipolis. Her sister, a dressmaker and milliner, relocated with her husband several times before they settled in the larger city of Columbus, Ohio.

== Education career ==
In 1870, at the age of 16, Davidson began teaching in towns in Ohio, Mississippi, and Arkansas. In 1874, she became a sixth-grade teacher in the new Clay Street School in Memphis, Tennessee (now Booker T. Washington High School). Her sister Margaret was also a teacher here, and their brother Joseph also lived and worked in the city. Her principal instituted changes recommended by Davidson. While Olivia was in Memphis, her sister Margaret died. In 1878 their brother Joseph was murdered by the Ku Klux Klan, at a time of violence to suppress black voting. Davidson returned to Ohio shortly thereafter.

That year she enrolled as a senior at the Hampton Institute, now Hampton University, in Virginia. She was one of the graduation speakers on May 22, 1879. From there, she attended the State Normal School at Framingham, Massachusetts (now Framingham State University), where she studied teaching. Davidson graduated on June 29, 1881, as one of six honor students.

After graduating with a degree in teaching, she taught in the Worcester Public Schools. The city's wealthy elite protested her appointment, and the school committee rescinded it.

Davidson returned to Hampton to recover from a serious illness. She also began teaching a group of Native American men who had been enrolled there as students after being released as prisoners of war from a United States fort in Florida. They were warriors from Plains Tribes who had been captured in the Indian Wars.

Booker T. Washington, the postgraduate speaker at Hampton, contacted Davidson, asking her to help him develop the new Tuskegee Institute. After recovering from her illness, she joined him on August 25, 1881, as a teacher and vice principal. She threw herself into the work despite her precarious health, becoming Washington's partner in building Tuskegee. His first wife, Fannie N. Smith, died in 1884.

On August 11, 1886, in Athens, Ohio, Davidson and Washington married. She served as stepmother to young Portia Washington, the child of Booker T.'s first marriage.

In 1886, Olivia Davidson Washington addressed the Alabama State Teachers' Association on the topic of "How Shall We Make the Women of Our Race Stronger?," advocating that teachers strive to reach black girls as the "hope of the race." During her time at Tuskegee, she also helped raise funds for the school, both locally and through her contacts in the North.

== Private life and death ==
Washington's first son, Booker T. Washington, Jr., was born on May 29, 1887. Her second son, Ernest Davidson Washington, was born February 6, 1889. Two days later, the Washingtons' house at Tuskegee burned down. Olivia Washington suffered exposure to the early morning cold and had likely already contracted tuberculosis. Her health deteriorated and she died three months later of laryngeal tuberculosis on May 9, 1889, at Massachusetts General Hospital.

== Sources ==
- "Olivia Davidson Washington," Notable Black American Women, Book 1. Gale Research, 1992.

Reproduced in Biography Resource Center. Farmington Hills, Mich.: Thomson Gale. 2008. http://galenet.galegroup.com/servlet/BioRC Document Number: K1623000473
