= Double consciousness =

Concept in social philosophy

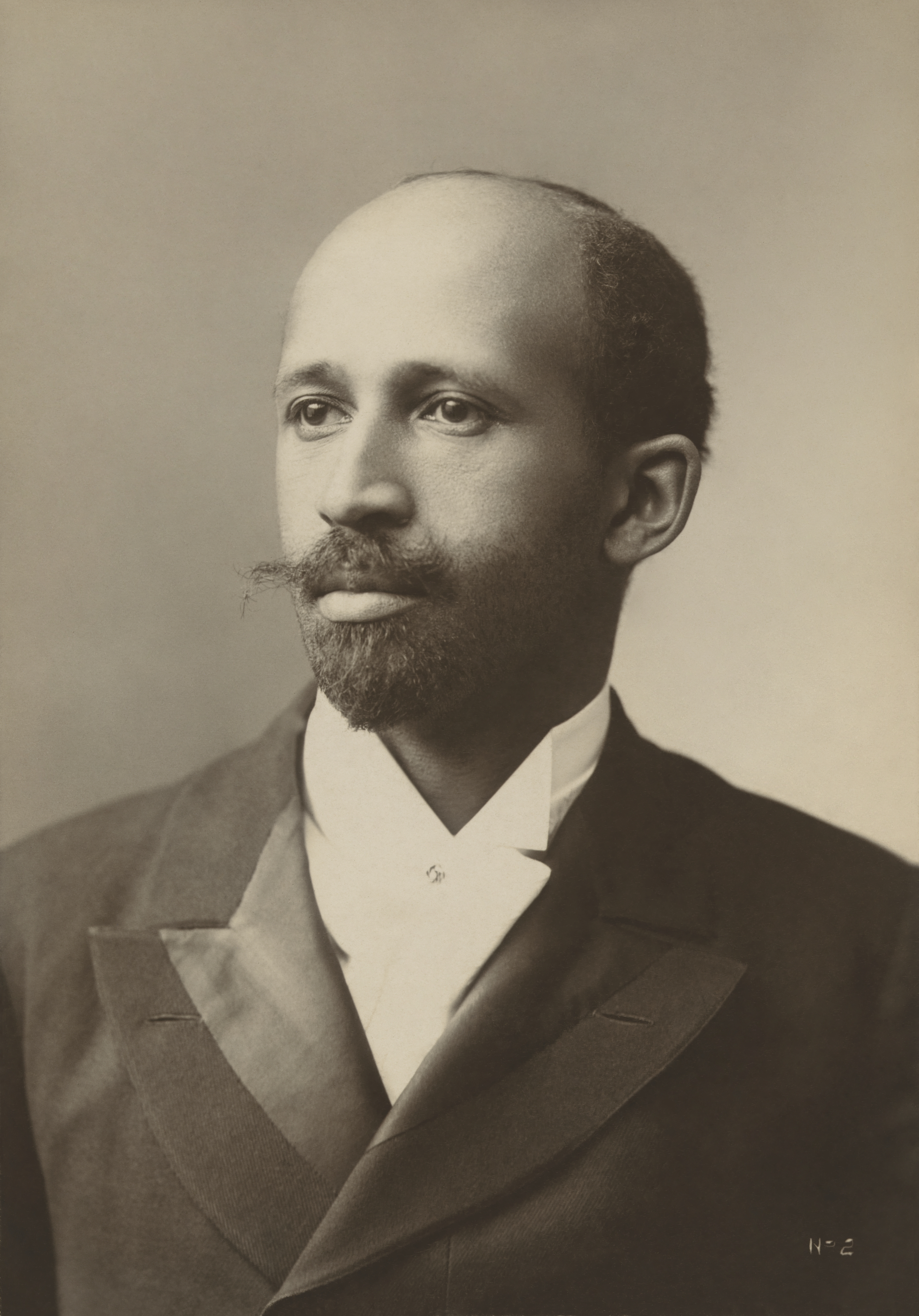
W. E. B. Du Bois in 1907

Double consciousness is the dual self-perception experienced by subordinated or colonized groups in an oppressive society. The term and the idea were first popularized by W. E. B. Du Bois's autoethnographic work, The Souls of Black Folk in 1903, in which he described the African American experience of double consciousness, including his own.

Originally, double consciousness was specifically the psychological challenge African Americans experienced of "always looking at one's self through the eyes" of a racist white society and "measuring oneself by the means of a nation that looked back in contempt". The term also referred to Du Bois's experiences of reconciling his African heritage with an upbringing in a European-dominated society.

== Origin ==
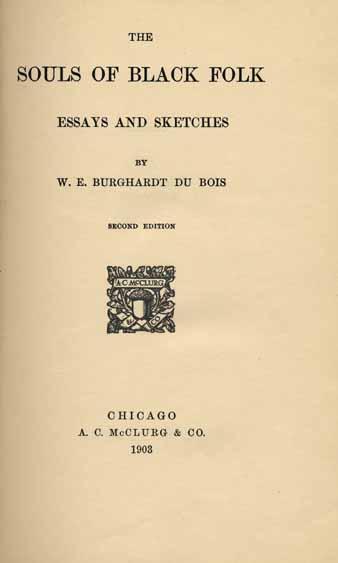
Title page of a 1903 book in which Du Bois' essay about double-consciousness was re-published

Du Bois first used the term in an article titled "Strivings of the Negro People," published in the August 1897 issue of the Atlantic Monthly. It was later republished and slightly edited under the title "Of Our Spiritual Strivings" in his book, The Souls of Black Folk. Scholars have observed the term's connections to late nineteenth-century psychological theories, including those from Alfred Binet's On Double Consciousness (1896). Du Bois describes double consciousness as follows:

It is a peculiar sensation, this double-consciousness, this sense of always looking at one's self through the eyes of others, of measuring one's soul by the tape of a world that looks on in amused contempt and pity. One ever feels his two-ness,—an American, a Negro; two souls, two thoughts, two unreconciled strivings; two warring ideals in one dark body, whose dogged strength alone keeps it from being torn asunder. The history of the American Negro is the history of this strife – this longing to attain self-conscious manhood, to merge his double self into a better and truer self. In this merging he wishes neither of the older selves to be lost. He does not wish to Africanize America, for America has too much to teach the world and Africa. He wouldn't bleach his Negro blood in a flood of white Americanism, for he knows that Negro blood has a message for the world. He simply wishes to make it possible for a man to be both a Negro and an American without being cursed and spit upon by his fellows, without having the doors of opportunity closed roughly in his face.

== Modern conceptions ==
The concept of double consciousness has been expanded on by many different scholars in the 20th and early 21st centuries. Commentators have examined how the concept can be expanded to other aspects of the African American experience, or for other marginalized groups who experience a similar forms of oppression.

=== Gilroy and the "Black Atlantic" ===
Paul Gilroy applied theories of culture and race to the study and construction of African American intellectual history. He is known especially for marking a turning point in the study of the African diasporas. His book The Black Atlantic: Modernity and Double Consciousness (1993) introduces the "Black Atlantic" as a source for cultural construction. Gilroy pioneers a shift in contemporary black studies by arguing for a rejection of the notion of a homogeneous nation-state based nationality in favor of analyzing "the Atlantic as one single, complex unit of analysis in their discussions of the modern world and use it to produce an explicitly transnational and intercultural perspective".

Gilroy based his insight on the Atlantic slave trade and marked it as the foundation for the diaspora. He recognized the significance of European and African transnational travel as a foundation for double consciousness. Gilroy used Du Bois's theory of double consciousness to suggest there exists an internal struggle to reconcile being both European and Black, which was his main focus in his book. He even characterized the Black Atlantic by the influence of slave trade "routes" on black identity. He aimed to unify black culture with the connection to the homeland as well as the cultural exchanges that occurred afterward. Gilroy's work became popular with the Black diaspora in Europe, and his theories became the foundation for several black power movements throughout the continent.

Gilroy argues that occupying the space between these two dialectal subjectivities is "viewed as a provocative and even oppositional act of political insubordination". This means that for black people across diaspora, thinking of the duality in their identity as one is almost paradoxical, and conceptualizing and actualizing this is a move of symbolic resistance in modernity.

=== Frantz Fanon ===
Very similarly to Du Bois, Frantz Fanon touched upon the term of double consciousness in his life. In his first book, Black Skin, White Masks, where he expressed his hopelessness at being neither white nor black. Fanon identifies the double consciousness that African Americans face and its source; he claimed the cultural and social confusions of African Americans were caused by European culture. He gave examples of things that he has encountered that demonstrate the double consciousness. He talks about people who preach about completely conforming to being white and says that they are wrong. He also says that the people who believe that complete rejection of whites are also wrong.

He then proceeds to talk about why black people adopt cultures that are so strange to him. He talks about how when a Black Caribbean leaves for Europe, they come back speaking a language different from their own. He also talks about how Africans, mostly the wealthiest, tend to have insecurities of not being European enough because they are African. This manifests in buying European furniture and buying European clothes.

In addition to this he talks about the way white men talk to African Americans and how it contributes to this problem of double consciousness. He says that when a white man talks to an African American man he is changing his language to a way in which a stereotypical black man would talk, similarly to how one would talk to a child, with different language sophistication and slang. He says that this angers the African American because he feels as though he has been categorized and imprisoned into a box from which he cannot escape due to this judgement. He gives an example of a film where this stereotype is portrayed and then talks about how African Americans need to be educated to not follow the stereotypes displayed by white culture.

Stephen Greenblatt also uses it to describe the peculiar quality of Shakespeare's consciousness in his biography of the bard, Will in the World (2004).

=== Triple consciousness ===
In the 21st century, Du Bois's theory of double consciousness has been revisited to develop a more inclusive concept of triple consciousness. This triple consciousness may include another intersecting identity that impacts a person's social experiences. Additional identities that may affect the already present double consciousness experience might include ethnicity, gender, sexual orientation, etc. For example, Juan Flores identified ethnicity as a potential aspect that influences double consciousness by speculating Afro-Latinos in the U.S. experienced an added layer of discrimination that combined skin color with ethnicity and nationality. Anna Julia Cooper similarly references the intersectionality of race and gender within her work A Voice from the South where she states: "Only the black woman can say 'when and where I enter, in the quiet, undisputed dignity of my womanhood, without violence and without suing or special patronage, then and there the whole ... race enters with me". Finally, Jossianna Arroyo explains that triple consciousness brings "spaces, culture, and skin ... [to] re-contextualize blackness" in the case of black Puerto Ricans.

=== Experiences of women of color ===
Scholars in Black feminist theory have expanded on W. E. B. Du Bois's concept of double consciousness to include gender, describing a “triple consciousness.” This framework suggests that Black women navigate overlapping identities of race, gender, and systemic patriarchy. According to this perspective, Black women may experience marginalization both in predominantly Black spaces, due to patriarchy, and in feminist spaces, due to racism. Deborah Gray White writes, "African American women are confronted with an impossible task. If she is rescued from the myth of the negro, the myth of the woman traps her. If she escapes the myth of the women, the myth of the negro still ensnares her".

Among the double burdens that feminists faced was fighting for women's rights as well as rights for people of color. Frances M. Beale wrote that the situation of black women was full of misconceptions and distortions of the truth. In her pamphlet Double Jeopardy: To Be Black and Female, she claimed that capitalism was the direct forebear of racism because the system was indirectly a way to destroy the humanity of black people.

"In any society where men are not yet free, women are less free because we are further enslaved because we [African American women] are enslaved by our sex." Many African American women turned towards feminism in their fight against oppression because "there was an awareness that they were being treated as second-class citizens within the Civil Rights movement of the 60's." Due to this, many women felt that they were being asked to choose between "a Black movement that primarily served the interest of Black male patriarchs, and a women's movement which primarily served the interests of racist white women."

The theory of double consciousness is also heavily present for female diasporic artists. These artists are faced with the task of remaining authentic to their roots while still branding themselves in a way to allow international and mainstream popularity. In the music industry, women of color are often stereotyped as being hyper-sexual and aggressive; which in some cases helps their branding, and in other cases, it hurts their branding and the identity they have attempted to create for themselves. Due to this, diasporic female artists are often forced to privilege certain self markers and conceal others depending on the situation; often making them feel as if they can never create one true identity for themselves but must rather change depending on the circumstances present.

=== Black Power ===
The first portion of Black Power: The Politics of Liberation, labeled "White Power", by Kwame Ture (formerly known as Stokely Carmichael) and Charles V. Hamilton, provides evidence backing up the ideology of double consciousness in regards to black people in the United States. The book opens up by defining racism as "the predication of decisions and policies on considerations of race for the purpose of subordinating a racial group and maintaining control over that group" (Hamilton & Ture, 3). Therefore, the subordinate group, black people, must think of themselves in terms of the oppressive population, white. Individual racism and institutional racism both contribute to double consciousness. On an individual level, double consciousness is practiced within every day interactions, and on an institutional level, it impacts how black people function throughout society. "Black People are legal citizens of the United States with, for the most part, the same legal rights as other citizens. Yet they stand as colonial subjects in relation to the white society." Therefore, while the Black population in the United States are essentially equal to whites under written law, there remain deeply rooted inequities between the races that reinforce double consciousness. Because these differences are not evident under the U.S. Constitution and the Bill of Rights, they are an experience.

=== In the Afro-German paradigm ===
Even though the framework of double consciousness can be applied to an African Diaspora and Transnationality, the nuances of racial dynamics differ from nation to nation. In Germany, for example, the political exigencies enforced by the Third Reich created a more nuanced situation. Tina Campt notes in Other Germans: Black Germans and the Politics of Race, Gender, and Memory in the Third Reich, the tension for Afro-Germans who "came of age during the totalitarian regime of the Third Reich ... was not necessarily experienced as one of absolute duality or 'twoness.' Rather, it was a contradictory and complexly textured form of identity". Due to the absence of a Black community in Germany, "most Afro-Germans did not have the option of choosing between a Black community or identity and a German identity". They were essentially forced to "occupy a position between a conception of German identity that excluded blackness and a conception of blackness that precluded any identification with Germanness". This means that for Black Germans during the Third Reich, the psychological dilemmas of "two-ness" did not necessarily map onto the double consciousness dynamic W. E. B. Du Bois first identified in 1897. For Black Germans in the early 20th century, there was no stable idea or community of blackness with which they could fully, or even partly, identify.

=== White double consciousness ===
In The Future of Whiteness, philosopher Linda Martín Alcoff argues that white US-Americans experience "white double consciousness" when confronted with challenges to white hegemony. Increasing calls for racial redress cause white individuals to become aware of the contradictions between their own identities and how they are viewed by the racially marginalized. Whiteness subsequently loses some degree of its normativity; increased awareness of their own complicity in systems of racial oppression then results in feelings of shame or guilt amongst white individuals. While Alcoff notes that such emotions can be productive, she argues that the discomfort of double consciousness more frequently leads to attempts to alleviate the imbalance through retreating into normative understandings of race, such as forms of white defensiveness.

In her ethnographic research amongst white Kenyans, anthropologist Janet McIntosh similarly identifies the presence of white double consciousness. However, she argues that the forms of defense and denial available to white US-Americans do not hold in the Kenyan context. This is because white Kenyans are an extreme settler minority in a post-colonial African country, meaning they cannot simply disregard non-white perspectives. Consequently, she introduces the concept of "structural oblivion" to characterize how the discomfort arising from white double consciousness is managed in the relative absence of white normativity. This encapsulates the ways in which awareness of the social structures upholding racial inequality is obscured, neutralizing moments that could otherwise spark white double consciousness.

Similar dynamics have been observed amongst white Namibians by anthropologist Nico Wilkins, who introduces the concept of "white insecurity" to describe how white double consciousness and post-colonial uncertainties generate anticipatory defensive strategies amongst white settlers. Writing on white "expats" working in the Congolese rainforest, anthropologist Thomas Hendriks also explores how white subjectivity is shaped through an awarness of how ones appears in the eyes of racially marginalized groups.

== See also ==
- Cognitive dissonance
- Dual consciousness
- False consciousness
- Generalized other
- Mixed race
- Reference group
- Shulamith Firestone
