= Portia Washington Pittman =

American musician and teacher (1883–1978)

- Born: Portia Marshall Washington; June 6, 1883; Tuskegee, Alabama, U.S.
- Died: February 26, 1978 (aged 94); Washington, D.C., U.S.
- Education: Bradford Academy
- Occupations: Educator, musician
- Spouse: William Sidney Pittman (m. 1908)
- Parent(s): Booker T. Washington and Fannie Smith Washington

Portia Marshall Washington Pittman (June 6, 1883 – February 26, 1978) was the daughter of Booker T. Washington and Fannie Smith Washington. Pittman was the first African-American to graduate from the Bradford Academy in Bradford, Massachusetts.

== Biography ==
Portia Marshall Washington was born on June 6, 1883, in Tuskegee, Alabama. She was the daughter of Booker T. and Fanny Washington. Her mother died when Portia was a young child, and her early education was away from home, mostly in New England, including at Framingham Normal School. Her secondary education included attendance at Tuskegee Institute, Wellesley College and Bradford Academy, where she graduated in 1905, the first African American to do so.

In 1908, she married William Sidney Pittman (1875–1958) with whom she had three children. The couple moved to Washington, D.C., where William established an architectural practice. After falling on financially hard times, Portia began teaching piano. In 1913, the family moved to Dallas, Texas, where William served as president of the Brotherhood of Negro Building Mechanics of Texas and Portia Taught music at Booker T. Washington High School. At this time, Portia was the chairwoman of the education department of the Texas Association of Negro Musicians.

In 1928, Portia left William, taking her daughter Fanny, and returned to Tuskegee, where she supported herself by teaching piano, music, and choir. She left the faculty of Tuskegee in 1939 because she lacked the required credentials to continue there. She returned to teaching piano privately, retiring in 1944.

Portia spent her later years preserving the memory of her late father and helped advocate for the preservation and monument status of her father's home. She died on February 26, 1978, in Washington, D.C. All of her children and her estranged husband predeceased her. Tuskegee Institute has a fellowship named in her honor.
