= USS Altamaha =

Two ships of the United States Navy have been named Altamaha, after the Altamaha River of Georgia.

- USS Altamaha (CVE-6) was transferred to the Royal Navy upon completion in 1942, becoming HMS Battler.
- USS Altamaha (CVE-18), served in the Pacific War from 1942 to 1945.
