= Lake Altamaha =

- Location within Florida
- Location: Polk County, Florida
- Coordinates: 27.8910°N 81.5988°W
- Type: natural freshwater lake
- Basin countries: United States
- Max. length: 855 feet (261 m)
- Max. width: 540 feet (160 m)
- Surface area: 8.82 acres (4 ha)
- Average depth: 10.6 feet (3.2 m)
- Max. depth: 22.1 feet (6.7 m)
- Surface elevation: 115 feet (35 m)
- Settlements: Lake Wales, Florida

Lake Altamaha is on the south side of Lake Wales, Florida, just east of Highway US 27. To the east is Miami Street and citrus groves. To the south is a motel and to the north is another motel and an abandoned restaurant. Across US 27 is Lake Wales Cemetery.

There is no public swimming beach or boat ramp on this lake's shore. However, the public can gain access both along Miami Street and US 27. The Hook and Bullet website says Lake Altamaha contains blue catfish, bullhead and gar.
