= Cotton States and International Exposition =

1895 world's industrial fair

1895 Atlanta, Georgia
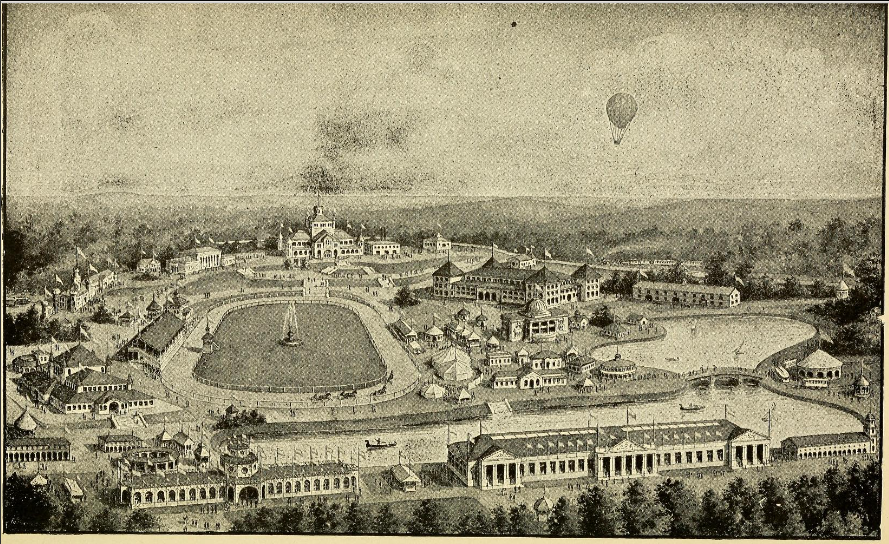
- An illustration of the event

Overview
- BIE-class: Unrecognized exposition
- Name: Cotton States and International Exposition
- Area: 11.5 acres (4.7 ha)
- Visitors: 800,000

Participant(s)
- Countries: 13

Location
- Country: United States
- City: Atlanta, Georgia
- Venue: Piedmont Park (now)
- Coordinates: 33°47′05″N 84°22′30″W

Timeline
- Opening: September 18, 1895
- Closure: December 31, 1895

Specialized expositions

The Cotton States and International Exposition was a world's fair held in Atlanta, Georgia, United States in 1895. The exposition was designed "to foster trade between southern states and South American nations as well as to show the products and facilities of the region to the rest of the nation and Europe."

The Cotton States and International Exposition featured exhibits from six states, including various innovations in agriculture and technology, and exhibits about women and African Americans. President Grover Cleveland presided over the opening of the exposition remotely by flipping an electric switch from his house in Massachusetts on September 18, 1895.

The event is best remembered for the "Atlanta Compromise" speech given by Booker T. Washington on September 18, promoting racial cooperation.

== Background ==
The idea for an international exposition in Atlanta was first proposed in November 1893 by William Hemphill, a former mayor of Atlanta. Hemphill served as vice president and director of the exposition.

Bradford Lee Gilbert was the supervising architect. He designed the Administration Building with the Main Entrance and Exits, the Agricultural Building, the Auditorium, the Chime Tower and Band Stand, the Electricity Building, the Fire Building, the Machinery Hall, the Manufacturers & Liberal Arts Building, the Minerals and Forestry Building, the Negro Building, the Semi-Circular Entrance and Exit Gateway, the Transportation Building, and the United States Government Building.

The grounds were designed by Joseph Forsyth Johnson. Over $2,000,000 was spent transforming the exhibition site. A pond was expanded to 11.5 acres (4.7 ha) Lake Clara Meer for the event. Tropical gardens, now known as the Atlanta Botanical Garden, were also constructed for the fair.

The government allocated $250,000 for the construction of a government building. Many states and countries such as Argentina also had buildings.

The Exposition was open for 100 days, beginning on September 18, 1895, and ending on December 31, 1895. It attracted nearly 800,000 visitors from the United States and thirteen countries. However, the exposition was plagued by financial issues.

== Exhibits ==
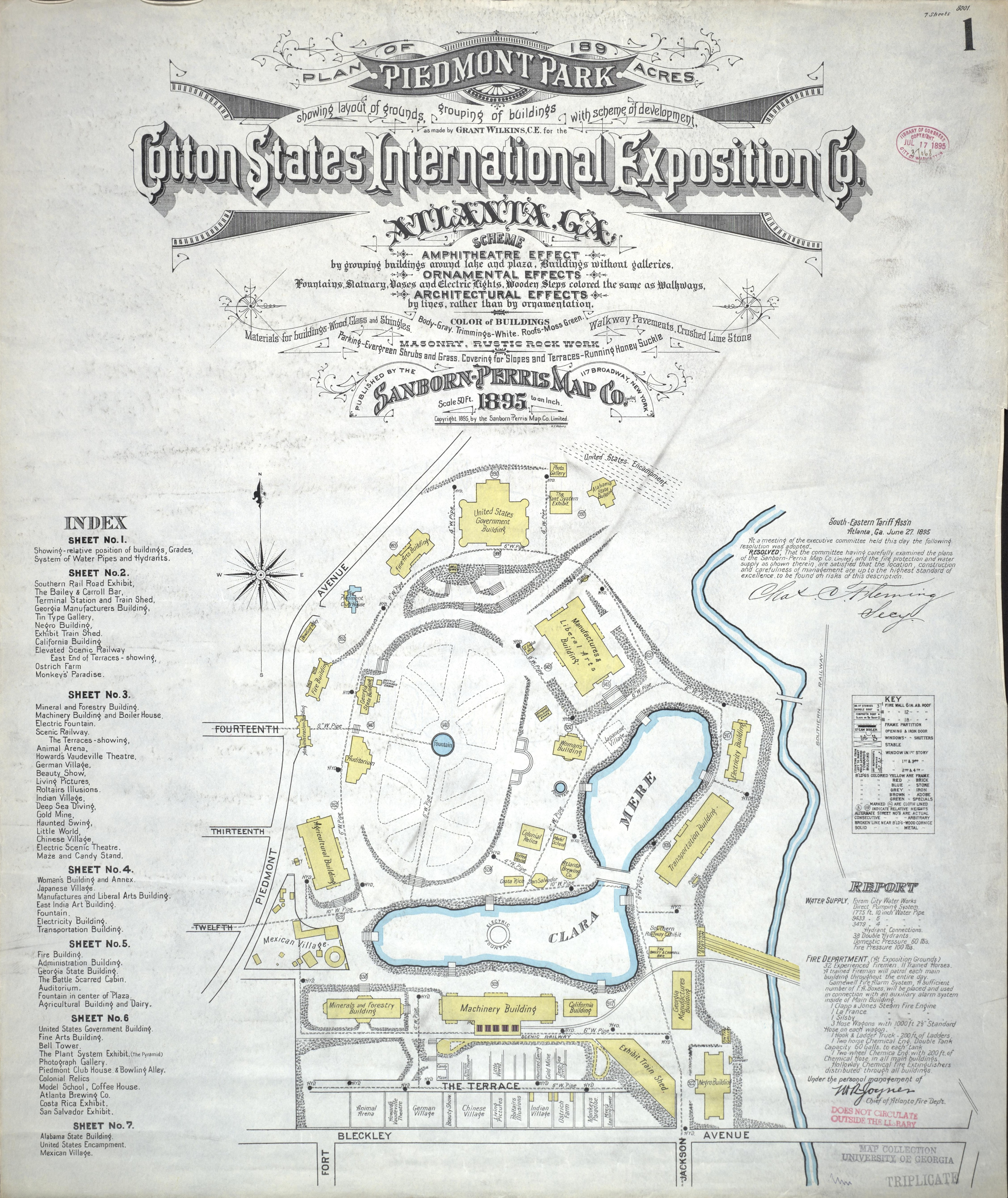
Map of the Expo

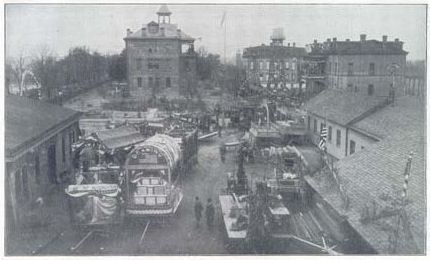
Exposition Fairway

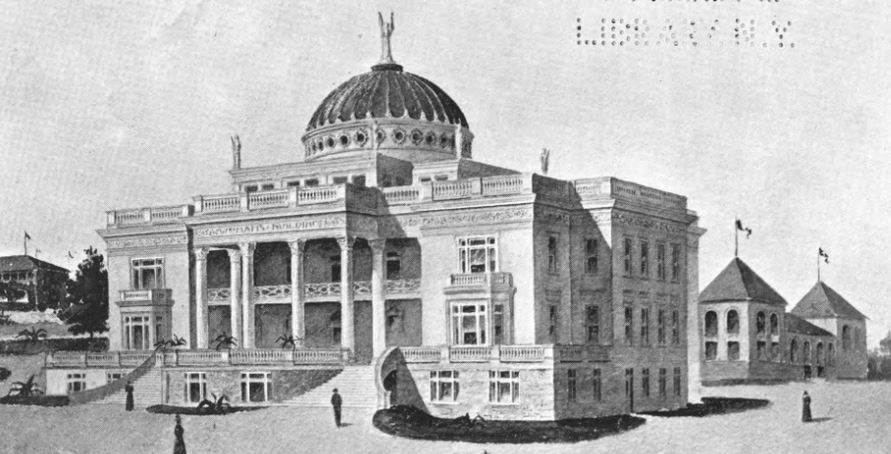
Woman's Building

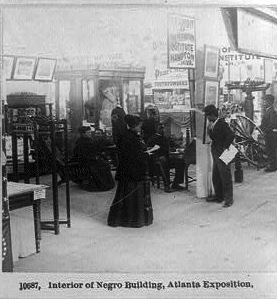
Negro Building Interior

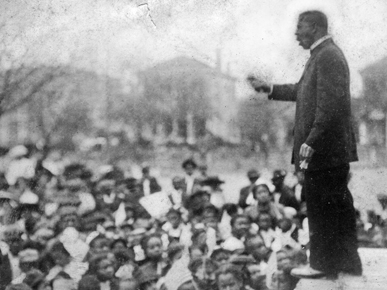
Booker T. Washington giving "Atlanta Compromise" speech

Walter McElreath described the fair in his memoirs:

The railroad yards were jammed every morning with trains that brought enormous crowds. The streets were crowded all day long. Every conceivable kind of fakir bartered his wares. Dime museums flourished on every street ... Vast stucco hotels stood on Fourteenth Street ... I spent a great deal of time on the streets looking at the strange crowds — American Indians, Circassians, Hindus, Japanese, and people from every corner of the globe — who had come as professional midway entertainers or fakirs.

The exposition included many exhibits on Minerals and Forestry, Agriculture, Food and Accessories, Machinery and Appliances, Horticulture, Machinery, Manufacturers, Electricity, Fine Arts, Painting and Sculpture, Liberal Arts, Education, and Literature. About 6,000 exhibits were examined by the Award Committee. The Awards Committee awarded a total of 1,573 medals: 634 gold medals, 444 silver medals, and 495 bronze medals.

In late September Charles Francis Jenkins demonstrated an early movie projector called the "Phantoscope." Organist and composer Fannie Morris Spencer chaired the exposition’s music committee. John Philip Sousa composed his famous march, "King Cotton", for the exposition and dedicated it to the people of Georgia.

December 26, 1895, was "Negro Day" at the exposition. Famed African American quilter Harriet Powers attended this day and met with Irvine Garland Penn, the chief of the Negro Building.

The National League of Mineral Painters, with Adelaïde Alsop Robineau and Mary Chase Perry, contributed decorative objects and artwork to the New York City exhibit. An electric railway was built for the exposition by the Dixie Intramural Railway Company, founded and presided by Col. Ira Yale Sage.

=== Women's Building ===
Pennsylvania's first woman American architect, Elise Mercur (1864–1947) designed the Palladian style Woman's Building. The Women's Building showcased accomplishments of women throughout the South, and the country, in the areas of education, health care, and the fine and decorative arts. Its exhibitions were curated by women from Georgia. The contents were contributed by women around the country. Women culled historical artifacts, decorative arts objects, and industrial products to compose displays in each room, including the Baltimore Room, the Lucy Cobb Room, Mary Ball Washington Tea Room, the Columbus Room, Model Library, Assembly Hall, and others, each assigned to a different state. The many elaborate displays reflected a diversity of views spanning the mainstream social and domestic roles of Southern women, such as patriotism and the ideals of traditional motherhood to little-known achievements of women counter to mainstream stereotypes.

The Legion of Loyal Women display presented an arrangement of 45 dolls, each one adorned with a small shield showing the name of a state, to illustrate the American Patriotic salute. Other displays posed a challenge to the roles of women and other social conventions. The Colonial Room presented utensils and furnishings, as well as Dolly Madison's spectacles, a gun carried in the Battle of Concord, and brass medallions belonging to George Washington; the display was said to represent "the growing bond of cooperation between the North and South."

The exposition introduced new ideas to foster trade and collaboration between the Southern and Northern states and to also show ideas, products, and facilities to the rest of the nation and to Europe. The exhibitions presented prototypes for a hospital room, a nursery, a kindergarten classroom, and a model library—each one in working order. These functional rooms represented the environments where women played important roles outside the home and family, and were equipped with the most up-to-date equipment, features, and furnishings. The model library included a collection of publications by women authors from every state in the nation. A photography exhibition featured portraits of women in every branch of literature, appended with a verse, letter, or section of a manuscript by the authors.

== Booker T. Washington's speech ==
On September 18, 1895, Booker T. Washington gave his Atlanta Compromise Speech on the topic of race relations. Washington's speech laid the foundation for the Atlanta Compromise, an agreement between African American leaders and Southern white leaders in which blacks would work meekly and submit to white political rule, while whites guaranteed that blacks would receive basic education and due process of law. The speech was presented before a predominantly white audience and has been recognized as one of the most important, influential, and controversial speeches in American history.

== Legacy ==
The Cotton States Exposition successfully showcased Atlanta as a business center and attracted investment to the city. After the exposition, the grounds were purchased by the City of Atlanta and became Piedmont Park and the Atlanta Botanical Garden. The buildings were demolished, but the park grounds remain largely as Joseph Forsyth Johnson designed it for the exposition. However, the stone balustrades scattered around the park are the only remaining part of the enormous main building.
