= Fannie Smith Washington =

Educator and wife of Booker T. Washington

- Born: Fannie Virginia Norton Smith; 1858; Malden, Kanawha County, West Virginia, U.S.
- Died: May 4, 1884 (aged 25–26); Tuskegee, Macon County, Alabama, U.S.
- Education: Hampton Institute
- Occupation: Educator
- Known for: Aided early development of Tuskegee Institute
- Spouse(s): Booker T. Washington, m. 1882
- Children: Portia Marshall Washington
- Parent(s): Samuel and Celia (or Cecilia) Smith

Fannie Smith Washington (1858 – May 4, 1884) was an American educator, and the first wife of Booker T. Washington. Before her premature death in 1884, Fannie Washington aided her husband in the early development of the Tuskegee Institute.

== Early life ==
Born sometime in 1858, Fannie Virginia Norton Smith (sometimes spelled "Fanny") grew up in what is now Malden, Kanawha County, West Virginia. Her father was Samuel Smith, said to be part Shawnee, and her mother was Celia (or Cecelia) Smith. Malden being the same town where Booker T. Washington lived from the age of nine to when he was 16, the pair were likely acquainted from an early age.

== Education ==
Smith grew up in a rural area without a lot of opportunity for education, especially for a black woman. However, she was able to pursue advanced studies through hard work and determination.

As a young woman, she attended the day program at a local school in Malden, with around 80 or 90 fellow pupils. Her intellect and determination attracted the attention of her teacher at the time, Booker T. Washington. Washington, only two years Fannie's senior, paid special attention to those students he considered to have promise, and often prepared them to enter and attend the Hampton Institute in Hampton, Virginia. These students were known colloquially as "Booker Washington's boys", Fannie being the only woman in the group at the time.

Soon after gaining admission to the Hampton Institute, Fannie Smith fell behind in payments, and temporarily left Hampton in 1878. For the next two years, she taught at a school near Malden in order to save money for her own education. In addition to a daily three-mile walk to and from the school, Smith was also acting as a primary caregiver for her mother. In January 1880, she sent her final payment of $48 to J. F. B. Marshall. At that point, Smith was earning $32.50 a month through her teacher's salary, but most of it was being used to meet household expenses. She was placed on the roll of honor, as a student "who, leaving the school in debt to it, have paid their debts in full from their earnings as teachers or otherwise". Smith returned to the Hampton Institute, graduating in June 1882.

== Marriage and work at Tuskegee Institute ==
After Smith's graduation from the Hampton Institute in 1882, she and Booker T. Washington were married in Rice's Zion Baptist Church in the Tinkersville section of Malden on August 2 of that year. She was 24 years old and he was 26. Her mother, Celia, was "unenthusiastic" about the marriage because of Booker T. Washington's unimpressive financial situation and because the marriage would take her daughter so far from home.

The new couple moved to Tuskegee, Alabama, where Washington had accepted the position of principal of a new school for black children the year before. The Washingtons rented a large home, and soon invited four other faculty members of the Tuskegee Institute to board with them. Fannie assumed the responsibility of institute housekeeper. She also immediately joined the faculty of the fledgling Tuskegee Institute, and is credited for broadening the curriculum for female students and developing the school's home economics program.

Her husband described their symbiotic working relationship and Smith's dedication to the school's early stages, stating: "From the first she most earnestly devoted her thought and time to the work of the school, and was completely one with me in every interest and ambition."

Smith gave birth to the couple's only child, Portia Marshall Washington, in 1883.

== Death ==
On May 4, 1884, Fannie Smith Washington died suddenly of unknown causes. An account of her death, published in the Alumni Journal at Hampton, contained the following:

Her death is indeed a serious bereavement to Mr. Washington, whose acquaintance and regard for the deceased had begun in their childhood. Their happy union had done much to lighten the arduous duties developing upon him in the management of his school. To his friends he had several times expressed the great comfort his family life was to him.

Fanny Smith Washington is buried in the Tuskegee University Campus Cemetery in Tuskegee, Macon County, Alabama. Although her name is interchangeably spelled "Fannie" and "Fanny", the seemingly less common spelling of "Fanny" is engraved on her tombstone.
