= Altamaha, Georgia =

Unincorporated community in Georgia, U.S.

Coordinates: 31°57′42″N 82°12′26″W

Altamaha is an unincorporated community in Tattnall County, in the U.S. state of Georgia.

== History ==
A post office called Altamaha was established in 1876, and remained in operation until 1945. The community takes its name from the nearby Altamaha River.
