= The Souls of Black Folk =

1903 essay collection by W. E. B. Du Bois

The Souls of Black Folk: Essays and Sketches
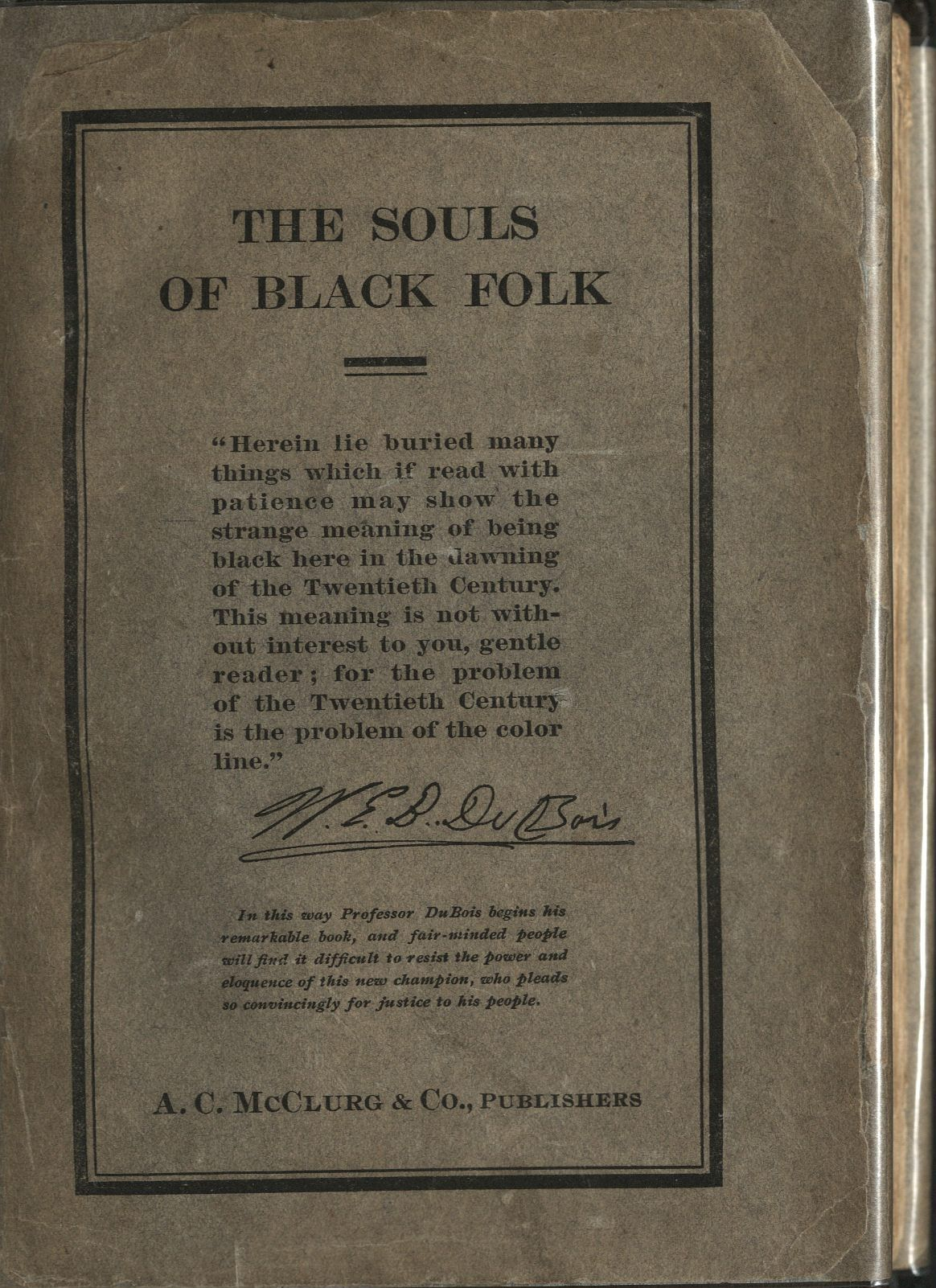
- First edition dust jacket cover
- Author: W. E. B. Du Bois
- Illustrator: Jonathan Birgen
- Cover artist: Jonathan Birgen
- Language: English
- Subject: Race and ethnicity in the United States; African-American culture
- Genre: Essays, sociology
- Publisher: A. C. McClurg & Co., Chicago
- Publication date: 1903
- Publication place: United States
- Dewey Decimal: 973.0496073
- LC Class: E185.6 .D797
- Text: The Souls of Black Folk: Essays and Sketches at Wikisource

The Souls of Black Folk: Essays and Sketches is a work of American literature by W. E. B. Du Bois, published by A. C. McClurg & Co. on 18 April 1903. It is a seminal work in the history of sociology and a cornerstone of African-American literature.

The book contains several essays on race, some of which had been published earlier in The Atlantic Monthly. To develop this work, Du Bois drew from his own experiences as an African American in American society. Outside of its notable relevance in African-American history, The Souls of Black Folk also holds an important place in social science as one of the early works in the field of sociology.

In The Souls of Black Folk, Du Bois used the term "double consciousness", perhaps taken from Ralph Waldo Emerson ("The Transcendentalist" and "Fate"), applying it to the idea that black people must have two fields of vision at all times. They must be conscious of how they view themselves, as well as being conscious of how the world views them.

== Chapters ==
Each chapter in The Souls of Black Folk begins with a pair of epigraphs: text from a poem, usually by a European poet, and the musical score of a spiritual, which Du Bois describes in his foreword ("The Forethought") as "some echo of haunting melody from the only American music which welled up from black souls in the dark past". Columbia University English and comparative literature professor Brent Hayes Edwards writes:

It is crucial to recognize that Du Bois ... chooses not to include the lyrics to the spirituals, which often serve to underline the arguments of the chapters: Booker T. Washington's idealism is echoed in the otherworldly salvation hoped for in "A Great Camp-Meeting in the Promised Land", for example; likewise the determined call for education in "Of the Training of Black Men" is matched by the strident words of "March On".

Edwards adds that Du Bois may have withheld the lyrics to mark a barrier for the reader, to suggest that black culture—life "within the veil"—remains inaccessible to white people.

In "The Forethought", Du Bois states: "Leaving, then, the world of the white man, I have stepped within the Veil, raising it that you may view faintly its deeper recesses,—the meaning of its religion, the passion of its human sorrow, and the struggle of its greater souls." He concludes with the words: "...need I add that I who speak here am bone of the bone and flesh of the flesh of them that live within the Veil?".

=== "Of Our Spiritual Strivings" ===
Chapter I, "Of Our Spiritual Strivings", lays out an overview of Du Bois's thesis. He says that the blacks of the South need the right to vote, the right to a good education, and to be treated with equality and justice. Here, he also coined the term "double-consciousness", defined as a "sense of always looking at one's self through the eyes of others, of measuring one's soul by the tape of a world that looks on in amused contempt and pity."

One ever feels his twoness,—an American, a Negro; two souls, two thoughts, two unreconciled strivings; two warring ideals in one dark body, whose dogged strength alone keeps it from being torn asunder. The History of the American Negro is the history of this strife—this longing to attain self-conscious manhood, to merge his double self into a better and truer self. He simply wishes to make it possible for a man to be both a Negro and an American, without being cursed and spit upon by his fellows, without having the doors of Opportunity closed roughly in his face.

The first chapter also introduces Du Bois's famous metaphor of the veil. According to Du Bois, this veil is worn by all African-Americans because their view of the world and its potential economic, political, and social opportunities is so vastly different from those of white people. The veil is a visual manifestation of the color line, a problem Du Bois worked his whole life to remedy. Du Bois sublimates the function of the veil when he refers to it as a gift of second sight for African Americans, thus simultaneously characterizing the veil as both a blessing and a curse.

In those sombre forests of his striving his own soul rose before him, and he saw himself,—darkly as through a veil; and yet he saw in himself some faint revelation of his power, of his mission.

=== "Of the Dawn of Freedom" ===
The second chapter, "Of the Dawn of Freedom", covers the period of history from 1861 to 1872 and the Freedmen's Bureau. Du Bois also introduces the problem of the color-line: "The problem of the twentieth century is the problem of the color-line,—the relation of the darker to the lighter races of men in Asia and Africa, in America and the islands of the sea.

Du Bois describes the Freedmen's Bureau as "one of the most singular and interesting of the attempts made by a great nation to grapple with vast problems of race and social condition." He quotes that the bureau was called "one of the great landmarks of political and social progress." After a year's work, Du Bois states that "it relieved a vast amount of physical suffering; it transported seven thousand fugitives from congested centres back to the farm; and, best of all, it inaugurated the crusade of the New England school-ma'am."

The greatest success of the Freedmen's Bureau lay in the planting of the free school among Negroes, and the idea of free elementary education among all classes in the South.

He gives credit to the creation of Fisk University, Clark Atlanta University, Howard University, and Hampton University and acknowledges the "apostles of human culture" Edmund Asa Ware, Samuel C. Armstrong, and Erastus Cravath. He worried that the demise of the Freedman's Savings Bank, which resulted in huge losses for many freedmen of any savings, resulted in freedmen losing "all the faith in savings".

Finally, he argues that "if we cannot peacefully reconstruct the South with white votes, we certainly can with black votes."

...the granting of the ballot to the black man was a necessity, the very least a guilty nation could grant a wronged race, and the only method of compelling the South to accept the results of the war. Thus Negro suffrage ended a civil war by beginning a race feud.

=== "Of Mr. Booker T. Washington and Others" ===
Chapters III and IV deal with education and progress. Here Du Bois argues against Booker T. Washington's idea of focusing solely on industrial education for black men. He advocates the addition of a classical education to establish leaders and educators in the black community.

Du Bois refers to the Atlanta Compromise as the "most notable of Mr. Washington's career." Du Bois claims that Washington wants black people to give up three things: political power, insistence on civil rights, and higher education. He claims these policies "concentrate all their energies on industrial education, the accumulation of wealth, and the conciliation of the South," which has led to "1) The disenfranchisement of the Negro. 2) The legal creation of a distinct status of civil inferiority for the Negro. 3) The steady withdrawal of aid from institutions for the higher training of the Negro." By Washington focusing on "common-school and industrial training," he "depreciates institutions of higher learning," where "teachers, professional men, and leaders" are trained. In his concluding paragraph, he writes

So far as Mr. Washington preaches Thrift, Patience, and Industrial Training for the masses, we must hold up his hands and strive with him, rejoicing in his honors and glorying in the strength of this Joshua called of God and of man to lead the headless host. But so far as Mr. Washington apologizes for injustice, North or South, does not rightly value the privilege and duty of voting, opposes the higher training and ambition of our brighter minds,—so far as he, the South, or the Nation, does this,—we must unceasingly and firmly oppose them.

Note: By the time Du Bois published his book, most of the former Confederate states had completed disenfranchisement of blacks, led by Mississippi in 1890, by constitutional amendments and other laws raising barriers to voter registration, primarily through poll taxes, residency and recordkeeping requirements, subjective literacy tests and other devices. Virginia passed similar laws in 1908. By excluding blacks from political life, southern legislatures were able to pass Jim Crow laws and other discriminatory methods.

=== "Of the Meaning of Progress" ===
In the fourth chapter, "Of the Meaning of Progress", Du Bois explores his experiences first, when he was teaching in Tennessee.

I was a Fisk student then, and all Fisk men thought that Tennessee—beyond the Veil—was theirs alone, and in vacation time they sallied forth in lusty bands to meet the county school-commissioners.

Yet, he states, after meeting with the commissioner, "but even then fell the awful shadow of the Veil, for they ate first, then I—alone."

I have called my tiny community a world, and so its isolation made it; and yet there was among us but a half-awakened common consciousness, sprung from common joy and grief, at burial, birth, or wedding; from a common hardship in poverty, poor land, and low wages; and, above all, from the sight of the Veil that hung between us and Opportunity.

He returned after 10 years and found the town where he had worked had suffered many unpleasant changes. He says: "My log schoolhouse was gone. In its place stood Progress; and Progress, I understand, is necessarily ugly."

=== "Of the Wings of Atalanta" ===
The fifth chapter is a meditation on the necessity of widespread higher education in the South.

Du Bois compares Atlanta, the City of a Hundred Hills, to the mythic Atalanta, and warns against the "greed of gold," or "interpreting the world in dollars." The "Black World beyond the Veil", should not sacrifice "Truth, Beauty, and Goodness" for the ideal of wealth attainment in public schools.

...beyond the Veil are smaller but like problems of ideals, of leaders and the led, of serfdom, of poverty, of order and subordination, and, through all, the Veil of Race.

He admonishes readers to "Teach workers to work," and "teach thinkers to think." "The need of the South is knowledge and culture," he says: "And to make men, we must have ideals, broad, pure, and inspiring ends of living,—not sordid money-getting, not apples of gold."

=== "Of the Training of Black Men" ===
Du Bois discusses how "to solve the problem of training men for life," especially as it relates to the Negro, who "hang between them and a light a veil so thick, that they shall not even think of breaking through." Du Bois cites the progress of Southern education, consisting of army schools, mission schools, and schools of the Freedman's Bureau, from the end of the Civil War until 1876. Then complete school systems were established including Normal schools and colleges, followed by the industrial revolution in the South from 1885 to 1895, and its industrial schools. Yet, he asks, "Is not life more than meat, and the body more than raiment?".

Du Bois asserts: "...education that encourages aspiration, that sets the loftiest of ideals and seeks as an end culture and character rather than bread-winning," is the right of the black as well as the white. He goes on to state, "If the Negro was to learn, he must teach himself," and cites the 30,000 black teachers created in one generation who "wiped out the illiteracy of the majority of the black people of the land, and they made Tuskegee possible."

Additionally, 2500 Negroes had received a bachelor's degree, of whom 53% became teachers or leaders of educational systems, 17% became clergymen, 17% mainly physicians, 6% merchants, farmers and artisans; and 4% in government service. From 1875 to 1880, there were 22 Negro graduates from Northern colleges and 143 from Southern Negro colleges. From 1895 to 1900, Northern colleges graduated 100 Negros and over 500 graduated from Southern Negro colleges. Du Bois concludes by stating that the "...inevitable problems of civilization the Negro must meet and solve largely for himself."

The function of the Negro college, then, is clear: it must maintain the standards of popular education, it must seek the social regeneration of the Negro, and it must help in the solution of problems of race contact and co-operation. And finally, beyond all this, it must develop men.

=== "Of the Black Belt" ===
Du Bois calls Albany, Georgia, in Dougherty County, the "heart of the Black Belt." He says: "Here are the remnants of the vast plantations."

How curious a land is this,—how full of untold story, of tragedy and laughter, and the rich legacy of human life; shadowed with a tragic past, and big with future promise!

Yet, he notes, it is not far from "where Sam Hose was crucified" [in a lynching], "to-day the centre of the Negro problem,—the centre of those nine million men who are America's dark heritage from slavery and the slave-trade." He continues: "Careless ignorance and laziness here, fierce hate and vindictiveness there,—these are the extremes of the Negro problem which we met that day, and we scarce knew which we preferred."

=== "Of the Quest of the Golden Fleece" ===
Speaking of the cotton fields from "Carolina to Texas", Du Bois claims an analogy between the "ancient and modern "Quest of the Golden Fleece in the Black Sea." Continuing his discussion of Dougherty County, he explains that of the 1500 Negro families around Albany in 1898, many families have 8–10 individuals in one- or two-room homes. These families are plagued with "easy marriage and easy separation," a vestige of slavery, which the Negro church has done much to prevent "a broken household." He claims that most of the black population is "poor and ignorant," more than 80 percent, though "fairly honest and well meaning." "Two-thirds of them cannot read or write," and "over eighty-eight percent of them—men, women and children—are farmers."

Economically, the Negro has become a slave of debt, says Du Bois. He describes the economic classes: the "submerged tenth" of croppers, 40 percent are metayers or "tenant on shares" with a chattel mortgage, 39 percent are semi-metayers and wage-laborers, while 5 percent are money-renters, and 6 percent freeholders. Finally, du Bois states that only 6 percent "have succeeded in emerging into peasant proprietorship", leading to a "migration to town", the "buying of small homesteads near town."

=== "Of the Sons of Master and Man" ===
This chapter discusses "race-contact," specifically as it relates to physical proximity, economic and political relations, intellectual contact, social contact, and religious enterprise. As for physical proximity, Du Bois states there is an obvious "physical color-line" in Southern communities separating whites from Negroes, and a Black Belt in larger areas of the country.

He says that here is a need for "Negro leaders of character and intelligence" to help guide Negro communities along the path out of the current economic situation. The power of the ballot is necessary, he asserts, as "in every state the best arbiters of their own welfare are the persons directly affected." He says that "the police system of the South was primarily designed to control slaves," and Negroes viewed its "courts as a means of reenslaving the blacks." Regarding social contact, Du Bois states "there is almost no community of intellectual life or point of transference where the thoughts and feelings of one race can come into direct contact and sympathy with thoughts and feelings of the other."

He concludes that "the future of the South depends on the ability of the representatives of these opposing views to see and appreciate and sympathize with each other's position."

=== "Of the Faith of the Fathers" ===
In Chapter X, Du Bois describes the rise of the black church and examines the history and contemporary state of religion and spiritualism among African Americans.

After recounting his first exposure to the Southern Negro revival, Du Bois notes three things that characterize this religion: "the Preacher, the Music, and the Frenzy" with the last meaning: "the Frenzy or "Shouting," when the Spirit of the Lord passed by, and, seizing the devotee, made him mad with supernatural joy." Du Bois says that the Negro church is the social center of Negro life and that Negro churches were predominately Methodist or Baptist after Emancipation. When Emancipation finally came, Du Bois states, "it seemed to the freedman a literal Coming of the Lord."

=== "Of the Passing of the First-Born" ===
The final chapters of the book are devoted to narratives of individuals. In Chapter XI, "Of the Passing of the First-Born", Du Bois recounts the birth of his first child, a son, and his untimely death as an infant. His son, Burghardt, contracted diphtheria and white doctors in Atlanta refused to treat black patients.

Du Bois comments, "Why was his hair tinted with gold? An evil omen was golden hair in my life." He says, "I saw his breath beat quicker and quicker, pause, and then his little soul leapt like a star that travels in the night and left a world of darkness in its train."

Du Bois ends with, "Sleep, then, child,—sleep till I sleep and waken to a baby voice and the ceaseless patter of little feet—above the Veil."

=== "Of Alexander Crummell" ===
In this chapter, Du Bois recounts a short biography of Alexander Crummell, an early black priest in the Episcopal Church.

Du Bois starts with, "this is the history of a human heart." He notes that Crummell faced three temptations: those of "Hate," "Despair," and "Doubt," while crossing two vales, "the Valley of Humiliation and the Valley of the Shadow of Death."

Du Bois ends with, "and now that he is gone, I sweep the Veil away and cry, Lo! the soul to whose dear memory I bring this little tribute."

=== "Of the Coming of John" ===
The penultimate chapter of The Souls of Black Folk, "Of the Coming of John", "reads like a short story, [but] Du Bois clearly considered it an essay." (See footnote to this essay in The Best American Essays of the Century, edited by Joyce Carol Oates; Houghton Mifflin Company, 2000).

The chapter describes two young men, both named John, one Black (John Jones) and the other white (John Henderson, the son of the wealthy and powerful Judge Henderson). Both Johns grow up in Altamaha, Georgia, where they were playmates in their youth. Both leave to go off to college, and both the white and Black communities in Altamaha anticipate their returns, saying: "When John comes."

The story describes John Jones's time at college and his time in the north before returning home, including crossing paths with John Henderson at a performance of the opera Lohengrin in New York City, where John Henderson requests an usher to remove John Jones from the audience.

When John Jones returns to his hometown, transformed by his time away, now a serious man with a deep understanding of the world, including the injustice of racism and of Jim Crow, he finds himself at odds with both Black and white. He speaks at his church, but what he says falls flat: "[l]ittle had they understood of what he said, for he spoke an unknown tongue." He convinces Judge Henderson to let him become a teacher at the Black school, and is warned to keep his place and to not stir up trouble. The Judge makes his opinions clear: "in this country the Negro must remain subordinate, and can never expect to be the equal of white men. In their place, your people can be honest and respectful; and God knows, I'll do what I can to help them. But when they want to reverse nature, and rule white men, and marry white women, and sit in my parlor, then, by God! we'll hold them under if we have to lynch every N-- in the land."

John Jones says he accepts the situation and is allowed to teach. It's hard work, but he makes some headway. Some time passes. One day, word gets back to the Judge that John Jones is "livenin' things up at the darky school." While Judge Henderson storms off to shut down the school, his son, John Henderson, grows bored and leaves his home and finds John Jones's sister. She is young and beautiful, and John Henderson is bored. He demands a kiss; she runs. He pursues her. John Jones, walking home from the school, which Judge Henderson has just closed, comes upon John Henderson accosting his sister. John Jones picks up a branch and defends his sister, killing John Henderson.

In the final paragraphs, a lynch mob on horseback approaches with the Judge in front, for whom John Jones is filled with pity. Knowing what is ahead, John Jones "softly hum[s] the 'Song of the Bride'" in German.

=== "The Sorrow Songs" ===
Chapter XIV, "The Sorrow songs", is about Negro music. He refers to the short musical passages at the beginning of each of the other chapters. Du Bois mentions that the music was so powerful and meaningful that, regardless of the people's appearance and teaching, "their hearts were human and their singing stirred men with a mighty power." Du Bois concludes the chapter by bringing up inequality, race and discrimination. He says, "Your country? How came it yours? Before the Pilgrims landed we were here".

Du Bois heralds the "melody of the slave songs," or the Negro spirituals, as the "articulate message of the slave to the world." They are the music, he contends, not of the joyous black slave, as a good many whites had misread them, but "of an unhappy people, of the children of disappointment; they tell of death and suffering and unvoiced longing toward a truer world, of misty wanderings and hidden ways." For Du Bois, the sorrow songs represented a black folk culture—with its origins in slavery—unadulterated by the civilizing impulses of a northern black church, increasingly obsessed with respectability and with Western aesthetic criteria. Rather than vestiges of a backward time that should be purged from black repertoires and isolated from what Alain Locke called the "modernization of the negro" (coincident, for Locke, with urbanization), negro spirituals are—for Du Bois—where the souls of black folk past and present are found.

Du Bois passionately advocated for the preservation of the spiritual, along with Antonín Dvořák and contemporary black aestheticians, including Harry Burleigh, Robert Nathaniel Dett, Alain Locke and Zora Neale Hurston. It is in the retrieval of black cultural folkways—particularly "The Sorrow Songs"—that one of the major complications of Du Bois's project and, later, the Harlem Renaissance (where Hurston and Locke debut their own retrievals) surfaces. For Du Bois's contention that the sorrow songs contain a notative excess, and untranscribable element Yolanda Pierce identifies as the "soul" of the sorrow songs. The mappings of sound and signs that make up the languages of white Western culture would prove insufficient to many black literary critics of the 1920s and beyond, and the debates over the abilities to retrieve and preserve black folkways find their roots in Du Bois's treatment of the sorrow songs and in his call for their rescue.

== Critical reception ==
In Living Black History, Du Bois's biographer Manning Marable observes:

Few books make history and fewer still become foundational texts for the movements and struggles of an entire people. The Souls of Black Folk occupies this rare position. It helped to create the intellectual argument for the black freedom struggle in the twentieth century. "Souls" justified the pursuit of higher education for Negroes and thus contributed to the rise of the black middle class. By describing a global color-line, Du Bois anticipated pan-Africanism and colonial revolutions in the Third World. Moreover, this stunning critique of how 'race' is lived through the normal aspects of daily life is central to what would become known as 'whiteness studies' a century later.

At the time of its publication, the Nashville Banner warned of The Souls of Black Folk, "This book is dangerous for the Negro to read, for it will only incite discontent and fill his imagination with things that do not exist, or things that should not bear upon his mind." The New York Times said, "A review of [the work of the Freedmen's Bureau] from the negro point of view, even the Northern negro's point of view, must have its value to any unprejudiced student—still more, perhaps, for the prejudiced who is yet willing to be a student."

In his introduction to the 1961 edition, writer Saunders Redding observed: "The boycott of the buses in Montgomery had many roots . . . but none more important than this little book of essays published more than half a century ago."

=== Literary reception ===
As Yale professor Hazel Carby points out, for black writers before the abolition of slavery in 1865, it was impossible "even to imagine the option of returning to the South once black humanity and freedom had been gained in the North", and it was rarely found in later literature as well. While the narratives of Frederick Douglass and Harriet Ann Jacobs move towards the North and freedom, Du Bois reverses "the direction of the archetypal journey of these original narratives" and focuses on the Black Belt of the South. Although the text "consistently shifts between a predominantly white and a predominantly black world", in line with Du Bois's concept of double consciousness, "its overall narrative impulse gradually moves the focus from a white terrain to an autonomous black one."

Carby traces the ways in which Du Bois gendered his narrative of black folk, but also how Du Bois's conceptual framework is gendered as well. According to Carby, it seems that Du Bois in this book is most concerned with how race and nation intersect, and how such an intersection is based on particular masculine notions of progress. According to Carby, Du Bois "exposes and exploits the tension that exists between the internal egalitarianism of the nation and the relations of domination and subordination embodied in a racially encoded social hierarchy." So Du Bois makes a conceptual argument that racialization is actually compatible with the nation in so far as it creates unified races. However, this unified race is only possible through the gendered narrative that he constructs throughout Souls, which renders black male intellectuals (himself) as the (only possible) leader(s) of the unified race. Carby explains that "in order to retain his credentials for leadership, Du Bois had to situate himself as both an exceptional and a representative individual.... The terms and conditions of his exceptionalism, Du Bois argues, have their source in his formation as a gendered intellectual." According to Carby, Du Bois was concerned with "the reproduction of Race Men". In other words, "the figure of the intellectual and race leader is born of and engendered by other males."

Such a reading of Du Bois calls attention to "queer meanings" that, according to Charles Nero, are inherent in Souls. Nero, who uses Anne Herrmann's definition of queer, conceptualizes queerness as the "recognition on the part of others that one is not like others, a subject out of order, not in sequence, not working." Foundational to Nero's argument is the understanding that men have the authority to exchange women among one another in order to form a "homosocial contract". Nero analyzes Du Bois's discussion on the Teutonic and Submissive Man to conclude that such a contract would lead to a "round and full development" to produce a "great civilization". However, Nero is concerned with violence and the "rigid policing of sexual identity categories at the turn of the century", which ultimately made such a homosocial, biracial contract impossible.

In Charles I. Nero's "Queering the Souls of Black Folk", Nero marks "Of the Coming of John" as a central chapter that demonstrates his queer reading of Souls. Nero argues that John Jones's absence of masculinity is a sign of his queerness and that the killing of his "double" represents Du Bois's disillusionment with the idea that a biracial and homosocial society can exist. Nero contends that Du Bois's illustration of the gulf between the two Johns is complicated by the impossibility of biracial male union, which suggests that John's acculturation in the metropole (Johnstown in Du Bois's narrative)—alongside lessons in Victorian comportment and a "queer" intellectualism—is also an ideological induction into male sexual panic, or the hegemony of a racializing gender order at the turn of the twentieth century. Nero's interpretation of Jennie's assault (and her subsequent disappearance from the text) chafes against earlier interpretations that allege John Jones's murder of John Henderson as indebted to a tradition of white southern chivalry. Instead, Nero marshals Signithia Fordham's terminology of "gender integrity" to delimit how the murder of John Henderson resolves the challenge to John Jones's masculinity, going on to point out that "Du Bois [is] writing about race… [and] against a culture that turns him queer by excluding him from public heterosexuality" (Nero 271).

=== Cultural and religious criticism ===
Du Bois had transdisciplinary training and he provided a historical context for black religion and culture. His concept of "double-consciousness" and other concepts from Souls have been highly influential on other scholars in their interpretations of black culture and religion. Cheryl Sanders, a professor of Christian ethics at Howard University School of Divinity, lists a "who's who" of Du Bois progeny in her scholarly work, including Paul Gilroy, C. Eric Lincoln, Lawrence Mamiya, Peter Paris, Emilie Townes, and Cornel West. These are some of the scholars who take up themes or concepts found in Souls for their own work in religious and theological studies or cultural criticism. Additionally, Victor Anderson, a philosophical theologian and cultural critic at Vanderbilt University Divinity School and the author of Beyond Ontological Blackness: An Essay on African American Religious and Cultural Criticism, links concepts from Souls to much of the work in black religious studies.

In Beyond Ontological Blackness, Victor Anderson seeks to critique a trope of "black heroic genius" articulated within the logics of ontological blackness as a philosophy of racial consciousness. At the center of this conception is Du Bois.

Anderson says,

W. E. B. Du Bois's double-consciousness depiction of black existence has come to epitomize the existential determinants of black self-consciousness. These alienated forms of black consciousness have been categorically defined in African-American cultural studies as: The Negro Problem, The Color Line, Black Experience, Black Power, The Veil of Blackness, Black Radicalism, and most recently, The Black Sacred Cosmos.

Anderson's critique of black heroic genius and a move towards black cultural fulfillment is an attempt to move beyond the categories deployed by Du Bois in Souls.

Similarly, Sanders critiques Du Bois's concept of double-consciousness, especially in terms of interpreting black holiness-Pentecostalism. In Sanders's work, Saints in Exile: The Holiness-Pentecostal Experience in African American Religion and Culture, Sanders deploys a dialectical understanding of exile, which she characterizes in black holiness-Pentecostal terms as "Being in the world, but not of it." At the same time, Sanders wishes to contrast this to the double-consciousness dialect of Du Bois, at least as she understands it. For Sanders, "exilic dialectics" is "hoped to represent a progressive step beyond the 'double-consciousness' described by W. E. B. Du Bois in 1903, which persists as the dominant paradigm in African American religious and cultural thought."

Describing exilic consciousness as between "both-and", and double-consciousness as "either-or", Sanders says that those who live in exile "can find equilibrium and fulfillment between extremes, whereas adherents to the latter either demand resolution or suffer greatly in the tension, as is the case with Du Bois's description of the agony of 'double-consciousness,' as 'two warring ideals in one dark body, whose dogged strength alone keeps it from being torn asunder.'"

=== International reception ===
The Souls of Black Folk had significant influence in China. The Chinese translation was based on the 1953 Blue Heron edition, which had removed arguably anti-Semitic references from the original text. People's Daily praised the book extensively, although it also had some mild criticism, and recommended that Chinese read it to understand how racial discrimination has oppressed Black Americans.

Du Bois' account of the loss of his son was particularly well-regarded in China and was published as a separate pamphlet by Commercial Press the year after the book as a whole was published in Chinese.

== Textual changes ==
In 1953, The Souls of Black Folk was published in a special "Fiftieth Anniversary Jubilee Edition". In his introduction, Du Bois wrote that in the 50 years since its publication, he occasionally had the inclination to revise the book but ultimately decided to leave it as it was, "as a monument to what I thought and felt in 1903". While he stuck by his decision, he wrote that in the new edition he had made "less than a half-dozen alterations in word or phrase and then not to change my thoughts as previously set down but to avoid any possible misunderstanding today of what I meant to say yesterday."

In 1973, historian Herbert Aptheker identified seven changes between the editions. Historian and literary critic Henry Louis Gates Jr. and a team of readers performed a line-by-line comparison of the two editions during the 1980s and identified two more changes. All the changes are minor; the longest was to change "nephews and poor whites and the Jews" to "poor relations and foreign immigrants". In six of the nine changes, Du Bois changed references to Jews to refer to immigrants or foreigners. Two of the other changes also involved references to Jews.

Du Bois wrote to Aptheker in February 1953 about concerns he had with his references to Jews in the book:

I have had a chance to read [The Souls of Black Folk] in part for the first time in years. I find in chapters VII, VIII and IX, five incidental references to Jews. I recall that years ago, Jacob Schiff wrote me criticising these references and that I denied any thought of race or religious prejudice and promised to go over the passages in future editions. These editions succeeded each other without any consultation with me, and evidently the matter slipped out of my mind.
As I re-read these words today, I see that harm might come if they were allowed to stand as they are. First of all, I am not at all sure that the foreign exploiters to whom I referred ... were in fact Jews.... But even if they were, what I was condemning was the exploitation and not the race nor religion. And I did not, when writing, realize that by stressing the name of the group instead of what some members of the [group] may have done, I was unjustly maligning a people in exactly the same way my folk were then and are now falsely accused.
In view of this and because of the even greater danger of injustice now than then, I want in the event of re-publication [to] change those passages.

In a March 1953 letter to Blue Heron Press, Du Bois asked that the following paragraph be added to the end of "Of the Black Belt":

In the foregoing chapter, "Jews" have been mentioned five times, and the late Jacob Schiff once complained that this gave an impression of anti-Semitism. This at the time I stoutly denied; but as I read the passages again in the light of subsequent history, I see how I laid myself open to this possible misapprehension. What, of course, I meant to condemn was the exploitation of black labor and that it was in this country and at that time in part a matter of immigrant Jews, was incidental and not essential. My inner sympathy with the Jewish people was expressed better in the last paragraph of page 152. But this illustrates how easily one slips into unconscious condemnation of a whole group.

The publisher did not add the paragraph, possibly because Du Bois changed the text instead.
