= Atlanta Exposition Speech =

1895 address by Booker T. Washington

Excerpt from the 1895 Atlanta Exposition Speech
The opening of Booker T. Washington's speech to the Cotton States and International Exposition, recorded in 1908.

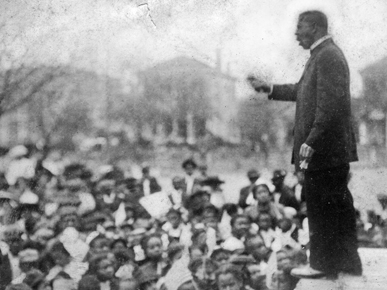
Booker T. Washington giving the speech on his proposal, later called the "Atlanta Compromise"

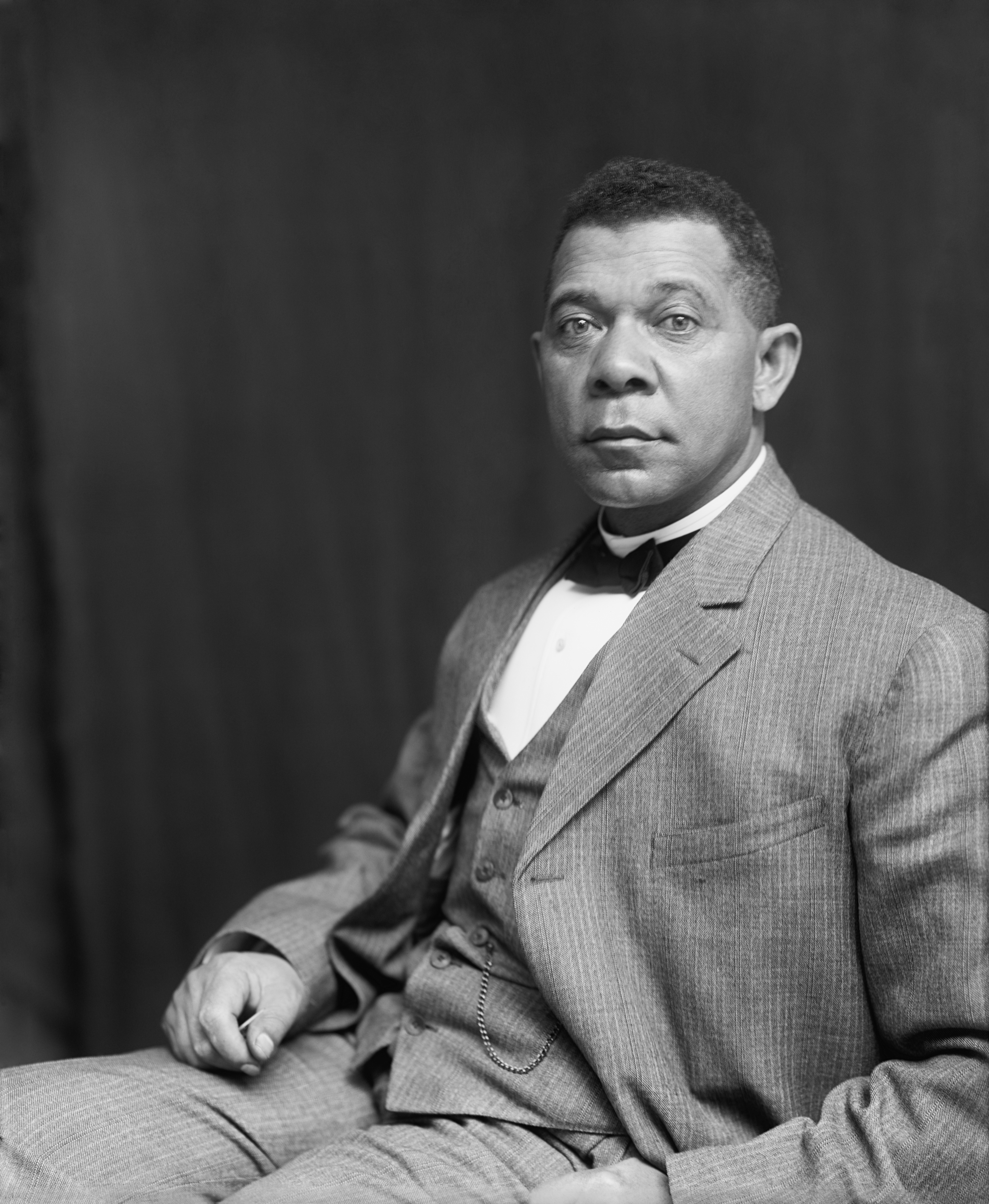
Photograph of Booker T. Washington by Frances Benjamin Johnston, c. 1895

The Atlanta Exposition Speech was an address on the topic of race relations given by African-American scholar Booker T. Washington on September 18, 1895. The speech outlined Washington's vision for cooperation between blacks and whites in the southern United States. Washington's proposal – later called the Atlanta Compromise – conceded there would be racial segregation and discrimination against black citizens in the white-ruled South, in exchange for which he called for civic peace and opportunities for black citizens to learn, work for a living, help the South develop, and thereby earn a measure of respect from white citizens.

The speech was presented before a predominantly white audience at the Cotton States and International Exposition (the site of today's Piedmont Park) in Atlanta, Georgia, has been recognized as one of the most important and influential speeches in American history. The speech was preceded by the reading of a dedicatory ode written by Frank Lebby Stanton.

Washington began with a call to the African-American population, who composed one third of the Southern United States, to join the world of work. He declared that the South was where black people were given their chance, as opposed to the North, especially in the worlds of commerce and industry. He told the white audience that rather than relying on the immigrant population arriving at the rate of a million people a year, they should hire some of the nation's eight million African-American population. He praised black peoples' loyalty, fidelity and love in service to the white population, but warned that they could be a great burden on society if oppression continued, stating that the progress of the South was inherently tied to the treatment of black people and protection of their liberties.

He addressed the inequality between commercial legality and social acceptance, proclaiming that "The opportunity to earn a dollar in a factory just now is worth infinitely more than the opportunity to spend a dollar in an opera house." Washington also promoted segregation by claiming that blacks and whites could exist as separate fingers of a hand.

The title "Atlanta Compromise Speech" was given to the speech by W. E. B. Du Bois, who believed it was insufficiently committed to the pursuit of social and political equality for African Americans.

Although the speech was not recorded at its initial presentation in 1895, Washington recorded a portion of the speech during a trip to New York in 1908. This recording has been included in the United States National Recording Registry.

== Major motifs and similes ==
=== Cast down your bucket where you are ===
Washington used this phrase several times in the speech. The phrase was originally a call for a doomed ship to "cast down your bucket" to the ocean, upon which the sailors discovered fresh water to drink from the nearby Amazon River mouth.

For Washington's audience, the phrase had different meanings for whites and blacks. For whites, Washington seemed to be challenging their common misperceptions of black labor. The North had been experiencing labor troubles in the early 1890s (Homestead Strike, Pullman Strike, etc.) and Washington sought to capitalize on these issues by offering Southern black labor as an alternative, especially since his Tuskegee Institute was in the business of training such workers. For blacks, however, the "bucket motif" represented a call to personal uplift and diligence, as the South needed them to rebuild following the Civil War.

=== Separate as the fingers, yet one as the hand ===
This phrase appeared at the end of the speech's fifth paragraph. It is commonly referred to as the "Hand simile." Certain historians, like Louis Harlan, saw this simile as Washington's personal embrace of racial segregation. The entire simile reads as follows:

In all things purely social we can be as separate as the fingers, yet one as the hand in all things essential to mutual progress.

Ultimately, many Southern whites (Porter King, William Yates Atkinson, etc.) praised Washington for including such a simile, because it effectively disarmed any immediate threat posed by blacks toward segregation (accommodationism).
