= W. E. B. Du Bois Memorial Centre for Pan African Culture =

Research facility and tourist attraction in Ghana

W. E. B. Du Bois Memorial Centre for Pan-African Culture is a memorial place, a research facility and tourist attraction in the Cantonments area of Accra, Ghana, that was opened to the public in 1985. It is named in dedication to W. E. B. Du Bois, an African-American historian and pan-Africanist who became a citizen of Ghana in the early 1960s. He lived there in his last few years at the invitation of President Kwame Nkrumah, while compiling the Encyclopedia Africana. In 2023 the Ghanaian government announced a long-term agreement with the W. E. B. Du Bois Museum Foundation to restore, rebuild, and expand the facility into a major Pan-African historical, educational, and cultural complex.

== History ==
The Du Bois Centre is located at No. 22 First Circular Road, in Cantonments, Accra, Ghana, the former residence of W. E. B. Du Bois. He died there on 27 August 1963. It was opened to the public on 22 June 1985 and was named a national memorial in November that year.

The Centre houses a small museum with part of Du Bois's personal library and a collection of his works, which are made available to researchers. An adjacent shrine shelters his grave and the ashes of his second wife, Shirley Graham Du Bois.

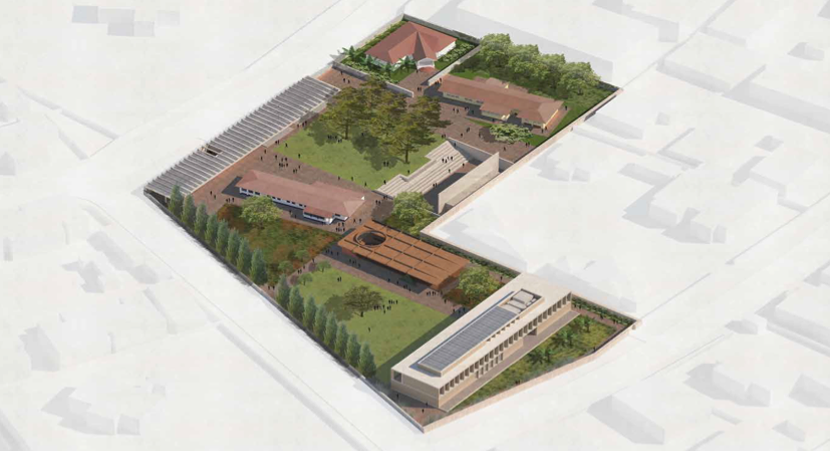
Rendering of proposed W. E. B. Du Bois Museum Complex

In 2023 the government of Ghana signed a Memorandum of Understanding with the W.E.B Du Bois Museum Foundation to develop, rebrand, operate and manage the Centre into a major new educational complex to preserve and continue Du Bois' legacy. In 2024, the Mellon Foundation announced a US $5 million grant to provide leadership funds for four years in Phase 1 of the new complex's development.
