= Yolande Du Bois =

American teacher (1900–1961)

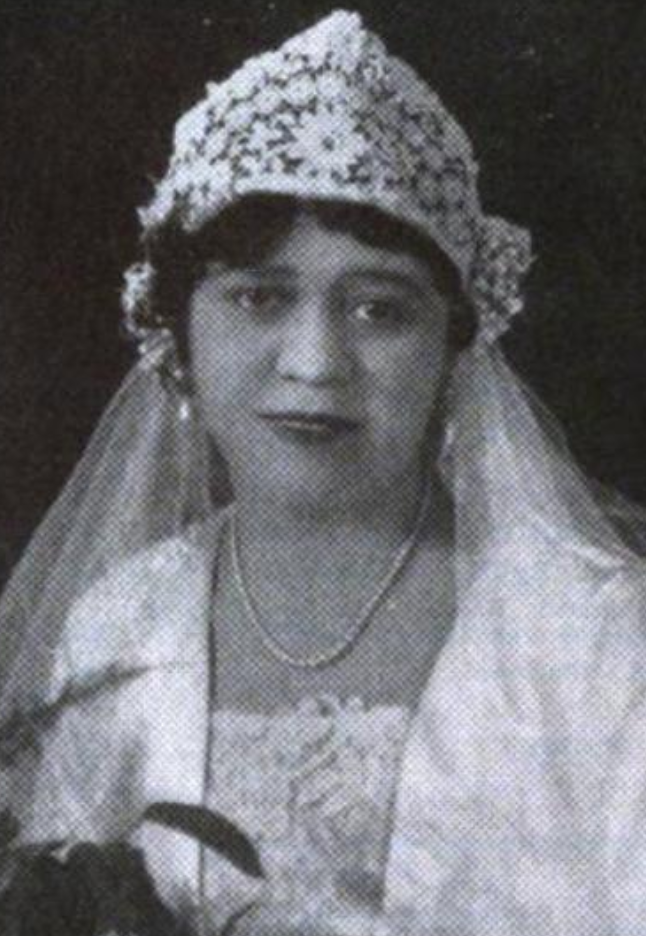
- Du Bois Cullen in her wedding ensemble, from a 1928 publication
- Born: October 21, 1900; Great Barrington, Massachusetts, U.S.
- Died: March 1961 (aged 60); Baltimore, Maryland
- Occupation: Educator
- Spouse(s): Countee Cullen (divorced); Arnette Franklin Williams (divorced)
- Children: 1
- Parent(s): W. E. B. Du Bois; Nina Gomer
- Relatives: Mary Silvina Burghardt Du Bois (grandmother)

Nina Yolande Du Bois (October 21, 1900 – March 1961) was an American teacher known for her involvement in the Harlem Renaissance. She was the daughter of W.E.B. Du Bois and the former Nina Gomer. Her father encouraged her marriage to Countee Cullen, a nationally known poet of the Harlem Renaissance. They divorced within two years. She married again and had a daughter, Du Bois's only grandchild. That marriage also ended in divorce.

Du Bois graduated from Fisk University and later earned an MA from Columbia University. She worked as a teacher, primarily in Baltimore, Maryland.

== Early life ==
Du Bois was born on October 21, 1900, in Great Barrington, Massachusetts, her father's hometown, to William Edward Burghardt and Nina (née Gomer) Du Bois. They had arrived there from Atlanta, Georgia, shortly after the death of their infant son Burghardt from diphtheria in 1899. When Yolande was growing up, she did not have a close relationship with her father. He was often away for his career, or living in a different city altogether for academic research and assignments. Yolande was often ill. A family physician diagnosed the girl as having "inadequate levels of lime" when she had poor health. Some biographers thought that Yolande faked these illnesses to gain her father's attention. As a child, Yolande was defiant toward her parents. She was aggressive and passionate in nature. Her father described their relationship as one in which she held the power. To gain some control, her parents sent her to Bedales, a British boarding school. While dealing with racial discrimination, she graduated from Brooklyn's Girls' High School.

Du Bois began attending Fisk University in 1920. In her sophomore year she fell ill, and spent the entire month of February in the hospital due to serious inflammation of the gums. While in college, Yolande was in a loving romance with jazz musician Jimmie Lunceford. However, her father believed he was an unsuitable match. Defying her parents' wishes, she continued to see Lunceford for some time. The relationship ended when she conceded to her father's wish that she marry poet Countee Cullen, who had received early acclaim in his career.

She graduated from Fisk and started teaching in Baltimore, Maryland at a public high school.

== Marriage and family ==
Du Bois first met Countee Cullen in 1923, when they were both students in college, she at Fisk and he at New York University (NYU). She married him on April 9, 1928, at Salem Methodist Episcopal Church in Harlem, in a wedding officiated by his adoptive father, Frederick A. Cullen, a minister. Countee’s close friend, Harold Jackman, had introduced the pair to each other, likely at the Jersey Shore where Countee's parents had a house in Pleasantville. With the approval of Yolande's father, Countee proposed during the holiday season of 1927.

He and her father spent the next couple of months planning the wedding with little contribution from Yolande. The April 9th wedding became the social event of the year, a highlight among the black elite. The public African-American press published every detail of the wedding, including the rail car used and the number of people in the wedding party. Du Bois pressured Countee to pick up the marriage certificate early to prevent any problems or delays; he acquired it four days before the ceremony. Some 1,200 people from Du Bois' wide political and activist circle were invited to the wedding, but 3,000 people crowded into the church for the ceremony. Yolande had 16 bridesmaids and Cullen had 9 groomsmen. Jackman served as the best man.

After the wedding Yolande and Countee visited Philadelphia, Atlantic City, New Jersey, and Great Barrington, Massachusetts in a brief honeymoon. During the honeymoon, Yolande wrote to her father, saying that she was unsure about her marriage and her intimate relationship with her husband. Her father responded that she simply needed more experience. In June 1928 Countee, his father and Jackman traveled together to Paris, as Countee had received a Guggenheim Fellowship for study in Europe. Yolande joined him in August. By September 1928, her father was counseling Cullen on maintaining the marriage. After Cullen admitted to Yolande that he was attracted to men, she filed for divorce. Like the wedding, the divorce was negotiated between Cullen and Yolande's father; it became final in Paris in the spring of 1930. (Countee married again in 1940 and stayed married until his death several years later.)

== Later adulthood ==
Yolande fell ill and moved back to Baltimore. She entered the American Hospital, where she was treated for an undisclosed illness. After she was well, she returned to her teaching position. She took a job at Dunbar High School, teaching both English and history.

While teaching, she met Arnette Franklin Williams, who had begun attending a night school held at Dunbar. Du Bois and Williams married in September 1931. Their daughter Du Bois Williams was born October 11, 1932. The family informally called her "Baby Du Bois." Soon after her birth, Williams moved to Pennsylvania for his football career and abandoned Yolande and his daughter.

Du Bois and her mother moved to New York City, where she began taking classes at Columbia University’s Teachers College. She earned a master's degree from Columbia and returned to teaching in Baltimore. Her divorce from Williams was final in 1936.

== Career as teacher and later life ==
Yolande Du Bois Williams returned to Baltimore, where she worked as a teacher and reared her daughter. Her mother died in 1950. Her father remarried about a year later.

Yolande's daughter, Du Bois Williams, who married Arthur Edward McFarlane, Sr., had the first male born in the Du Bois family since Burghardt in 1897 (that child had died tragically at 18 months of age and was the topic of a chapter in W.E.B. Du Bois' most famous book, The Souls of Black Folk). Arthur Edward McFarlane, II, was born December 25, 1957, to W.E.B. Du Bois' great delight. At Du Bois' 90th birthday party in New York City, his speech was addressed to his great-grandson, Arthur. Yolande, her daughter, Du Bois, her husband, and their son all attended.

Yolande Du Bois Williams died in Baltimore of a heart attack in March 1961. Yolande was buried in the Mahaiwe Cemetery at Great Barrington, Massachusetts, her father's hometown, beside her mother, Nina Du Bois, and brother Burghardt, who had died as an infant. Williams' grandson, Arthur E. McFarlane II, arranged to install a headstone at her grave in Great Barrington in 2014. That year was also the occasion of dedication of a new interpretive trail at the W.E.B. Du Bois Boyhood Homesite, a National Historic Landmark in the city.

After Yolande's death, her father accepted an invitation from Kwame Nkrumah to go to Ghana, where he worked on his proposed Encyclopedia Africana. He was unable to complete it before his death there in 1963. He was buried in Ghana. His second wife, the writer and activist Shirley Graham Du Bois, was also buried there, years later.

Yolande Du Bois Williams, W. E. B. Du Bois' only granddaughter, married Howard Irvin and became known as Yolande Du Bois Irvin. She attended Fisk University and then New York University to get her bachelor's degree, and earned a Ph.D. in psychology at the University of Colorado. She joined the psychology faculty of Xavier University of Louisiana in 1988 and taught there until her retirement. She died on November 15, 2021, at age 89 and was survived by three of her four children and their descendants. She was buried in Great Barrington alongside her mother and other Du Bois family members.
