= Darkwater: Voices from Within the Veil =

1920 book by W. E. B. Du Bois

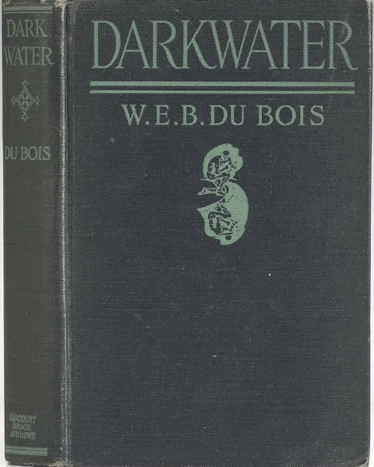
- Cover of first edition
- Author: W. E. B. Du Bois
- Language: English
- Series: Series of autobiographies
- Genre: Autobiography
- Publisher: Harcourt, Brace and Howe
- Publication date: 1920
- Publication place: New York, USA
- Media type: Print (Hardcover)
- Pages: 276
- Followed by: Dusk of Dawn: An Autobiography of a Race Concept

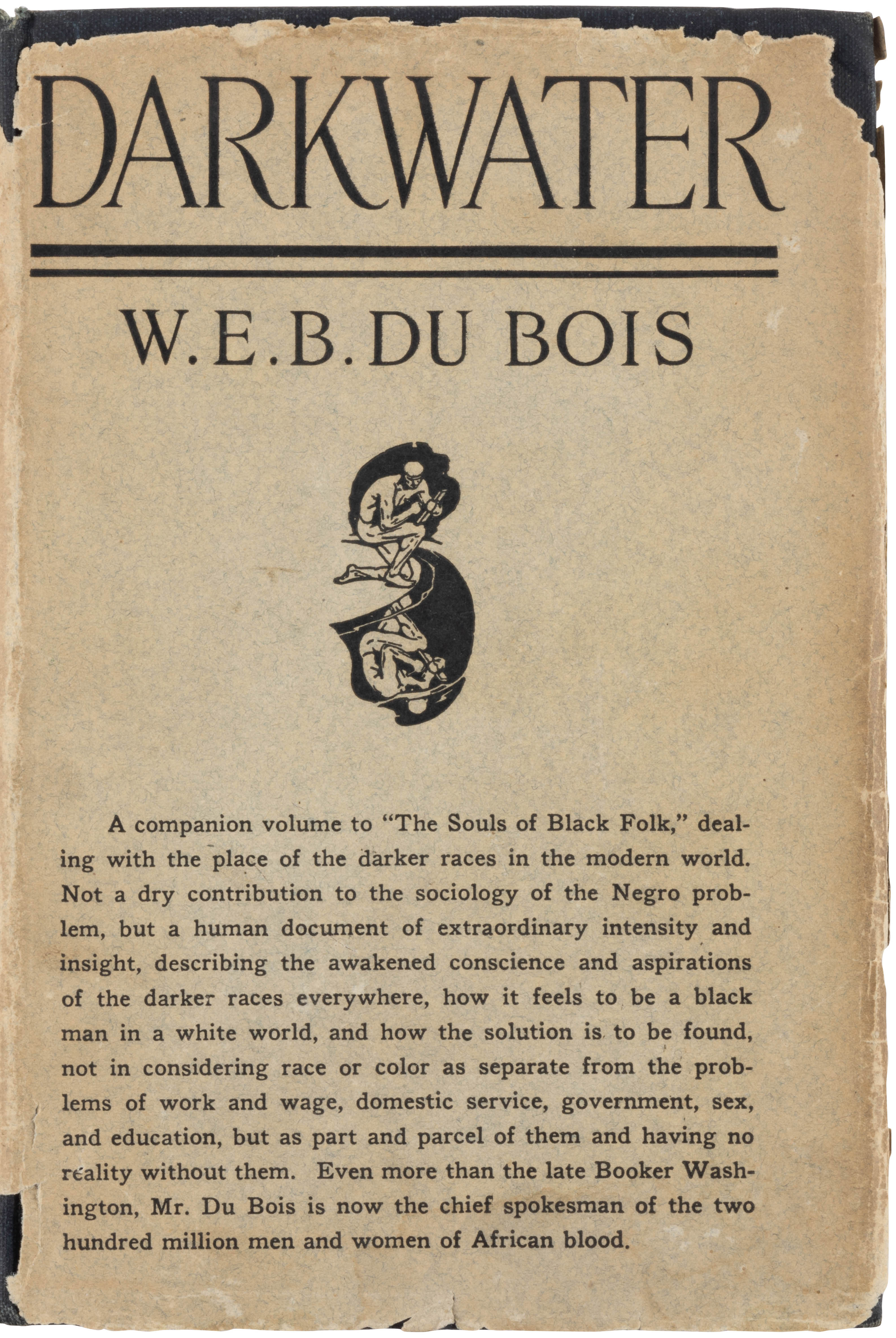
First edition (publ. Harcourt Brace)

Darkwater: Voices from Within the Veil is a literary work by W. E. B. Du Bois. Published in 1920, the text incorporates autobiographical information as well as essays, spirituals, and poems that were all written by Du Bois himself.

== Writing ==
Written when he was 50, Darkwater is the first of Du Bois's three autobiographies and was followed by Dusk of Dawn: An Autobiography of a Race Concept, and The Autobiography of W. E. B. Du Bois: A Soliloquy on Viewing My Life from the Last Decade of its First Century.

Du Bois maintained that the book was written to develop an understanding of the complications of the color-line with emphasis on its political implications.

“I venture to write again on themes on which great souls have already said greater words, in the hope that I may strike here and there a half-tone, newer even if slighter, up from the heart of my problem and the problems of my people.”

== Contents ==
An overarching theme of this work is the unifying character of labor, and its contrast with traditional conflict between historical identities. Usually this is cast in terms of conflict between white and black workers, but with some variation. For example:

Our great ethical question today is, therefore, how may we justly distribute the world's goods to satisfy the necessary wants of the mass of men.

What hinders the answer to this question? Dislikes, jealousies, hatreds, -- undoubtedly like the race hatred in East St. Louis; the jealousy of English and German; the dislike of the Jew and the Gentile. But these are, after all, surface disturbances, sprung from ancient habit more than from present reason. They persist and are encouraged because of deeper, mightier currents. If the white workingmen of East St. Louis felt sure that Negro workers would not and could not take the bread and cake from their mouths, their race hatred would never have been translated into murder. If the black workingmen of the South could earn a decent living under decent circumstances at home, they would not be compelled to underbid their white fellows.

Thus the shadow of hunger, in a world which never needs to be hungry, drives us to war and murder and hate. But why does hunger shadow so vast a mass of men? Manifestly because in the great organizing of men for work a few of the participants come out with more wealth than they can possibly use, while a vast number emerge with less than can decently support life. In earlier economic stages...

Several of its essays are personal in nature, with obvious emotional rhetoric. The style maintains a religious tone and his spirituality is a common thread in many of the individual essays. Described in varying tones of black and brown, a Christ-like figure of racial hope is prevalent, signifying the coming moment of racial confrontation and eventual salvation. This figure is one which Du Bois characterizes as the bearer of eternal freedom from discrimination, poverty, and from the color line itself. The stories within Darkwater also revolve around discontent with the way that democracy was viewed and handled among people of different ethnic, racial, and social groups.

The chapter structure of Darkwater follows a consistent pattern of a narrative section and a poetic section, both within one chapter. The narrative sections are frequently autobiographical or are otherwise works of speculative fiction. In this text Du Bois compiles previously written works from The Atlantic, The Independent, The Crisis, and the Journal of Race Development.

In his chapter called "The Damnation of Women," Du Bois seeks to elevate women by acknowledging their labor in the home, the workplace and the black church. The chapter has been described as one of the first proto-feminist analyses by a male intellectual. In the chapter, Du Bois gives the black mother even more glorification for her role as child bearer. He calls for women to seek a life of economic independence, and argues that women have a right to control their own bodies and reproductive choices. Yet in his description of women he often describes their physical traits first such as his description of journalist Mary Shadd Cary whom Du Bois described as a "ravishing dream-born beauty."

== Credo ==
Darkwater opens with "Credo", which was frequently reprinted in contexts other than within the book. It was written in style similar to a Christian creed and was his statement of faith and vision for change. "Credo" was widely read and recited.

It begins with the prophetic statement

I believe in God who made of one blood all races that dwell on earth. I believe that all men, black and brown and white, are brothers, varying, through Time and Opportunity, in form and gift and feature, but differing in no essential particular, and alike in soul and in the possibility of infinite development.

and later speaks to freedom and dreams

I believe in Liberty for all men; the space to stretch their arms and their souls; the right to breathe and the right to vote, the freedom to choose their friends, enjoy the sunshine and ride on the railroads, uncursed by color; thinking, dreaming, working as they will in a kingdom of God and love.

== Reception ==
Darkwater: Voices From Within the Veil was well received by audiences after it was first published, helping to open the eyes of readers to the problems of racial discrimination in America. In his review of Darkwater in the popular magazine The Survey, Robert Foerster writes: "Actually it is a book so skillfully put together, so passionately felt, so lyrically expressed, that it will be read widely."
