= Nina Gomer Du Bois =

American civil rights activist (1870–1950)

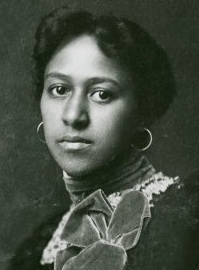
- Du Bois c. 1901
- Born: Nina Gomer; July 4, 1870; Quincy, Illinois, U.S.
- Died: July 26, 1950 (aged 80); Baltimore, Maryland, U.S.
- Resting place: Mahaiwe Cemetery
- Education: Wilberforce University
- Occupations: Activist homemaker
- Spouse: W. E. B. Du Bois (m. 1896)
- Children: 2 (including Yolande Du Bois)

Nina Gomer Du Bois (July 4, 1870 – July 26, 1950) was an American civil rights activist, Baháʼí Faith practitioner, and homemaker. In 1927, she served on the executive committee of the Women's International Circle of Peace and Foreign Relations, which was largely responsible for organizing the Fourth Pan-African Congress in New York. Du Bois was the first wife of civil rights activist W. E. B. Du Bois and the mother of educator Yolande Du Bois.

== Early life and education ==
Du Bois was born on July 4, 1870, to Charles S. Gomer and Mary J. Schneider Gomer in Quincy, Illinois, United States. When she was six years old, her family moved to Cedar Rapids, Iowa, where her father was employed as a cook at Brown's Hotel. Following her father's promotion to head cook of the hotel, he purchased a small house for the family in 1878.

She attended Wilberforce University.

== Later life ==
She married the activist W. E. B. Du Bois, who had been a teacher at Wilberforce University, on May 12, 1896, at her father's home in Cedar Rapids. They had two children: a son, Burghardt, who died in infancy, and a daughter, Yolande. She lived in Baltimore with her daughter until her daughter's divorce, at which time the two moved to the family's Dunbar Apartment in New York City.

She was involved in her husband's civil rights work and described as a civil rights activist, but mostly stayed home to raise their daughter. She served on the executive committee of the Women's International Circle of Peace and Foreign Relations in 1927, alongside Minta Bosley Allen Trotman and Addie Waites Hunton. The committee was largely responsible for organizing the fourth Pan-African Congress in New York.

In 1936, Du Bois converted from Christianity to the Baháʼí Faith. She was active in the Baháʼí community.

By 1946, she and her family were living in Morgan Park, Maryland.

Du Bois died on July 26, 1950. She was buried in Mahaiwe Cemetery in Great Barrington, Massachusetts.
