= The Negro =

Book by W. E. B. Du Bois

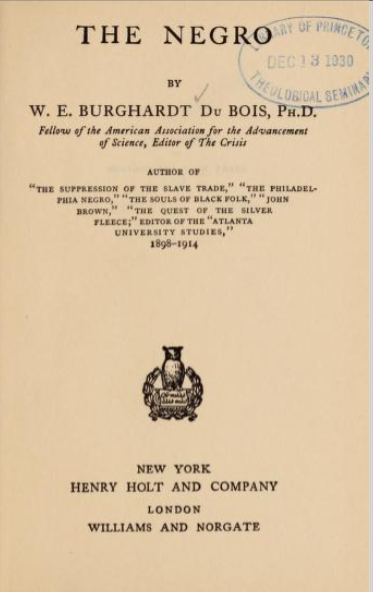
- Author: W. E. B. Du Bois
- Publication date: 1915

The Negro is a book by W. E. B. Du Bois published in 1915 and released in electronic form by Project Gutenberg in 2011. It is an overview of African-American history, tracing it as far back as the sub-Saharan cultures, including Great Zimbabwe, Ghana and Songhai, as well as covering the history of the slave trade and the history of Africans in the United States and the Caribbean.

Historians John Parker and Richard Rathbone call the book the "first serious attempt at a continent-wide history [of Africa]".

== See also ==
- Negro
