= Dusk of Dawn =

1940 autobiographical text by W. E. B. Du Bois

Dusk of Dawn: An Essay Toward an Autobiography of a Race Concept
- First edition
- Author: W. E. B. Du Bois
- Language: English
- Subject: Race, Race in the United States
- Genre: Autobiography
- Publisher: Harcourt Brace
- Publication date: 1940
- Publication place: United States
- ISBN: 9780527253059 (1975 reprint)
- OCLC: 552187560

Dusk of Dawn: An Essay Toward an Autobiography of a Race Concept is a 1940 autobiographical text by W. E. B. Du Bois that examines his life and family history in the context of contemporaneous developments in race relations.

Preceded decades prior by the better-known The Souls of Black Folk (1903), Dusk of Dawn focuses on Du Bois's relationship with Booker T. Washington, his reasons for leaving the National Association for the Advancement of Colored People, and a new concept of race.

In contrast to Washington's Up From Slavery, a blend of slave narrative and autobiography, Dusk of Dawn traces the genealogy of the race concept as it affected Du Bois's life. Du Bois elucidates his theoretical writing with personal experiences, and connects those experiences to the larger historical and social phenomena he identifies as central to the function and development of race in the United States. Reviewing the book in 1940, Metz P. Lochard, editor of the Chicago Defender, said "[i]t is no mere autobiography in the conventional sense... [Du Bois] very adroitly utilizes his life experience as an axis from which he surveys the whole panorama of American civilization with its vice and virtue, its prejudice and philanthropy, its consistency and grace; and above all with its contradictory and conflicting interpretations of race, Christianity and [d]emocracy."

Du Bois described the concept saying:

This was the race concept which has dominated my life, and the history of which I have attempted to make the leading theme of this book. It had as I have tried to show all sorts of illogical trends and irreconcilable tendencies. Perhaps it is wrong to speak of it at all as "a concept" rather than as a group of contradictory forces, facts and tendencies. At any rate I hope I have made its meaning to me clear.

== Chapters and major themes ==
The chapters of Dusk of Dawn can be divided thematically into three sections. The first four chapters focus on autobiographical information, contextualizing each anecdote in the relevant current events of its time. The next three chapters shift to a more ideological subject—the concept of race. Du Bois uses these chapters to theorize on race as a psychological complex of irrational logics and habits which are perpetuated to support an economically exploitative society. The final two chapters return to autobiography, chronicling Du Bois's life and ideology from 1910 to 1940.

=== A New England boy and Reconstruction ===
Du Bois begins with his childhood in Great Barrington and recounts his experiences through his graduation from high school.

=== Education in the Last Decades of the Nineteenth Century ===
Du Bois recounts his experiences at Fisk University and his studies in Germany. He notes that while he was thinking critically about race, his analysis was confined to "the relation of my people to the world movement. I was not questioning the world movement in itself."

=== Science and Empire ===
This chapter covers the years 1894–1910. During this period, Du Bois began teaching, attended the Niagara Movement, and published The Crisis. His thinking also shifted during this time. He became increasingly disillusioned with the ability of scientific evidence to transform racial bias. Instead, he began to think about racism as "forces or ideologies [that] embraced more than our reasoned acts. They included physical, biological and psychological forces; habits, conventions and enactments."

=== The Concept of Race ===
Du Bois argues for the arbitrariness of race, pointing to the "continuous change in the proofs and arguments advanced" in discussions on race in which "the basis of race distinction was changed without explanation, without apology." He also offers a detailed description of his family tree as he discusses themes of miscegenation, racial "chauvinism", and the role of Africa in black identity.

=== The White World ===
In this chapter, he challenges the dominance of the white world, stating plainly that "the democracy which the white world seeks to defend does not exist. It has been splendidly conceived and discussed, but not realized." Instead, the white world insists on "group and racial exclusiveness," creating a campaign of propaganda in which racist ideals are not mutually exclusive with democracy and Christian morality. In a conversation with a white character, Roger Van Dieman, Du Bois exposes the psychological and social paradox of racial inequality.

=== The Colored World Within ===
"The present question is: What is the colored world going to do about the current situations?"
Du Bois reflects on the status of African Americans, their exclusion from institutions, and the various social and political inequalities that are misread as natural inferiorities. With this in mind, he outlines an economic plan called "the Negro co-operative movement". This plan recognizes the power African Americans hold as consumers, and proposes that by utilizing the production capacities African Americans already have the African-American community can achieve a level of social and political autonomy unthinkable for the time.

=== Propaganda and the World War ===
Du Bois discusses the major events that shaped his politics as outlined in chapter 7: his involvement with the NAACP, the impact of the World War on Black consciousness in the United States, the significance of the Great Migration, the development of his Pan-African awareness, and the seizure of Haiti by the United States.

=== Revolution ===
In the concluding chapter, Du Bois reflects the influence of Marx on his thinking, his many trips abroad, and his "Basic American Negro Creed"—a manuscript of "that economic program of the Negro which I believed should succeed." Du Bois also discusses his artistic endeavors, the ways he encouraged creative expression in the black community, and his emphasis on graphic arts. "I sought to encourage the graphic arts not only by magazine covers with Negro themes and faces, but as often as I could afford, I portrayed the faces and features of colored folk." Having grown up in the nearly all-white Great Barrington, Massachusetts, Du Bois experienced a cultural awakening in 1885 when he entered the historically black Fisk University as a sophomore. He writes that at Fisk he realized he had not been taught anything positive about black people. He becomes enamored with their various shades of skin tone. "From my childhood I have been impressed with the beauty of Negro skin-color and astonished at the blindness of whites who cannot see it."
