= Encyclopedia Africana =

Book edited by Henry Louis Gates and Kwame Anthony Appiah

- Author: Henry Louis Gates; Kwame Anthony Appiah; As of 2005, >400 scholarly contributors
- Language: English
- Subject: General knowledge, Africana studies
- Published: Since 1999
- Publisher: Basic Civitas Books; Oxford University Press
- Publication date: 1999-2005 (printed version)
- Publication place: United States (1999, 2005)
- Media type: Multivolume print
- Dewey Decimal: 031

Africana: The Encyclopedia of the African and African-American Experience, or Encyclopædia Africana (Latin for 'African Encyclopaedia'), is a compendium of Africana studies including African studies and the "Pan-African diaspora." It was originally inspired by W. E. B. Du Bois' 1909 project Encyclopedia Africana. Du Bois envisioned an encyclopedia that was to be "unashamedly Afro-Centric but not indifferent to the impact of the outside world." "Africana studies" is a hypernym with subdisciplines including African studies, African American studies, etc.

Du Bois died before ever making the project a reality. Thus, the project was continued by Henry Louis Gates and Kwame Anthony Appiah. The two edited and published the first volume in 1999. The first edition appeared in a single volume, of which about a third each was dedicated to North American African-American studies, to Afro-Latin American topics of Latin America and the Caribbean and to Africa proper.

The second edition was published in 2005 by Oxford University Press in five volumes, including more than 3500 entries on 3960 pages.

== History ==
=== W.E.B. Du Bois and the Encyclopedia Africana ===
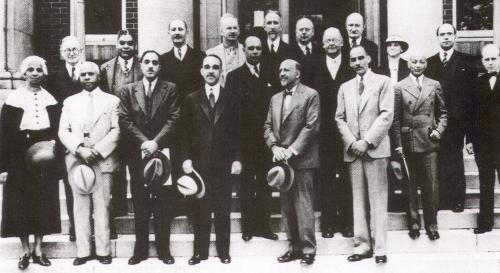
W. E. B. Du Bois and the Editorial and Advisory Boards of the Encyclopedia of the Negro, 1936

Daniel Alexander Payne Murray was one of the first African-Americans to work as a librarian at the Library of Congress in 1871. In 1899, Murray organized an exhibit at the 1900 Paris Exposition on Negro authors. Under his direction, his award-winning exhibit became the core of the Library of Congress's Colored Author Collection. Murray planned to expand his collection and create an encyclopedia of African-American achievement.

In 1901, Du Bois widened the scope of the project to encompass the entire African diaspora. He suggested that the encyclopedia be called the "Encyclopedia Africana" in a similar fashion to the Encyclopædia Britannica. Du Bois envisioned a scientific and comprehensive work on Africa and peoples of African descent that would refute the Enlightenment notion of Black people as devoid of civilization and the hallmarks of humanity. Due to lack of support from the established philanthropies, the project died.

=== Revival ===
Du Bois never completed the project. However, the idea of an encyclopedia that explored the Black experience was revived and expanded. In the late 1970s, while Gates and Appiah were attending the University of Cambridge in England, they first discussed the project. They proposed the project to the Britannica encyclopedia company but were told it lacked financial viability.

== Editions ==
- 1st ed. Basic Civitas Books, 1999, ISBN 978-0-46-500071-5
- 2nd ed. Oxford University Press, 2005, ISBN 978-0-19-517055-9

In February 1998, Appiah and Gates, and their team of African-American studies scholars, partnered with Microsoft to release Microsoft Encarta Africana, a CD-ROM variation of the Encyclopedia Africana accompanying the later released print version. Microsoft had the separate product for a brief period. Starting with the 2001 version, it was integrated into the main Encarta Reference Suite.

== Reception ==
The 1st edition was praised for seemingly fulfilling Du Bois's vision of creating a compendium that, like Encyclopédie, "would serve as a springboard for future scholarship and a bulwark against racist misconceptions." In 1999, Publishers Weekly reviewed the 1st edition and admired how "accessible" it is.

Filmmaker, Kahlil Joseph, was inspired by the encyclopedia. He deployed symbolic and literal elements of the project into his art exhibit and 2025 film BLKNWS: Terms & Conditions, a "filmic collage" of African and diasporic culture.

== See also ==
- Afrocentricity
- Africana studies
- African studies
- African American studies
- Encarta (distributed and later incorporated the on-line version, Encarta Africana)
