= The New Negro =

1925 anthology edited by Alain Locke

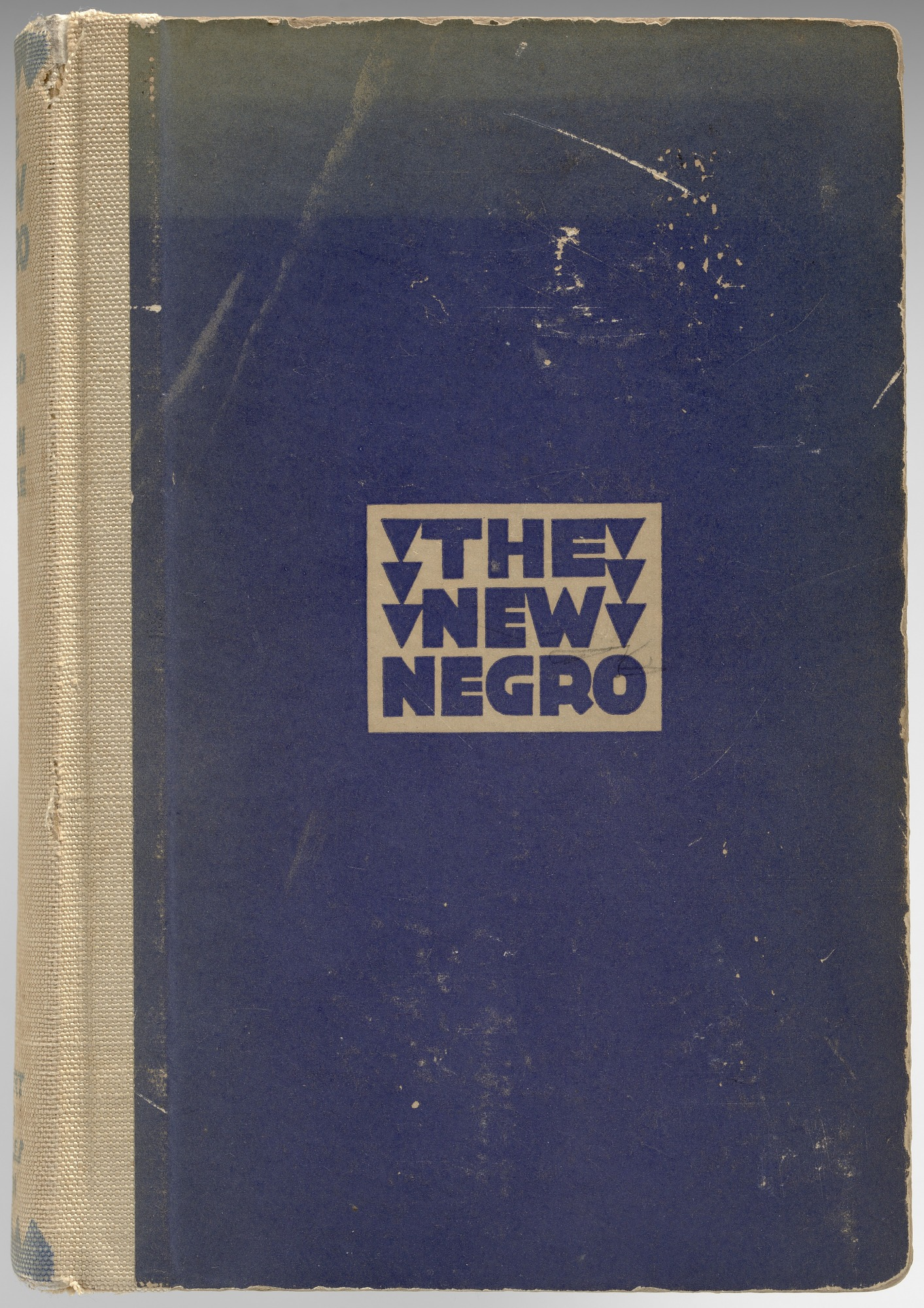
- Editor: Alain Locke
- Language: English
- Subject: African culture; African-American culture
- Genre: Non-fiction
- Published: 1925
- Publisher: Atheneum
- Publication place: United States
- OCLC: 640055594

The New Negro: An Interpretation (1925) is an anthology of fiction, poetry, and essays on African and African-American art and literature edited by Alain Locke, who lived in Washington, DC, and taught at Howard University during the Harlem Renaissance. As a collection of the creative efforts coming out of the burgeoning New Negro Movement or Harlem Renaissance, the book is considered by literary scholars and critics to be the definitive text of the movement. Part 1 of The New Negro: An Interpretation, titled "The Negro Renaissance", includes Locke's title essay "The New Negro", as well as nonfiction articles, poetry, and fiction by writers including Countee Cullen, Langston Hughes, Zora Neale Hurston, Claude McKay, Jean Toomer and Eric Walrond.

The New Negro: An Interpretation dives into how the African Americans sought social, political, and artistic change. Instead of accepting their position in society, Locke saw the New Negro as championing and demanding civil rights. In addition, his anthology sought to change old stereotypes and replace them with new visions of black identity that resisted simplification. The essays and poems in the anthology mirror real life events and experiences.

The anthology reflects the voice of middle-class African-American citizens that wanted to have equal civil rights like their white, middle-class counterparts. However, some writers, such as Langston Hughes, sought to give voice to the lower, working class.

== Structure ==
=== Part 1: The Negro Renaissance ===
Part 1 contains Locke's title essay "The New Negro", as well as the fiction and poetry sections. One of the poems, "White Houses", represents the African American's struggle to confront and challenge the White House and white America, in order to fight for civil rights. It shows a figure being shut out and left on the street to fend for himself. This is a figure who is not allowed the glory of the inside world, which represents the American ideals of freedom and opportunity. The hypothetical influence on the structure of race and ideology reverberated through "The New Negro".

=== Part 2: The New Negro in a New World ===
"The New Negro in a New World" includes social and political analysis by writers including W. E. B. Du Bois, historian E. Franklin Frazier, Melville J. Herskovits, James Weldon Johnson, Paul U. Kellogg, Elise Johnson McDougald, Kelly Miller, Robert R. Moton, and activist Walter Francis White.

The book contains several portraits by Winold Reiss and illustrations by Aaron Douglas. It was published by Albert and Charles Boni, New York, in 1925.

== Themes ==
=== The "Old" vs The "New" Negro ===
Locke commonly draws on the theme of the "Old" vs. the "New Negro". The Old Negro according to Locke was a "creature of moral debate and historical controversy". The Old Negro was restricted by the inhumane conditions of slavery that he was forced to live in; historically traumatized due to events forced upon them and the social perspective of them as a whole. The Old Negro was something to be pushed and moved around and told what to do and worried about. The Old Negro was a product of stereotypes and judgments that were put on them, not ones that they created. They were forced to live in a shadow of themselves and others' actions.

The New Negro, according to Locke, refers to Negroes who now have an understanding of themselves. They no longer lack self-respect and self-dependence, which has created a new dynamic and allowed the birth of the New Negro. The Negro spirituals revealed themselves; suppressed for generations under the stereotypes of Wesleyan hymn harmony, secretive, half-ashamed, until the courage of being natural brought them out—and behold, there was folk music. They have become the Negro of today, which is also the changed Negro. Locke speaks about the migration having an effect on the Negro, leveling the playing field and increasing the realm of the Negro because they were moved out of the South and into areas where they could start over. The migration in a sense transformed Negroes and fused them together as they came from all over the world, all walks of life, and all different backgrounds.

=== Self-expression ===
One of the themes in Locke's anthology is self-expression. Locke states: "It was rather the necessity for fuller, truer self-expression, the realization of the unwisdom of allowing social discrimination to segregate him mentally, and a counter-attitude to cramp and fetter his own living—and so the 'spite-wall' ... has happily been taken down." He explains how it is important to realize that social discrimination can mentally affect you and bring you down. In order to break through that social discrimination, self-expression is needed to show who you truly are, and what you believe in. For Locke, this idea of self-expression is embedded in the poetry, art, and education of the Negro community. Locke includes essays and poems in his anthology that emphasize the theme of self-expression. For example, the poem "Tableau" by Countée Cullen is about a white boy and a black boy who walk with locked arms while others judge them. It represents that despite the history of racial discrimination from the whites to the blacks, they show what they believe is right in their self-expression, no matter how other people judge them. Their self-expression allows them not to let the judgement make them conform to societal norms with the separation of blacks and whites. Cullen's poem "Heritage" also shows how one finds self-expression in facing the weight of their own history as African Americans brought from Africa to America as slaves. Langston Hughes' poem "Youth" puts forth the message that Negro youth have a bright future, and that they should rise together in their self-expression and seek freedom.

=== Jazz and blues ===
The publication of Locke's anthology coincided with the rise of the Jazz Age, the Roaring Twenties, and the Lost Generation. Locke's anthology acknowledges how the Jazz Age heavily impacted both individuals and the African-American community collectively, describing it as "a spiritual coming of age" for African-American artists and thinkers, who seized upon their "first chances for group expression and self-determination". Harlem Renaissance poets and artists such as Langston Hughes, Claude McKay, and Georgia Douglas Johnson explored the beauty and pain of black life through jazz and blues and sought to define themselves and their community outside of white stereotypes.

Some of the most prominent African-American artists who were greatly influenced by the "New Negro" concept, as reflected in their music and concert works, were William Grant Still and Duke Ellington. Ellington, a renowned jazz artist, began to reflect the "New Negro" in his music, particularly in the jazz suite Black, Brown, and Beige. The Harlem Renaissance prompted a renewed interest in black culture that was even reflected in the work of white artists, the most well known example being George Gershwin's Porgy and Bess.

== Reception ==
The release of The New Negro and the writing and philosophy laid out by Locke were met with wide support. However, not everyone agreed with the New Negro movement and its ideas. Some criticized the author's selections, specifically Eric Walrond, who wrote the collection of short stories Tropic Death (1926). He found Locke's selected "contemporary black leaders inadequate or ineffective in dealing with the cultural and political aspirations of black masses". Others, such as the African-American academic Harold Cruse, even found the term New Negro "politically naive or overly optimistic". Even some modern late-20th-century authors such as Gilbert Osofsky were concerned that the ideas of the New Negro would go on to stereotype and glamorize black life. Notable black scholar, author, and sociologist W. E. B. Du Bois also had a different vision for the type of movement that should have stemmed from the New Negro ideology, hoping that it would go beyond an artistic movement and become more political in nature. The New Negro did eventually influence a movement that went beyond being simply artistic and reshaped the minds of African Americans through political beliefs and promoted a sense of black involvement in the American government, but Locke was adamant about the movement going beyond the United States borders and being a worldwide awakening. Yet, due to the circumstances of the time and the tremendous diversity of opinions about the future of the movement, ideals stemming from the New Negro would not be widely acknowledged again until the civil rights movement (1954–1968). Still, Locke would go on to continue defending the idea of the New Negro.

== Legacy ==
After Locke published The New Negro, the anthology seemed to have served its purpose in trying to demonstrate that African Americans were advancing intellectually, culturally, and socially. This was important in a time like the early 20th century when African Americans were still being looked down upon by most whites. They did not receive the same respect as whites did, and that was changing. The publication of The New Negro was able to help many of the authors featured in the anthology get their names and work more widely known. The publication became a rallying cry to other African Americans to try and join the up-and-coming New Negro movement at the time. The New Negro was also instrumental in making strides toward dispelling negative stereotypes associated with African Americans.

Locke's legacy sparks a reoccurring interest in examining African culture and art. Not only was his philosophy important during the Harlem Renaissance period, but continuing today, researchers and academia continue to analyze Locke's work. His anthology The New Negro: An Interpretation has endured years of reprinting spanning from 1925 until 2015. It has been reprinted in book form some 35 times since its original publication in 1925 by New York publisher Albert and Charles Boni. The most recent reprint was published by Mansfield Center CT: Martino Publishing, 2015.

Beyond Locke's work being reprinted, his influences extend to other authors and academics interested in Locke's views and philosophy of African culture and art. Author Anna Pochmara wrote The Making of the New Negro. Journal articles by Leonard Harris, Alain Locke and Community and Identity: Alain Locke's Atavism. Essays by John C. Charles, What was Africa to him? : Alain Locke in the book New Voices on the Harlem Renaissance.

Locke's influence on the Harlem Renaissance encouraged artists and writers such as Zora Neale Hurston to seek inspiration from Africa. Artists Aaron Douglas, William H. Johnson, Archibald Motley, and Horace Pippin created artwork representing the "New Negro Movement" influenced by Locke's anthology.

== See also ==
- FIRE!!
- The New Negro: The Life of Alain Locke
- Jeffrey C. Stewart
