= New Negro (disambiguation) =

"New Negro" is a term popularized during the Harlem Renaissance of the 1920s.

New Negro may also refer to:

- New Negro Movement, another term for the Harlem Renaissance
- The New Negro: An Interpretation, a 1925 literary anthology edited by Alain Locke
- The New Negro: The Life of Alain Locke, a 2018 biography by Jeffrey C. Stewart
- The New Negro, a magazine published by Hubert Harrison
