= The New Negro: The Life of Alain Locke =

2018 biography written by Jeffrey C. Stewart

- First edition
- Author: Jeffrey C. Stewart
- Genre: Non-fiction, biography, African-American history
- Published: 2018
- Publisher: Oxford University Press
- Awards: Pulitzer Prize; National Book Award
- ISBN: 978-0195089578

The New Negro: The Life of Alain Locke is a 2018 biography of Alain LeRoy Locke written by historian Jeffrey C. Stewart. The biography examines the life of Locke, an African-American activist and scholar who mentored many African-American intellectuals and writers and whom many see as the "father" of the Harlem Renaissance, an intellectual and cultural movement that spanned the 1920s and 1930s. Published by Oxford University Press, The New Negro won the 2018 National Book Award for Nonfiction and the 2019 Pulitzer Prize for Biography.

== Alain Locke ==
Alain Locke was born in 1885 in Philadelphia, United States, and was exposed to the arts early in life. He was educated in a prominent school where his peers were white. He knew early in life that he was gay and the "friction" this caused among homophobic peers helped him both intellectually and creatively. Locke would go on to be the firstAfrican-American Rhodes Scholar at Oxford, before going on to Harvard to earn his PhD in Philosophy. Locke would go on to mentor many African-American writers and intellectuals including: Langston Hughes, Countee Cullen, Zora Neale Hurston, Claude McKay, Jean Toomer, Jacob Lawrence, and Eric Walrond. Despite his contribution to African-American, and American society, his life and his work has largely been overlooked.

== Content ==
The biography derived its name from a 1925 anthology titled The New Negro: An Interpretation, which featured many prominent African-American writers and came as a result of an essay written by Locke that focused on Harlem as the epicenter and "mecca" for black culture and creativity. The term "New Negro" came about during the Harlem Renaissance and stood for a person who was outspoken and who refused to accept Jim Crow laws and segregation. The 900-page biography explores Locke and the impact he made on the African-American intellectual and creative community from a variety of angles. Making use of primary sources of Locke's life, as well as interviews with those who knew him, Stewart discusses Locke's education and his role as both a student and an educator. The biography then goes on to explore such themes as race, politics, economics as well the arts and how this all contributed to the Harlem renaissance. Locke's private life is also discussed, including his relationship with his family and, being a gay man, his long-term search for a life partner.

== Reception ==
The New Negro received the 2018 National Book Award for Nonfiction, the 2019 Pulitzer Prize for Biography the Mark Lynton History Prize and the James A. Rawley Prize from the Organization of American Historians. It was nominated for the 2019 Randy Shilts Award and Lambda Literary Award.
