= Bahá'í Historical Record Survey =

The 1934-1936 Bahá'í Historical Record Survey (also called "cards") was an early demographic review of the Bahá'í Faith in the United States and Canada. The backgrounds of Bahá'ís were later studied in a number of ways - racial and ethnic heritage, previous religious background, geographical spread and sometimes how these have changed over the years. Complimentary data sources have also been used to add to some of the reviews including US Census publications and Bahá'í directories published in periodicals of Bahá'í literature.

A couple of these studies look specifically at the burgeoning black population of Bahá'ís amidst the wider society practice of continuing era of social segregation in the American society of the time which was against the Bahá'í teaching of the unity of all humanity. The vast majority of the Bahá'ís were white and mostly elder women, but the black segment of those states Bahá'ís were in responded more to the religion than the white population of those states did. The religion was also initially attracting Protestants, especially Unitarian Universalists and also among other more mainstream liberal denominations, but as history approached 1936 and beyond it attracted a greater diversity of religious backgrounds as it continued to grow more by conversion than by migration. However intentional migration had been undertaken shortly after this time - the religion had only been present in a few states mostly in the Northeast to North Central and West Coast coming up to 1936 but a goal was set to spread the religion to every state by 1944. As it spread inward from the West coast this mere presence established recognizable proportional membership in the population while in the higher population of the South it did not. But there it did take root too, more so among the black communities along the coastal regions of the South. Indeed, this wave of activity was undertaken during the first Seven Year Plan established by Shoghi Effendi which had the intranational goal of establishing a community in every state as well as establishing the religion in the countries of Latin America.

== Development, context, and reviews of the Survey ==
The 1934 American national convention affirmed the request of the national race amity committee for a survey of the racial makeup of the community affirming the request of the national amity committee work asking for localized amity committees and consolidation with concerned groups like the NAACP and Urban League. The same year the national youth committee including Marion Holley recommended a census be taken of youth as well. The Survey developed included historical information of the respondent - the date and place they were born, the date and place they joined the religion, and where they were living at the time of the Survey as well as their national and religious background.

The Survey was widespread by the summer of 1935. The complete collection of respondents is a little unclear. There have been four reviews of the Survey:

- In 1980 Arthur Hampson did a geography PhD using the Survey as one of his main sources of information to review the development of the Bahá'í community using more demographic information.
- In 1982 Gayle Morrison included an analysis of the black community from the 1936 Survey in her biography of Hand of the Cause Louis G. Gregory.
- In 1982 Peter Smith used the Survey via a selection of every third respondent to review the religion and examined the depth of religious backgrounds that could be perceived in anecdotes of the backgrounds of the Bahá'ís by then. Smith did a second review of the data published in 2004 mostly looking at comparisons with other surveys in other times and places.
- Robert Stockman included a review of the Survey especially for members of three communities in his PhD in 1990 including transcribing all of the physical cards into a computer file.
- In 2004 Gerome Green finished a senior thesis at Dartmouth College also reviewing the Survey for a look at the black community.

Hampson counted 1784 respondents of which 1729 were from the United States proper. Morrison and Stockman counted 1813 by 1936–7. Smith's sample approach would have totaled about 1803. Stockman collected the Bahá'í population up to about 1936 finding about 4000 people had joined the religion up to then. Unasked for, but some respondents included multi-page autobiographies.

Hampson was able to compare the community Survey with the Census of Religions of the United States for 1936 and early dates which counted 2584 Bahá'ís in the continental US in 1936. The census information was gathered from the respective religious communities - no additional censuses were done. So the national assembly's survey represented about 70% of the community of the US and Canada as understood by the national assembly. Still the Survey had the lowest percentage of responses in New York(mostly the city) and Illinois(mostly Chicago) and highest in the whole West.

== The overall community ==
Stockman estimated, partly on the basis of the Survey, that roughly 50-100 people identified as Bahá'ís during the time 'Abdu'l-Bahá was in America in 1912.

Smith broke down the respondents who were Bahá'ís by 1919, a total of 197 individuals still alive and members of the community by 1936: 90% were northern European (British, German, Scandinavian, generally “white” without ethnic background specified,) 6% African-American, but absent any Southern or Eastern European and Irish. This population was previously 33% of mainstream Protestant Christian background (Episcopal, Methodist, Congregationalist, Presbyterian and Baptist,) 11% Lutheran, 5% Unitarian/Universalist, followed distantly at 3% by metaphysical denominations (Swedenborgian, Christian Science, Theosophy and New Thought,) while a definite if small overall presence was of those raised in Bahá'í homes. Or, put another way by Smith in 2004: 56% Protestant of any stripe, 17% "Christian", 5% Catholic, 2-3% Jewish, and 4-5% Bahá'í. The overall pattern of a few percent raised Bahá'í was shown to be the case in a number of other surveys, (outside the Persian community in the West that arrived later.) It was also 66% women.

Stockman broke down the communities of New York city, Chicago, and Kenosha, and across time, for what details they provided. Those three communities were significantly different: Kenosha was mostly Scandinavians and Germans, with mostly early converts being 1st generation immigrants, Chicago started with half American followed by English and German and added a significant black proportion of the community after 1921, and in New York the community identified as mostly American then English, and then added a proportion of German. His analysis also showed broadly similar patterns in the communities of Christian or Protestant groups which started out a dominant group and dropped percentage-wise approaching 1936 while those raised as Bahá'ís kept increasing with a couple small groups non-Protestants, (Catholics, Jews, or metaphysical groups) adding in as well: it started out more Protestant than the US in general but became more diverse than the US in general.

Hampson analyzed the Survey and Census results relative to the states that had a Bahá'í population, a minority of the states mostly in the upper mid-West to the Northeast and California, and compared the racial and religious groups for just those states. He argued that the rate of black declarants in those states was much higher than being proportional to the black population of those states, indeed their rate of affiliation with the religion was above that of the rate of white presence in those states, and, though fewer of the Survey respondents were sufficiently particular about their religious background, agreed they were mostly from a Protestant background with the refinement that the contribution of the Unitarians was well above that of their proportion of their presence in those states and above that of all other Protestant denominations though Episcopalian and Congregational were nearly tied for a distant second. The lowest rate of religious backgrounds relative to their population in the states with significant Bahá'ís presence were those of Jewish and Catholic backgrounds. However Stockman characterizes these groups as contributing significantly to the religious diversity of the Bahá'í community, and Smith also that in other surveys at other times Jews showed a significantly higher percentage of some communities.

Hampson was able to do a county-by-county analysis including of earlier times. By 1919 most Bahá'í communities had less than two dozen adults and many were an isolated group or individual. By 1925 the Faith was in about 50 counties - about 2% - and almost all major urban centers in the Northeast and West Coast excepting Denver, Omaha, Atlanta, Augusta, Miami, and St. Augustine. Hampson argued that unity struggles to accept leadership circa 1921-1925 showed some areas lost membership compared to before - only the early cores of communities by 1906 maintained their community populations. From 1925 Bahá'ís diffused into nearby regions with infilling and coalescence which favored local spread of the religion while the First Seven Year Plan was the one that established wider diffusion than just in the Northeast and West. Those national goals were fulfilled in major urban centers. From 1944 the local diffusion process remained in place since there was no regional goals. In the earlier period the focus of Shoghi Effendi was to raise administrative structure and initial work raising the Temple out of which, for example, rose a single national budget, while afterwards from 1937 almost the exclusive goal was on dispersal of the community.

Hampson generated maps of relative presence of communities and migrations up to 1936. He noted a number of points. While some of the growth in California was from immigration from the rest of the country more was actually by local conversion. The state of New York held its population of Bahá'ís steady even with the heaviest emigration out of the state of the Bahá'ís of the country. Illinois and Wisconsin also held steady with both had heavy immigration and emigration. Hampson also observed that most of the migration that occurred was far and westward and little close and southward. Interestingly rates of conversion in a state paralleled rates of migration to a state for most states, and for a time migration became the principle mechanism of the spread of the Faith where it had not been present before. The domestic goal of First Seven Year Plan included reaching an assembly status of every state whether the entire state had 110000 people (Nevada,) or over 6 million, (Texas.) Raising one assembly per state in the South did not rise to proportionality with the state population while to the West it did.

Two individual's cards have been published in biographies: Louis Gregory and Alain Locke.

== The black community ==
In Hampson's analysis, within the group of respondents in view of the total population of the country, the percentage of black Bahá'ís is lower than in the general percentage of blacks across the whole of America but they were also relatively sparse in those states with most of the Bahá’í population, but this might also be an effect of urban vs rural concentrations - there were also more cities in the North with Bahá’ís than more rural regions in the South.

If you profile the Bahá'í community only in the states they were well established in 1936 the per capita representation of blacks in the community was higher than whites - though the absolute population of blacks in the Survey was near 5% of the Bahá'ís that group was more numerous among the black populations of those regions than the white Bahá'ís were of the white population. The rate of blacks per million of their population in states with Bahá'ís in 1936 was 37 whereas for the whites it was 29 per million. That's near a third higher rate of adoption among blacks than whites proportional to their population in the states under consideration. Green speculated the religion "was at one time a very prominent feature of Black America.”

Green identified 88 respondents by 1935 were black vs Morrison's review of 99 by 1937. Hampson says 97 respondents to the Survey were black. Morrison and Green observed that the black respondents may have been under-surveyed for a number of reasons: the consequences of conscious or unconscious attitudes of the white majority, the unequal effects of the Great Depression, educational disadvantages and being disheartened have to race-conscious questions, and since the Survey was mediated by assemblies regions without assemblies, like the entire South, the black Bahá'ís of the South would not likely have heard of the Survey through the institutional call for the Survey. However, both also thought the Survey was a valuable tool to profile the black community and experience as Bahá'ís in general terms.

Louis Gregory was the earliest black Bahá'í of the respondents though others are known before him. According to the Survey only five blacks had joined the religion in the South, but near 60% were born in the South and near 70% had joined the Faith in the Northern area.

Green discerned two bumps in the overall rate of declarant blacks. One phase of enrollment among African-Americans was discerned between 1913 and 1920 (for 16 of the 88,) and another between 1927 and 1933 (36 of 88.) He concluded the Race Amity Conventions were not directly correlated with either group, having mostly run from 1921 to 1933 though they probably were places of an initial introduction to the Faith - cities that had hosted them only had five black enrollments while Seattle gathered four on its own. The largest concentration of people of color who responded to the Survey was in DC and it was also the location of the earlier of the two bumps in the rate of black adherents, who in general learned of the Faith from white Bahá'ís. The later phase of enhanced adherence was in Chicago and almost all were female who had been born in the South, and learned of the Faith in a context of other black Bahá'ís. This development in Chicago started from 1912 with 2 individuals and few by 14 after 1922. Zia Bagdadi, a Persian Bahá'í long living in American, crossed the lines of violence during the Chicago race riot of 1919 where he was noted he was "the one white man who went into the African-American sections during the riot and brought food to the hungry.” According to Gregory Bagdadi was shot at by both white and black protestors on his trips including to see Mr. and Mrs. Clark, black Bahá'ís, whose house had been attacked, themselves arrested and released when cleared by testimony of Bagdadi. Mark Perry identifies the wife as Mary (Byron) Clark(e). Among this group of black Chicago Bahá'ís was Robert Sengstacke Abbott in 1934, publisher of the Chicago Defender.

By 1936 the most common black Bahá'ís were female between 29 and 35 years of age(though also older), only been a Bahá'í few years (mostly since 1933), highly educated, married without children, been born in the South (such as Alabama, Georgia, Texas or Florida,) identified as black or mixed race, and moved to the North, usually to Illinois or New York (secondarily to Maine, Ohio, or DC - or to the West Coast,) employed as a teacher or social worker, been a social activist such as in YWCA/YMCA, NAACP or Urban League organizations, as well as members in Bahá'í Assemblies. Green also commented that when blacks joined many Christian churches it became a crisis that split many of them. From biographical information outside the Survey of known black Bahá'ís Green also observed that more than a few black adherents were from upper-middle class situations.

=== The African-American Bahá'ís by the end of the ministry of 'Abdu'l-Bahá ===
Morrison's tabulation specifies who had become Bahá'ís by 1921, the completion of the ministry of 'Abdu'l-Bahá, and can be compared at least regionally with a recent scholarly enumeration published in 2018.

A crude analysis by geography by 1921:

By 1921 via Morrison's tabulation	By 1921 via “Pupil” enumerated	Remainders in Morrison's not in “Pupil”
	1 Pleasanton CA	
3 in Chicago	1 Chicago	2 unknown from Chicago
6 in DC	18 in DC	
2 in San Francisco	2 San Francisco	
4 adults +4 children in Boston	3 Boston	~1-4 unknown from Boston including children
5 in New York	5 New York	
1 in Portland, OR	1 Portland, OR	
2 in Seattle		2 unknown from Seattle
1 in Minneapolis		1 unknown from Minneapolis
1 in Montclair, NJ		1 unknown from Montclair, NJ
	1 in Charleston, SC	
	1 Richmond, VA	
	4 Cleveland	
	1 Nashville, TN	
	1 Wilmington, NC	
	1 Harper's Ferry, WV	
Total of 29	Total of 40	about 11 geographically distinguishable

While those comparisons suggest about 50, Hampson estimated the complete black Bahá'í community of 1936 to be between 110 and 150.

Christopher Buck's 2018 enumeration by 1921 includes some notable people: Robert Turner, Louis Gregory, Harriet Gibbs Marshall, Coralie Franklin Cook, Mabry C. Oglesby, Sadie Oglesby, and Alain Leroy Locke.

In later times the black segment of the Bahá'í community grew to about 23% approaching 1980 in Los Angeles.

== The white community ==
Hampson reviewed the entirety of the respondents (US and Canada) for details but since the vast majority were white, the general characterizations in most ways are being reviewed in the context of the white community though there were more black respondents than Canadians.

Of the white respondents almost 70% were female amidst a community that highly variable and never above 3000 total until the 1940s. The proportion of males decreased most of the decades since the religion was established in America. Whites in the community by then were most underrepresented relative to the population at large among those younger than the group 35–40 years old. The percentage of males peaked around age 45-54 and females had a broad flat high from 40 to 65 - so that the proportion of Bahá'í women per age group increased until very late in age - 70 and above. That peak was at a rate around 45 Bahá'ís per million. The rate of Baha’i membership compared to the national population about matches the mean population age at about near age 45 combining men and women.

Hampson observed the overall structure of the age profile of the respondents was natural from increasing age once declared. He compared the Bahá'í population by age with a simple model from which he made some conclusions: there is a broadly near linear increase percentage of Bahá'ís in a rising age range among those still in the religion by 1936 affected only by the overall mortality rate and the overall increase in the size of the whole country, and there was a sharp increase in the adoption of the religion since 1926 and even higher from 1932.

Orientalist scholar E. G. Browne wrote a testimonial obituary for ‘Abdu’l-Bahá in January 1922 published in the Journal of the Royal Asiatic Society of Great Britain and Ireland wherein he says:

One of the most notable practical results of the Bahá'í ethical teaching in the United States has been, according to the recent testimony of an impartial and qualified observer, the establishment in Bahá'í circles in New York of a real fraternity between black and white, and an unprecedented lifting of the ‘colour bar’, described by the said observer as ’almost miraculous’.

An antagonistic attention against this engagement of the religion is to be found. A KKK newspaper The Fiery Cross had an entry against the "Bahaists and Babist" in New York. On the other hand, a 1925 brief profile of the religion in the African-American newspaper the New York Age sums it up: “That is quite a volume of advanced beliefs to introduce in one movement." In 1927 note was taken of the election of Louis Gregory echoing coverage in The Washington Sentinel on the election of Gregory exemplifying the "spirit of racial amity" at the 19th convention electing the National Spiritual Assembly. Despite all this no significant growth in the black community arose in New York by 1936 according to the Survey.

Hampson found that the whites were mostly Anglo-Saxon/British and almost completely that group plus the northern European (German/Scandinavian) with only a very small percent eastern or southern European though this approximates the general population well. Among the whites the suggestion from Hampson is that the background affecting attraction to the religion was not their ethnic heritage but one of previous religious experience.

=== Religious motivations and characterization ===
Most white Bahá'ís of the time were elderly white women of British background who had been Unitarian/Universalist or at least one of the liberal denominations (Episcopal and Congregational) of Christianity. The Unitarian/Universalist position is nominally closer to the Bahá'í position on the Christian idea of the trinity as well as the importance of a reasoned faith compared to dogma or church authority.

Smith proposed the members of the religious sub-groups were underreported into the mainstream groups for the Survey and by relying on anecdotal mention of various individual Bahá'ís discerned some subgroups may have been important - millenaries (especially Adventism), metaphysical esotericism and quest, especially the search going through Christian Science, New Thought and Theosophy,) religious liberalism, (its inclusiveness,) having a sense of a need for social reconstruction, and personal attachment to 'Abdu’l-Bahá (usually as the presence of the Christ spirit or more which transformed into an appreciation of the Covenant.)

Smith supported the millenaries group by anecdotally referring to several individuals, publications, and Greenacre reports and the advent issues featured in discussions of 1914 and 1917 though not generally circulated. Many presentations limited the unveiling of the ideas of End time era with the quick arrival at its conclusion without "apocalyptic horrors” but was referenced in 1914, linked with the Christian Era year 70 and destruction of Jerusalem and the Temple with the Bahá'í Era 70( which was in 1914.) This was added to with optimism that peace would be the natural consequence of the war period and according to one report was the key discussion of the national convention. Smith described the Bahá'í sense of millenarianism as more on the side of post-millenarianism theology, looking for a present active reconstruction of society, and that Bahá'ís definitely had some Adventism mixed in as well.

For the metaphysical movement being an appreciable part of the religious background of the white Bahá'ís, especially New Thought and Theosophy - following a religious search often away from the mainstreams - Smith observed that during 'Abdu’l-Bahá's tour in America in general and at Greenacre featured meetings with such groups, and the presence of Bahá'í membership in the Chicago New Thought Executive Committee. But this group also had a strain with the anti-individualistic approach to the religious priority of its leadership before 1919, and led to an ambivalent co-existent relationship until there were greater tensions later. There were new patterns of authority sanctioned while old methods of authority were rejected. Tolerance for non-scriptural practices was allowed but not endorsed albeit some were opposed like the belief in reincarnation. Some of these beliefs that were specifically opposed continued anyway but opposition to claims of personal authority was a greater issue - there were claims of individual conscience and special powers. However no process of these claims led to recognized authority in the religion though sometimes lasting or widespread recognition did exist and did lead to cliques and confusions. Secret meeting circles occurred which may have been largest in the case of W. H. Harmon who personally revered 'Abdu’l-Bahá and associated with the community and teachings but did not join the community. This led to the Committee of Inquiry of 1917–1918, (aka Reading Room Affair.) The group calling itself the Reading Room, avowing Harmon's personal authority, sent delegates to national convention and was challenged by Chicago House of Spirituality in Boston in 1917 - the findings of a committee were supported by attendees of 19 communities followed by essays about the affair in 1918. Criticisms included they were leading people astray who used occult pretensions to seek money. The 1918 convention was meticulously reviewed for delegate credentials and the convention approved the committee's findings.

Smith characterized the religious liberalism component of the white population's religious background as having arose out of Protestant transformation toward social Christianity between the Civil War and WWI and it was itself opposed by a rise of fundamentalism. The liberalism motivations made repeated statements of inclusiveness of ideas, to add to one's belief from other places, other religions, an approach of being “leaven rather than a cult” and a challenge "to be more true to what is deepest in their faith” while upholding the singular authority of Bahá’u’lláh followed by 'Abdu’l-Bahá and not break ties with previous religious affiliations and even used their presence in them to present Bahá'í ideas to them. The ambiguous liberalism had strains in relation to the Faith being a distinct set of principles. The liberalism emphasized a “live the life” pattern of action and sometimes as collective action. Smith notes peace organizations and race issues seeming to be the broadest efforts associated with this mindset of previous thinking and many audiences occurred of 'Abdu'l-Bahá and Bahá'ís with organizations of like mind: NAACP, Bowery Mission, Jane Addams Hull House but also volunteers to the League of Nations to enforce peace though how to proceed was not agreed.

'Abdu’l-Bahá's personal standing among many was combined with his personal style of tolerance and gradualism though this leveraged peaceable if opposition to existing worldly authority. In Britain the appreciation of 'Abdu'l-Bahá was less of a high station and the Americans offended the Londoners with their acts of personal devotion. Nevertheless, the primacy of `Abdu’l-Bahá of whatever appreciation was a unifying factor in the American Bahá'í experience and rose in time in the form of an understanding of the Lesser Covenant against the challenges of other points of view.

== After 1936 ==
During the first Seven Year Plan, 1936-1944, 153 Bahá'ís moved among the goal areas in America that succeeded in electing assemblies - an average of 6 per goal area. A few local residents must have joined in - and in some areas more and in some areas less. An additional 10 moved to areas that did not elect an assembly by 1944, another 42 moved to areas in Canada and Alaska and 24 moved to areas that became jeopardized. Altogether 248 moved - 10% of the community for the domestic goals alone. There was also an international goal was one assembly per country of the Western Hemisphere. In addition to intranational pioneers, at least some 28 pioneers and more than 30 traveling Bahá'ís registered their trips for the religion set off to 19 Latin American countries. Hampson observed a significant effect internationally was the role of individuals as well.

A few individuals have been found noteworthy in raising up communities in the country. Three ladies were noted who "single-handedly" established new communities by giving public lectures on then-popular topics and then inviting people to attend a series of classes on the religion. The number of local assemblies in America doubled from 1937 to 1945. Another factor was in the size which continued to be a key dynamic of the community - a tendency to encourage Bahá'ís to spread out to form more communities rather than larger communities once it reached about 15 adult active members of the community which has been documented from the 1940s. The average size of the community with assemblies in 1936 was 30 adults which dropped to 15 in 1947 and 14.2 in 1991; 15 was seen as ideal community size after 1936 and there was encouragement to spread out at that point and to go to small towns after 1976. In the winter of 1952-3 the Guardian said to disperse even for the largest communities, and on 28 May 1953 called for dispersal of pioneers to virgin areas and continued in later years. In the 1960s the act of local incorporation was suggested for a community with a minimum of 15 adults, and individuals living in communities with more than 15 were asked to spread out to sustain spiritual assemblies.

== Opposition and opportunity ==
Hampson observed most of the spread of the Faith over the long term has followed the three variables: higher area basic population, socio-economic dynamism, and highway penetration. He noticed an oppositional area however - that by 1980 “Baha’is fail to be present where one might expect …throughout a very large wedge that extends eastward (from the Great Plains) and gradually curls around the southern portions of Illinois, Indiana, and Ohio, terminating [into] the southern flank of Pennsylvania [and a] tiny prong … reaches the Atlantic via southern Virginia.” Hampson doesn't name this region but much of it is pretty much the middle and northern span of control of the Confederacy when it isn't an urban center. Some of this region fits the lack of dynamism and highway accessibility but not enough to explain the overall relative gap in Hampson's estimation.

This is contrasted with the unusual acceptance of the religion, in Hampson's analysis, along the northern regions of the Union especially along the Canadian border and then along the Gulf and southeast coast, to favoring the Bahá'ís, which Hampson speculates might be due to the Bahá'ís reaching out to the black community, which he notes more clearly since 1954. The region of resistance is also cut by some growth along the highways and towards larger urbanized areas from Chicago and the states near and west of Chicago (Illinois, Wisconsin, Minnesota, Iowa and Missouri), and in mid-Atlantic part of the South - Maryland, Virginia, North Carolina into South Carolina and Georgia which was largely more urbanized in larger population centers.

Bahá'ís were more concentrated in larger cities before 1936 and this was cut to less than half by 1976. Circa 1976 Bahá'ís favored towns up to 45000 people even above that of the national population and lived in major cities at the lowest rate. At the rate per million of Bahá'ís in the modern era, on average a town or county area of about 45000 people has enough people to form an assembly whereas larger cities with larger numbers of Bahá'ís could have larger numbers leave and not affect assembly status.
