= Bronze Booklet series =

Eight volume series edited by Alain Locke

The Bronze Booklet series was a set of eight volumes edited by Alain Locke published in the 1930s by Associates in Negro Folk Education, and "enthusiastically supported by the American Association for Adult Education, the Rosenwald Fund, and the Carnegie Corporation". These were "reading courses on various aspects of Afro-American history and culture", with "each booklet contained a readable text with discussion questions at the end of chapters as well as a list of suggested related readings".

According to Howard Martin, a professor at Howard University, "Dr. Locke's basic objective was to provide authentic information on major aspects of American Negro life, written by recognized, highly qualified authors, for a wide spectrum of readers, especially black Americans, at a low cost, so that the books could be afforded by the masses." Locke also "likely intended" white audiences for the volumes.

These were a "crowning achievement", "[p]erhaps the greatest service which Locke made to the adult education movement". Their success was "enormous": the "inexpensive booklets sold in the thousands and were in use all over the country, in libraries, high schools, churches, Y.M.C.A.'s, and meeting halls."

== Influence and legacy ==
The requirement to "shorten, simplify, and sharpen" academic ideas for the general reader "may have helped Williams to transition from his cautious Oxford dissertation" to Capitalism and Slavery. His "somber analysis" concluded "the Caribbean lives under a government of sugar, for sugar, by sugar", an "assessment that won him no friends among the colonial elites".

Though Locke was elected president of the American Association of Adult Education in 1945, that organization "decided not to reprint any of the Bronze Booklets."

== List of volumes ==
- Ira Reid, Adult Education Among Negroes.
- Alain Locke, The New Negro and his Music.
- Alain Locke, Negro Art: Past and Present.
- Ralph Bunche, A World View of Race.
- T. Arnold Hill, The Negro and Economic Reconstruction.
- Sterling Brown, The Negro in American Fiction.
- Sterling Brown, Negro Poetry and Drama.
- Eric Williams, The Negro in the Caribbean.
- W. E. B. Du Bois, following Locke's request, wrote a volume to be titled The Negro and Social Reconstruction, but was "deemed too radical for publication". Alexander states this was "unpublished until 1985", though Douglas states the section that "came to be known as the "Basic American Negro Creed"" was "published in a column in 1936 and then again four years later, in the final chapter of Dusk of Dawn.

Locke also unsuccessfully requested a volume on history from Carter G. Woodson. He later turned to Arturo Schomburg, whose manuscript went unrevised and unpublished.
