= Eric D. Walrond =

Afro-Caribbean writer (1898–1966)

- Born: Eric Derwent Walrond; 18 December 1898; Georgetown, British Guiana
- Died: 8 August 1966 (aged 67); London, United Kingdom
- Resting place: Abney Park Cemetery, London
- Citizenship: British subject
- Education: Columbia University
- Occupation: Writer
- Writing career
- Notable work: Tropic Death
- Movement: Harlem Renaissance

Eric Derwent Walrond (18 December 1898 – 8 August 1966) was an Afro-Caribbean writer and journalist. A member of the Harlem Renaissance, he was well-travelled, moving early in life to live in Barbados, then Panama, New York City, and eventually England. His work, which spanned both fiction and non-fiction, was often concerned with the Caribbean diaspora and the brutal, global consequences of racism, imperialism, and slavery.

His only published book was Tropic Death, released in New York City in 1926 when he was 28; collecting short stories that Walrond wrote for various periodicals, it remains in print today as a classic of its era. James Davis, who wrote a biography of Walrond, suggested that "the most significant contribution Walrond made to the Harlem Renaissance [was] negotiating the unevenly articulated worlds of West Indian and African American New York and writing about it, code switching in subject matter and lexicon."

== Early life and education ==
Walrond was born in Georgetown, British Guiana, to a Barbadian mother and a Guyanese father. When he was eight years old, his father left to find work in the Panama Canal Zone, and he moved with his mother, Ruth, to live with relatives in Barbados, where he attended St. Stephen's Boys' School. In 1911, he moved to Colon, Panama, when the Panama Canal was being constructed. Here, Walrond completed his school education and became fluent in Spanish as well as English. He did so while navigating the racism and exclusion from Spanish-speaking white Panamanians, experiences which left a painful impression on him.

Following training as a secretary and stenographer, he was employed as a clerk in the Health Department of the Canal Commission at Cristóbal, and as a reporter for the Panama Star-Herald newspaper. In 1918, he moved to New York, where he attended Columbia University and was taught by Dorothy Scarborough. He was a member of Alpha Phi Alpha fraternity. Walrond had trouble finding a job in the United States, something he attributed to racial discrimination. The following extract from his short story "On Being Black" illustrates his disillusionment:

"I am a stenographer. I am in need of a job. I try the employment agencies. I battle with anaemic youngsters and giggling flappers. I am at the tail end of a long line—only to be told the job is already filled. I am ignorantly optimistic."

Walrond compared discrimination in the United States and in Panama, linking it to economic institutions which exploited and perpetuated racism for profit. His "liminal status as an outsider twice removed" led to racism from white Americans, and estrangement from African Americans as a Caribbean immigrant.

== Harlem Renaissance writer ==
In New York, Walrond initially worked as hospital secretary, porter, and stenographer. His first writing job in the US was as a part-time associate with The Weekly Review; while working there, he met the publisher Marcus Garvey, also a West Indian immigrant. Walrond's utopian sketch of a united Africa, "A Senator's Memoirs" (1921), won a prize sponsored by Garvey.

From 1921 to 1923, Walrond was editor and co-owner of an African-American weekly called the Brooklyn and Long Island Informer, the goal of which was to serve the immigrant community's needs. He was then hired as associate editor of Negro World, the paper of Garvey's Universal Negro Improvement Association (UNIA). By 1925, Walrond had started to distance himself from Garvey; while Garvey wanted him to write more polemically, Walrond wished to focus on the art of literature.

Walrond was also a contributor to The Smart Set, The New Republic, and Vanity Fair. In 1922, Walrond published "On Being Black" in The New Republic, regarding racist attitudes that he had experienced in his life. In 1923, he wrote an essay for Current History titled "The New Negro Faces America," in which he expressed dissatisfaction with the aspirations of W. E. B. Du Bois, Booker T. Washington, and Marcus Garvey:

The rank and file of negroes are opposed to Garveyism; dissatisfied with the personal vituperation and morbid satire of Mr. Du Bois, and prone to discount Major Moton's Tuskegee as a monument of respectable reaction... [The negro] is looking toward a broader leadership. That which he has at present is either old-fashioned, unrepresentative of his spirit and desires, or stupid, corrupt, and hate-mad."

He subsequently became a protégé of the National Urban League's director Charles S. Johnson. Between 1925 and 1927 he was a contributor to, and business manager of, the Urban League's Opportunity magazine, which had been founded in 1923 to help bring to prominence African-American contributors to the arts and politics of the 1920s.

As Walrond's career progressed, his focus shifted from the political towards Black culture. In 1925, his work appeared in Alain Locke's anthology alongside work by Langston Hughes, Zora Neale Hurston, and Jean Toomer.

Walrond first published first short story was called "The Palm Porch", which describes a brothel in the Canal Zone, where a merciless plot to take over the land unfolds. His other short stories included "On Being a Domestic" (1923), "Miss Kenny's Marriage" (1923), "The Stone Rebounds" (1923), "Vignettes of the Dusk" (1924), "The Black City" (1924), and "City Love" (1927). In both 1928 and 1929, he was awarded the Guggenheim Fellowship for Fiction.

== Tropic Death ==
One of Walrond's biggest accomplishments was Tropic Death, published in 1926. Tropic Death is a collection of 10 short fictions, many of which had been previously published in small magazines. The scholar Kenneth Ramchand described Walrond's book as a "blistering" work of the imagination; others described his work as "impressionistic" and "frequently telegraphic", reflecting his use of short sentences. The following extract from his short story "Subjection" illustrates his lyrical narrative style:

"A ram-shackle body, dark in the ungentle spots exposing it, jogged, reeled and fell at the tip of a white bludgeon. Forced a dent in the crisp caked earth. An isolated ear lay limp and juicy, like some exhausted leaf or flower, half joined to the tree whence it sprang. Only the sticky milk flooding it was crimson, crimsoning the dust and earth."

Much of the dialogue between Walrond's characters is written in dialect, using the many different tongues loosely centered on the English language to portray the diversity of characters associated with the pan-Caribbean diaspora. Arnold Rampersad, who wrote the introduction for a 2013 edition of Tropic Death, places it among "a number of key books by authors who practically revolutionized the idea of regionalism in America and elsewhere. Here one thinks of texts such as Adventures of Huckleberry Finn, James Joyce's Dubliners, Sherwood Anderson's Winesburg, Ohio, Jean Toomer's Cane, and William Faulkner's The Sound and the Fury."

W. E. B. Du Bois praised the book's attention to the Black experience in a country other than the United States. In his book review, Du Bois commented:

"Here is a book of ten stories of death, which, with impressionistic pen and little plot, show forth with singular vividness the life of black laborers of the West Indies. There is superstition, unusual dialect, singular economic glimpse; but above all, there is truth and human sympathy."

== Life after career ==
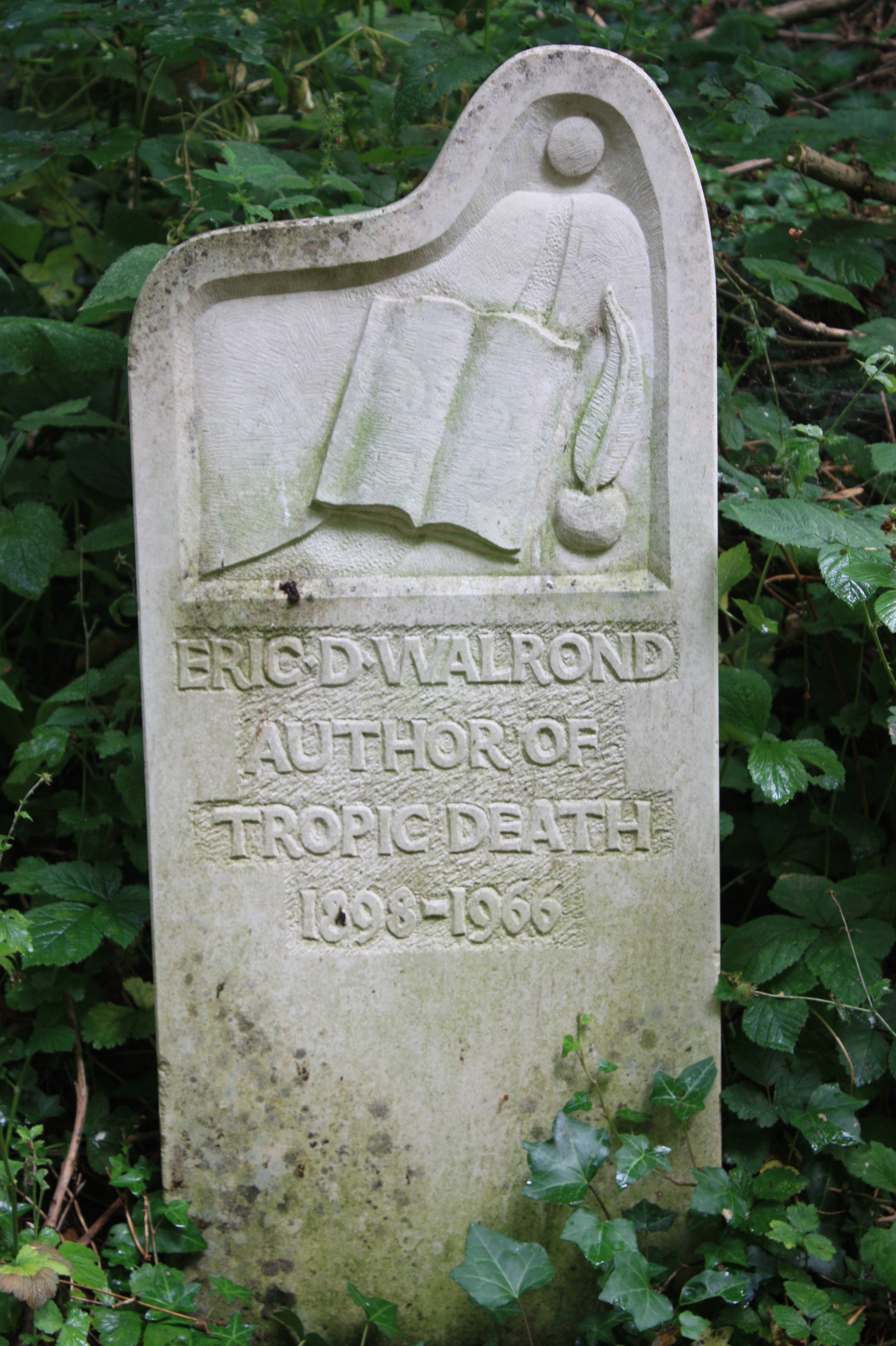
Walrond's grave in Abney Park Cemetery, London

In 1928, after a decade living in the United States, Walrond left to visit Panama, intending to write another novel. He would return to the US to visit his parents only once after this. He did not finish his novel, and moved to Paris in 1929. Although he researched extensively and wrote a manuscript about the development of Panama, preparing to publish a history titled The Big Ditch, his publisher Horace Liveright abandoned their contract in the wake of the Great Depression; Walrond was forced to borrow money to return to New York and reclaim the document from extortionate capture. He continued to write, but did not receive as much attention as earlier in his career. In 1932, he moved to England, where he settled for the rest of his life.

In England, Walrond met writers and artists during the 1930s, including Winifred Holtby. He continued to employ his editorial skills occasionally while working as an accountant. From 1939 to 1952, he lived at 9 Ivy Terrace Bradford-on-Avon, Wiltshire while employed at the Avon Rubber factory in Melksham. In 1952, he admitted himself to a psychiatric hospital, Roundway Hospital in Devizes, where he remained until 1957. He published his last story in the Roundway Review in 1954, while he was a patient at the hospital's psychiatric facility in Wiltshire, England. He also released excerpts from The Big Ditch here, although they failed to gain greater attention. After he left the hospital, he participated in a theatrical production at London's Royal Court Theatre in the aftermath of the 1958 Notting Hill race riots. There, he also produced a literary work in Masks of Arcady. Robert Bone, scholar of African American literature and a professor of English at Columbia University, gives details of this production in his CLA Journal.

Walrond suffered from many health problems, including numerous heart attacks; he died as a result of his fifth attack. On 8 August 1966, at the age of 67, Walrond collapsed on a street in central London, and was pronounced dead on arrival at St. Bartholomew's Hospital. Following an autopsy, Walrond was buried in an unmarked common grave at Abney Park Cemetery, Stoke Newington, on 17 September 1966. A memorial for him was carved in 2008 by the Abney Park stonecarver’s group, and placed near his burial spot on Watt's Walk.

== Legacy ==
Despite only living in the US for ten years, Walrond was significant to the Harlem Renaissance and African-American literature. His focus on the global legacy of imperial slavery, observations of the identities of the Caribbean diaspora, command of regional dialects, and impressionistic storytelling were politically timely and artistically modern. He received many contemporary awards for his writings, including a Zona Gale scholarship at the University of Wisconsin, a Harmon Award, and a Guggenheim Fellowship.

After his death, which occurred while he was living in financial precarity and cultural obscurity, his early literary work has enjoyed wider recognition, as reflected in the anthologies Winds Can Wake up the Dead... and The Penguin Book of Caribbean Short Stories, both published in the 1990s. Attention to his output has grown further since, with In Search of Asylum published in 2011 and James Davis's biography in 2015. At the time, however, Walrond's passing went relatively unnoticed; Arna Bontemps wrote of his death in a letter to Langston Hughes, dated 1 September 1966. Countee Cullen's well-known poem "Incident" is dedicated to Walrond.

== Selected bibliography ==
Novels

- Tropic Death, New York: Boni & Liveright, 1926.

Anthology

- Parascandola, Louis J. (ed.), Winds Can Wake Up the Dead: an Eric Walrond Reader, Wayne State University Press, 1998.
- Parascandola, Louis J., and Carl A. Wade (eds), In Search of Asylum: the Later Writings of Eric Walrond, University Press of Florida, 2011.
