= Incident (poem) =

"Incident" is a poem by Countee Cullen, describing a black child's exposure to racism from a white child. It was first published in his 1925 poetry collection "Color".

"Incident"

(For Eric Walrond)

Once riding in old Baltimore,
Heart-filled, head-filled with glee,
I saw a Baltimorean
Keep looking straight at me.

Now I was eight and very small,
And he was no whit bigger,
And so I smiled, but he poked out
His tongue, and called me, “Nigger.”

I saw the whole of Baltimore
From May until December;
Of all the things that happened there
That’s all that I remember.

— "Incident" (1925)

== Reception ==
The Poetry Foundation says that the poem "throbs with anger", and considers it to be autobiographical. The University of Baltimore's Baltimore Literary Heritage Project stated that it "paints an ugly—albeit accurate—picture" of early 20th-century Baltimore.

Rita Dove has called it "heart-wrenching", while Trudier Harris finds it to be "one of [Cullen's] (...) most effective pieces", opining that it "shows that America is not fully American for blacks living on its soil".

== Analysis ==
Rachel Blau Duplessis observes that the poem depicts "the blow of social learning of one’s place in a racial/racist order", and notes that "the central quatrain proposes the equality of the children in size, demeanor, and in age, indeed, in every way but one", and that the word "whit" not only "means 'particle' or 'iota'", but also "irresistibly suggests both 'white' and 'wit.'"

Cary Nelson argues that Cullen's preference for traditional and "childlike" forms of poetry means that the word "nigger" is a "violation" that is "more disturbing and effective than its appearance in a modernist collage would be."
