= Color (Countee Cullen book) =

Book of poems by Countee Cullen (1925)

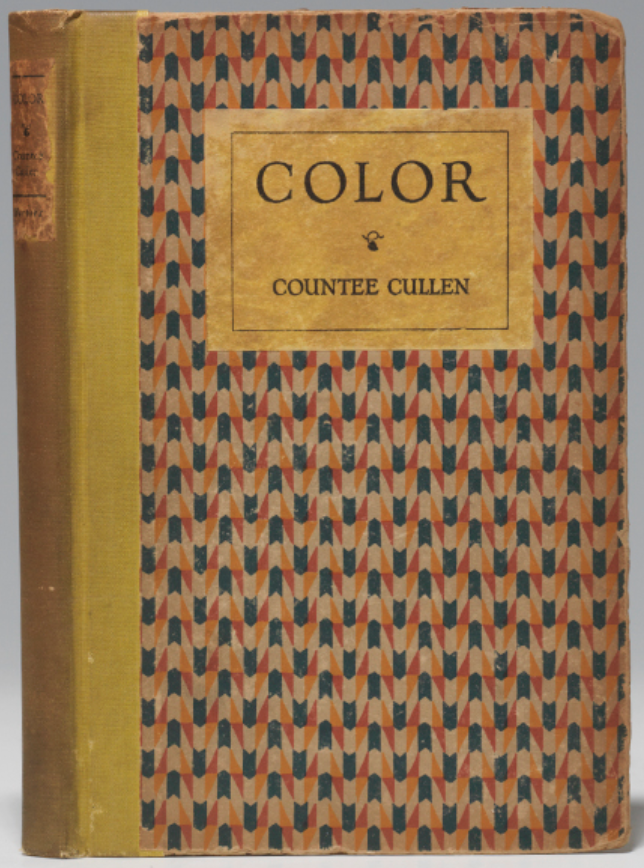
- Cover of the book's first edition
- Author: Countee Cullen
- Language: English
- Genre: Poetry
- Publisher: Harper & Brothers
- Publication date: 1925
- Publication place: U.S.A.

Color is a 1925 book of poems by Countee Cullen and it's his first published book. The book was published by Harper & brothers, while Cullen was 22 years of age and had just graduated from New York University. Prior to its release, Cullen was viewed as a new up-and-coming poet.

Color explores themes of race and lost heritage. His poems range from those that avoid race to those highlighting the harsh reality of being African American. Through his work, Cullen reveals his perspective on the African American experience, examining the psychology and soul of his community.

The reviews for Countee Cullen's Color praised the poet's artistic talent, and highlighted the lyrical quality, emotional depth, and vibrant imagery of his work. Many reviewers saw Cullen as a promising new voice in American poetry, with some emphasizing his potential to become a major figure in the literary world.

== Concept and content ==
Color is Countee Cullen's first published book and color is "in every sense its prevailing characteristic." Cullen discusses heavy topics regarding race and the distance of one's heritage from their motherland and how it is lost. It has been said that his poems fall into a variety of categories: those that with no mention were made of color. Secondly, the poems that circled around the consciousness of African Americans and how being a "Negro in a day like this" in America is very cruel. Through Cullen's writing, readers can view his own subjectivity of his inner workings and how he viewed the Negro soul and mind. He discusses the psychology of African Americans in his writings and gives an extra dimension that forces the reader to see a harsh reality of Americas past time. "Heritage" is one of Countee Cullen's best-known poems published in this book. Although it is published in Color, it originally appeared in The Survey, March 1, 1925. Count Cullen wrote "Heritage" during a time when African-American artists were dreaming of Africa. During the Harlem Renaissance, Cullen, Hughes, and other poets were using their creative energy trying fuse Africa into the narrative of their African-American lives. In "Heritage", Cullen grapples with the separation of his African culture and history created by the institution of slavery. To Cullen, Africa was not a place of which he had personal knowledge. It was a place that he knew through someone else's description, passed down through generations. Africa was a place of heritage. Throughout the poem, he struggles with the cost of the cultural conversion and religious conversion of his ancestors when they were away "torn from Africa".

== Background and release ==
Color was published in 1925 by Harper & Brothers. At the time of its released, Cullen was 22 years old and had just graduated from New York University with a Bachelors in Arts. At the time of its release Cullen was seen as an up-and-coming poet, having won his first poetry Award, the first prize at the "Federation of Women's clubs", in high school several years earlier.

In the sleeve of Color, writer Carl Van Vechten wrote "one of the best Negro writers, Countee Cullen is the youngest of them all. He was barely twenty-one when The Shroud of Color (published in November, 1924, issue of The American Mercury) created a sensation analogous to that created by the appearance of Edna St. Vincent Millay Renascence in 1912, lifting its author at once to a position in the front rank of contemporary poets, white or black.”

== Reception ==
=== Initial reviews ===
In his review in The Washington Post, William Allen White wrote that Cullen "has written and published a volume of poetry which is clearly of a high order — musical, emotional, colorful, beautiful. The book is not the work of a prodigy. It is the work of an artist. If Cullen lives and grows he will be one of the major American poets".

In his review published in The Arizona Daily Star, Henry Leffert said that as a first book it "immediately stamps him as an authentic poet. A poet, who, if this book speak at all true, Is bound to be one of the real singing voices of America".

In The St. Paul Echo review written by Carl H. Litzenberg praised Cullen's talents and said that he "has unlimited versatility, it seems, and he is able to write upon any subject from titles pertaining to the defense of his down-trodden race to light capricious love songs". On the down side Litzenberg said he felt the editing of the book was poor and added "the main fault we find in "Color" is not in the poetry itself, but that it seems to be poorly edited. There is a malarrangement, so speak, and it is fairly safe to say that the book could have been far more enjoyable had little more care been exercised on the format".

In The Nashville Tennessean's book review and literary page, conducted by Donald Davidson, the consensus of the book is that "at any rate, no objection can offset the fact that in "Color" Countee Cullen has produced a group of striking poems, demanding respect from all who respect the fine art, of poetry".

Herbert S. Gorman’s The New York Times review praised Color for its exceptional lyrical quality and modern sensitivity, remarkable for a poet so young. While cautioning against overpraise that might stunt Cullen's growth, Gorman acknowledged his potential for creating enduring work. He highlighted poems like “The Shroud of Color” for their depth and pieces such as “For a Lady I Know” for their sharp wit and satirical edge. Though some poems reflect a race-conscious bitterness, Gorman lauded Cullen’s ability to infuse them with genuine poetic beauty, marking him as a talent to watch.

=== Retrospective reviews ===
James W. Ivy mentioned "Color" in an article in the Pittsburgh Courier about African American literature. He wrote that the book is "a volume of high lyric quality rich in imagination and intellectual content".
