= Jeffrey C. Stewart =

Pulitzer prize winner

- Born: Jeffrey Conrad Stewart; 1950 (age 75–76); Chicago, Illinois, US
- Awards: National Book Award (2018); Pulitzer Prize (2019)

Academic background
- Education: University of California, Santa Cruz; Yale University
- Thesis: A Biography of Alain Locke (1979)
- Academic advisor: John W. Blassingame

Academic work
- Discipline: Black studies
- Institutions: University of California, Santa Barbara
- Notable works: The New Negro: The Life of Alain Locke (2018)

Jeffrey Conrad Stewart (born 1950 in Chicago) is an American Professor of Black Studies at the University of California, Santa Barbara. He won the 2018 National Book Award for Nonfiction and the 2019 Pulitzer Prize for Biography for his book The New Negro: The Life of Alain Locke, described as "a panoramic view of the personal trials and artistic triumphs of the father of the Harlem Renaissance and the movement he inspired".

== Career ==
In 2002-03 Stewart was awarded a Fulbright grant at the Roma Tre University. He founded Jeffrey's Jazz Coffeehouse in 2015. He coordinates jazz performances in Isla Vista, the local community adjacent to UC Santa Barbara's campus, in conjunction with his History of Jazz course. In 2019 UC Santa Barbara alumni declared him an honorary alumnus as they recognized his achievements, notably his comprehensive biography of Alain LeRoy Locke.

Stewart has been Visiting Senior Lecturer at the Terra Foundation's affiliate in Giverny, France; Residential Fellow at the Charles Warren Center in American History (Harvard); Fellow at the W. E. B. Du Bois Research Institute (Harvard); curator of exhibition To Color America: Portraits by Winold Reiss at the Smithsonian's National Portrait Gallery; curator of Paul Robeson: Artist and Citizen at Rutgers University; and curator of conference entitled North Hall 50 Years After: A Black Vision of Change at UC Santa Barbara for the weekend of October 12–14, 2018.

== Selected publications ==
- Jeffrey C. Stewart (2018). The New Negro: The Life of Alain Locke. New York: Oxford University Press. ISBN 9780195089578. LCCN 2017026626., which was a finalist for the 2018 Museum of African American History Stone Book Award.
- Jeffrey C. Stewart (2015). "Beyond Category: Before Afro-Futurism there was Norman Lewis". Procession: The Art of Norman Lewis., winner of the 2017 Alfred H. Barr Award of the College Art Association.
- Jeffrey C. Stewart (2014). "Bartleby, Foucault, De Tocqueville: contradictions of individualism". In Dominique Marçais (ed.). Modes and facets of the American scene : studies in honor of Cristina Giorcelli. Palermo: ILA Palma. ISBN 9788877047649. LCCN 2014429933.

Awards
Preceded by Masha Gessen	National Book Award for Nonfiction; 2018	Succeeded by Sarah M. Broom
Preceded by Stephen Kotkin	Mark Lynton History Prize; 2019; With: Andrew Delbanco	Succeeded by Kerri Greenidge
Preceded by Caroline Fraser	Pulitzer Prize for Biography or Autobiography; 2019	Succeeded by Benjamin Moser
