= Countee Cullen =

American author (1903–1946)

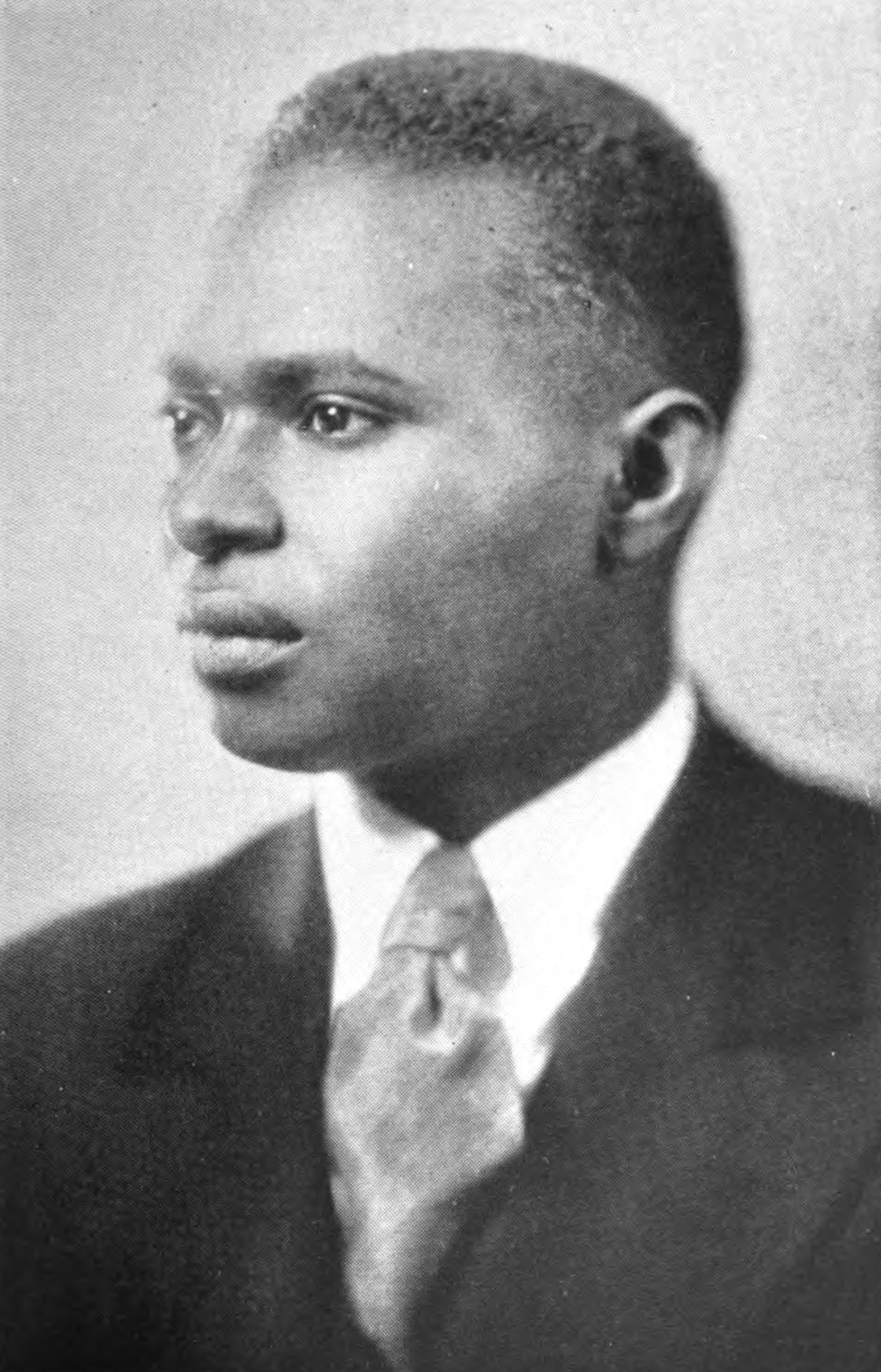
- Cullen c. 1927
- Born: Countee LeRoy Porter; May 30, 1903; Baltimore, Maryland, New York City, New York, or Louisville, Kentucky, U.S.
- Died: January 9, 1946 (aged 42)
- Education: New York University; Harvard University
- Occupation: Writer
- Spouse(s): Yolande Du Bois (m. 1928; div. 1930) Ida Mae Roberson (m. 1940)
- Writing career
- Period: 1923–46
- Genre: Poetry
- Movement: Harlem Renaissance

Countee Cullen (born Countee LeRoy Porter; May 30, 1903 – January 9, 1946) was an American poet, novelist, children's writer, and playwright, particularly well known during the Harlem Renaissance.

== Early life ==
=== Childhood ===
Countee LeRoy Porter was born on May 30, 1903, to Elizabeth Thomas Lucas. Due to a lack of records of his early childhood, historians have had difficulty identifying his birthplace. Baltimore, Maryland, New York City, and Louisville, Kentucky, have been cited as possibilities. Although Cullen claimed to have been born in New York City, he also frequently referred to Louisville, Kentucky, as his birthplace on legal applications. Cullen was brought to Harlem at the age of nine by Amanda Porter, believed to be his paternal grandmother, who cared for him until her death in 1917.

Reverend Frederick A. Cullen, pastor of Salem Methodist Episcopal Church, Harlem's largest congregation, and his wife, the former Carolyn Belle Mitchell, adopted the 15-year-old Countee Porter, although the adoption may not have been official. Frederick Cullen was a central figure in Countee's life, and acted as his father. The influential minister eventually became president of the Harlem chapter of the National Association for the Advancement of Colored People (NAACP).

=== DeWitt Clinton High School ===
Cullen entered the DeWitt Clinton High School, then located in Hell's Kitchen. He excelled academically at the school and started writing poetry. He won a citywide poetry contest. At DeWitt, he was elected into the honor society, was editor of the weekly newspaper, and was elected vice-president of his graduating class. In January 1922, he graduated with honors in Latin, Greek, Mathematics, and French.

=== New York University, Harvard University and Early Publications ===
"Yet Do I Marvel"

I doubt not God is good, well-meaning, kind,
And did He stoop to quibble could tell why
The little buried mole continues blind,
Why flesh that mirrors Him must some day die,
Make plain the reason tortured Tantalus
Is baited by the fickle fruit, declare
If merely brute caprice dooms Sisyphus
To struggle up a never-ending stair.
Inscrutable His ways are, and immune
To catechism by a mind too strewn
With petty cares to slightly understand
What awful brain compels His awful hand.
Yet do I marvel at this curious thing:
To make a poet black, and bid him sing!

— "Yet Do I Marvel" (1925)

After graduating from high school, he attended New York University (NYU). In 1923, at the Town Hall in New York City, he gave a speech to the League of Youth in which he said, “For we must be one thing or the other, an asset or a liability, the sinew in your wing to help you soar, or the chain to bind you to earth.” The speech was later printed in The Crisis (August 1923). Also in 1923, Cullen won second prize in the Witter Bynner National Competitions for Undergraduate Poetry, sponsored by the Poetry Society of America, for his book of poems titled, "The Ballad of the Brown Girl". Soon after, he was publishing poetry in national periodicals such as Harper's, The Crisis, Opportunity, The Bookman, and Poetry, earning him a national reputation. The following year, he again placed second in the contest, finally winning first prize in 1925. He competed in a poetry contest sponsored by Opportunity and came in second with "To One Who Said Me Nay", losing to Langston Hughes's "The Weary Blues". Cullen graduated from NYU in 1925 and was one of eleven students selected to Phi Beta Kappa.

That same year, Cullen entered Harvard to pursue a master's in English, and published Color, his first collection of poems that later became a landmark of the Harlem Renaissance. Written in a careful, traditional style, the work celebrated Black beauty and deplored the effects of racism. The volume included "Heritage" and "Incident", among his most widely anthologized poems. "Yet Do I Marvel", about racial identity and injustice, showed the literary influence of William Wordsworth and William Blake, but its subject was far from the world of their Romantic sonnets. The poet accepts that there is God, and "God is good, well-meaning, kind", but he finds a contradiction in his own plight reflecting the racial prejudice of the era: he is black and a poet. In 1926, Cullen graduated with a master's degree, while also serving as the guest editor of a special "Negro Poets" issue of the poetry magazine Palms. The appointment led to Harper's inviting him to edit an anthology of Black poetry in 1927.

== Sexuality ==
American writer Alain Locke helped Cullen come to terms with his sexuality. Locke aimed to introduce a new generation of African-American writers, including Countee Cullen, to the reading public. He also sought to present the authentic natures of sex and sexuality through writing, creating a kind of relationship with those who felt the same. Locke introduced Cullen to gay-affirming material, such as the work of Edward Carpenter, at a time when most gays were in the closet. In March 1923, Cullen wrote to Locke about Carpenter's work: "It opened up for me soul windows which had been closed; it threw a noble and evident light on what I had begun to believe, because of what the world believes, ignoble and unnatural".

Critics and historians have not reached a consensus regarding Cullen's sexuality, partly because Cullen was unsure of this himself. Cullen's first marriage, to Yolande Du Bois, experienced difficulties before ending in divorce. He subsequently had relationships with many different men, although each ended poorly. Each relationship had a sense of shame or secrecy, such as his relationship with Edward Atkinson. Cullen later married Ida Roberson while potentially in a relationship with Atkinson. Letters between Cullen and Atkinson suggest a romantic interest, although there is no concrete evidence that they were in a sexual relationship.

== Relationships ==
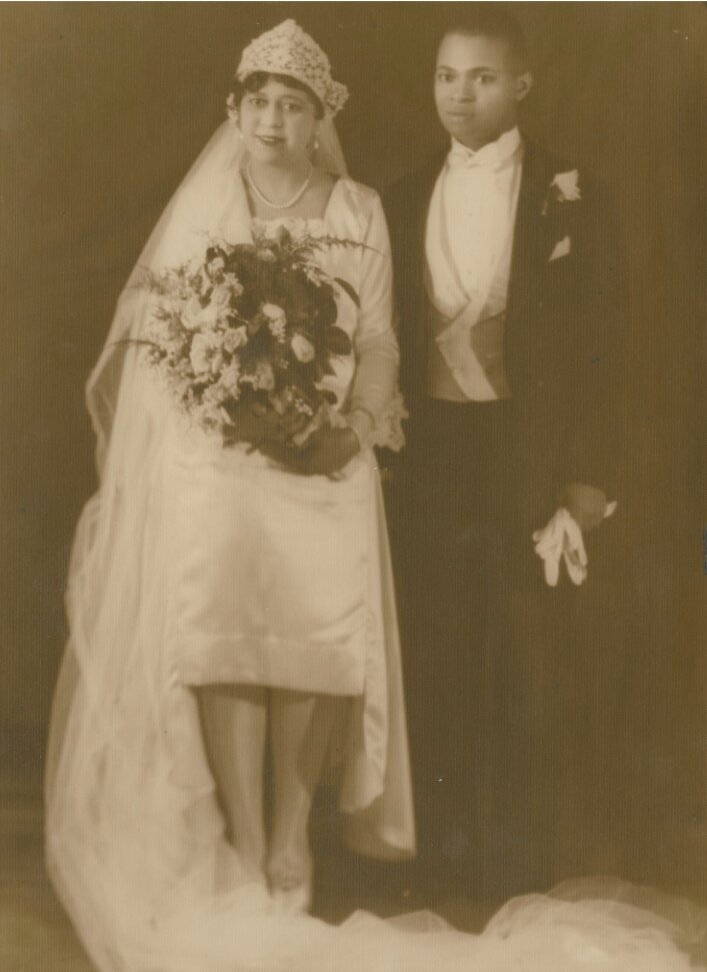
Cullen on his wedding day with Yolande Du Bois in 1928.

Cullen married Yolande Du Bois on April 9, 1928. She was the surviving child of W. E. B. Du Bois and his first wife Nina Gomer Du Bois, whose son had died as an infant. The two young people were said to have been introduced by Cullen's close friend Harold Jackman. They met in the summer of 1923, when both were in college: she was at Fisk University and he was at NYU. Cullen's parents owned a summer home in Pleasantville, New Jersey, near the Jersey Shore, and Yolande and her family were likely also vacationing in the area when they first met.

While at Fisk, Yolande had had a romantic relationship with the jazz saxophonist Jimmie Lunceford. However, her father disapproved of Lunceford. The relationship ended after Yolande accepted her father's preference of a marriage to Cullen.

The wedding was the social event of the decade among the African-American elite. Cullen, along with W. E. B. Du Bois, planned the details of the wedding with little help from Yolande. Every detail of the wedding, including the rail car used for transportation and Cullen receiving the marriage license four days prior to the wedding day, was considered big news and was reported to the public by the African-American press. His father, Frederick A. Cullen, officiated at the wedding. The church was overcrowded, as 3,000 people came to witness the ceremony.

After the newly wedded couple had a short honeymoon, Cullen traveled to Paris, France, with his guardian/father, Frederick Cullen, and best man Jackman. Yolande soon joined him there, but they had difficulties from the start. A few months after their wedding, Cullen wrote a letter to Yolande confessing his love for men. Yolande told her father and filed for divorce. Her father wrote separately to Cullen, saying that he thought Yolande's lack of sexual experience was the reason the marriage did not work out. The couple divorced in 1930 in Paris. The details were negotiated between Cullen and Yolande's father, as the wedding details had been.

Cullen was generally private regarding his personal relationships. Rumors circulated that a relationship between Cullen and school teacher Harold Jackman contributed to Cullen and Yolande's divorce. Jackman was a prominent figure in Harlem social circles. However, according to historian Thomas Wirth, author of Gay Rebel of the Harlem Renaissance, Selections from the Work of Richard Bruce Nugent, there is no factual evidence that the men were lovers, despite contemporary newspaper stories and gossip. In 1940, Cullen married Ida Mae Roberson and lived with her until his death in 1946. In the early 1940s, they lived on Sugar Hill in West Harlem at the Garrison Apartments.

Jackman's diaries, letters, and outstanding collections of memorabilia are held in depositories across the country, such as the Amistad Research Center at Tulane University in New Orleans and Clark Atlanta University in Atlanta, Georgia. At Cullen's death, Jackman requested that his collection in Georgia be renamed, from the Harold Jackman Collection to the Countee Cullen Memorial Collection, in honor of his friend. After Jackman died of cancer in 1961, the collection at Clark Atlanta University was renamed as the Cullen-Jackman Collection to honor them both.

== Harlem Renaissance ==
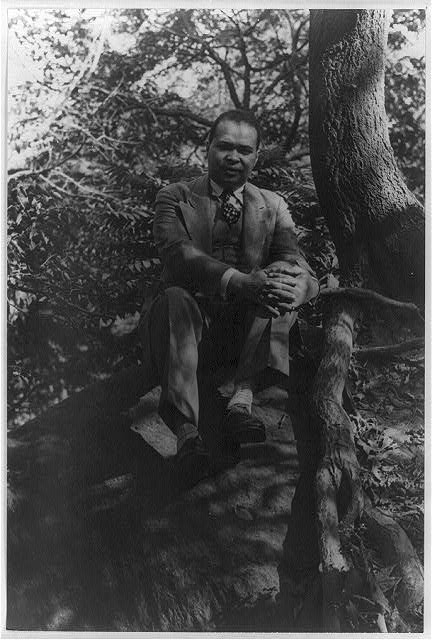
Cullen in Central Park in 1941, photo by Carl Van Vechten

The Harlem Renaissance movement was centered in the cosmopolitan community of Harlem, in New York City, which had attracted talented migrants from across the country. During the 1920s, a fresh generation of African-American writers emerged, although a few were Harlem-born. Other leading figures included Alain Locke (The New Negro, 1925), James Weldon Johnson (Black Manhattan, 1930), Claude McKay (Home to Harlem, 1928), Langston Hughes (The Weary Blues, 1926), Zora Neale Hurston (Jonah's Gourd Vine, 1934), Wallace Thurman (Harlem: A Melodrama of Negro Life, 1929), Jean Toomer (Cane, 1923) and Arna Bontemps (Black Thunder, 1935). Writers benefited from newly available grants and scholarships, and were supported by such established white writers as Carl Van Vechten.

The Harlem Renaissance was influenced by a movement called Négritude, which represents "the discovery of black values and the Negro’s awareness of his situation". Cullen saw Negritude as an awakening of a race consciousness and black modernism that flowed into Harlem. Cullen's poetry "Heritage" and "Dark Tower" reflect ideas of the Negritude movement. These poems examine African roots and intertwine them with a fresh aspect of African-American life.

Cullen's work intersects with the Harlem community and such prominent figures of the Renaissance as Duke Ellington and poet and playwright Langston Hughes. Ellington admired Cullen for confronting a history of oppression and shaping a new voice of "great achievement over fearful odds". Cullen maintained close friendships with two other prominent writers, Hughes and Alain Locke. However, Hughes critiqued Cullen, albeit indirectly, and other Harlem Renaissance writers, for the “desire to run away spiritually from [their] race”. Hughes condemned “the desire to pour racial individuality into the mold of American standardization, and to be as little Negro and as much American as possible.” Though Hughes critiqued Cullen, he still admired his work and noted the significance of his writing.

== Professional career ==
What is Africa to me:
Copper sun or scarlet sea,
Jungle star or jungle track,
Strong bronzed men, or regal black
Women from whose loins I sprang
When the birds of Eden sang?
One three centuries removed
From the scenes his fathers loved,
Spicy grove, cinnamon tree,
What is Africa to me?

— From "Heritage"

The social, cultural, and artistic explosion known as the Harlem Renaissance was the first time in American history that a large body of literary, art and musical work was contributed by African-American writers and artists. Cullen was at the epicenter of this new-found surge in literature. He considered poetry to be raceless. However, his poem "The Black Christ" took on a racial theme, exploring a black youth convicted of a crime he did not commit. "But shortly after in the early 1930s, his work was almost completely [free] of racial subject matter. His poetry instead focused on idyllic beauty and other classic romantic subjects."

Cullen worked as assistant editor for Opportunity magazine, where his column, "The Dark Tower", increased his literary reputation. Cullen's poetry collections The Ballad of the Brown Girl (1927) and Copper Sun (1927) explored similar themes as Color, but they were not so well received. Cullen's Guggenheim Fellowship of 1928 enabled him to study and write abroad.

Between the years 1928 and 1934, Cullen traveled back and forth between France and the United States. By 1929 Cullen had published four volumes of poetry. The title poem of The Black Christ and Other Poems (1929) was criticized for its use of Christian religious imagery; Cullen compared the lynching of a black man to the crucifixion of Jesus.

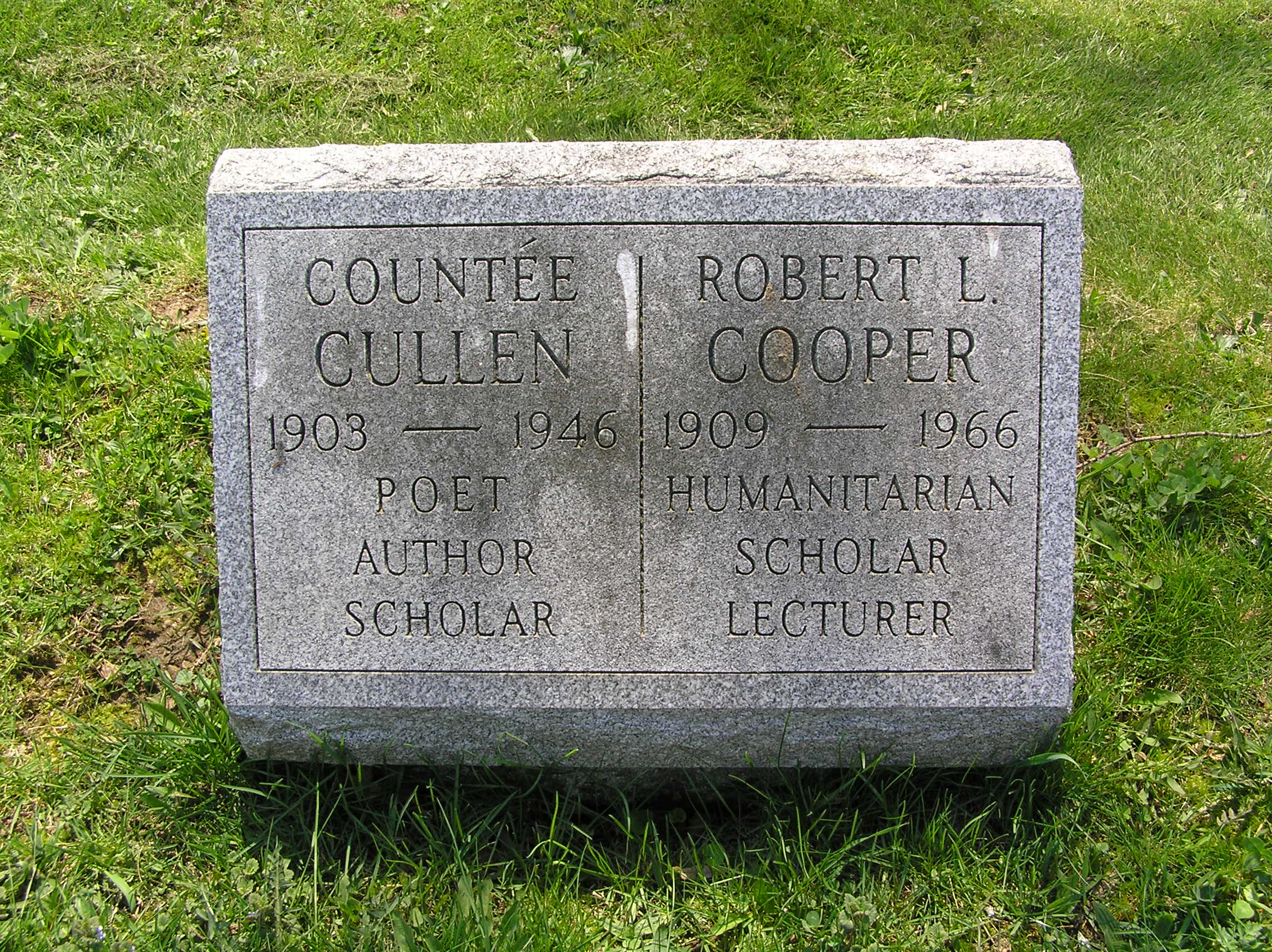
The grave of Countee Cullen in Woodlawn Cemetery. (The stone is shared with Robert L. Cooper, the second husband (1953–1966) of Cullen's wife Ida.)

As well as writing books, Cullen promoted the work of other black writers. But by 1930 his reputation as a poet had waned. In 1932, his only novel was published, One Way to Heaven, a social comedy of lower-class blacks and the bourgeoisie in New York City.

From 1934 until the end of his life, he taught English, French, and creative writing at Frederick Douglass Junior High School in New York City. During this period, he also wrote two works for young readers: The Lost Zoo (1940), poems about the animals who were killed in the Flood, and My Lives and How I Lost Them, an autobiography of his cat. Along with Herman W. Porter, Cullen also provided guidance to a young James Baldwin during his time at the school.

In the last years of his life, Cullen wrote mostly for the theatre. He worked with Arna Bontemps to adapt Bontemps's 1931 novel God Sends Sunday as the musical St. Louis Woman (1946, published in 1971). Its score was composed by Harold Arlen and Johnny Mercer, both white. The Broadway musical, set in a poor black neighborhood of St. Louis, Missouri, was criticized by black intellectuals for creating a negative image of black Americans. In another stretch, Cullen translated the Greek tragedy Medea by Euripides, which was published in 1935 as The Medea and Some Poems, with a collection of sonnets and short lyrics.

Several years later, Cullen died from high blood pressure and uremic poisoning on January 9, 1946, aged 42. He is buried in Woodlawn Cemetery in The Bronx, New York City.

== Honors ==
The Countee Cullen Library, a Harlem branch location of the New York Public Library, was named in his honor. In 2013, he was inducted into the New York Writers Hall of Fame.

In 1949 the anthology radio drama Destination Freedom, written by Richard Durham, recapped parts of Cullen's life.

== Literary influences ==
With Cullen's success transcending racial barriers, he developed an aesthetic that embraced both black and white cultures. He was a firm believer that poetry surpassed race and that it could be used to bring the races closer together. Although race was a recurring theme in his works, Cullen wanted to be known as a poet not strictly defined by race.

Cullen developed his Eurocentric style of writing from his exposure to Graeco-Roman Classics and English Literature, work he was exposed to while attending universities like New York University and Harvard. In his collection of poems To the Three for Whom the Book Cullen uses Greek methodology to explore race and identity and writes about Medusa, Theseus, Phasiphae, and the Minotaur. Although continuing to develop themes of race and identity in his work, Cullen found artistic inspiration in ancient Greek and Roman literature.

Cullen was also influenced by the Romantics and studied subjects of love, romance, and religion. John Keats and Edna St. Vincent Millay both influenced Cullen's style of writing. In Caroling Dusk, an anthology edited by Cullen, he expands on his belief of using a Eurocentric style of writing. He writes: "As heretical as it may sound, there is the probability that Negro poets, dependent as they are on the English language, may have more to gain from the rich background of English and American poetry than from the nebulous atavistic yearnings towards an African inheritance." Cullen believed that African-American poets should work within the English conventions of poetry to prove to white Americans that African Americans could participate in these classic traditions. He believed using a more traditional style of writing poetry would allow African Americans to build bridges between the black and white communities.

== Major works ==
=== Color ===
Color is Countee Cullen's first published book and color is "in every sense its prevailing characteristic." Cullen discusses heavy topics regarding race and the distance of one's heritage from their motherland and how it is lost. It has been said that his poems fall into a variety of categories: those that with no mention were made of color. Secondly, the poems that circled around the consciousness of African Americans and how being a "Negro in a day like this" in America is very cruel. Through Cullen's writing, readers can view his own subjectivity of his inner workings and how he viewed the Negro soul and mind. He discusses the psychology of African Americans in his writings and gives an extra dimension that forces the reader to see a harsh reality of Americas past time. "Heritage" is one of Countee Cullen's best-known poems published in this book. Although it is published in Color, it originally appeared in The Survey, March 1, 1925. Cullen wrote "Heritage" during a time when African-American artists were dreaming of Africa. During the Harlem Renaissance, Cullen, Hughes, and other poets were using their creative energy trying to fuse Africa into the narrative of their African-American lives. In "Heritage", Cullen grapples with the separation of his African culture and history created by the institution of slavery. To Cullen, Africa was not a place of which he had personal knowledge. It was a place that he knew through someone else's description, passed down through generations. Africa was a place of heritage. Throughout the poem, he struggles with the cost of the cultural conversion and religious conversion of his ancestors when they were away "torn from Africa".

=== The Black Christ ===
The Black Christ was a collection of poems published at the height of Cullen's career in 1929. The poems examine the relationship of faith and justice among African Americans. In some of the poems, Cullen equates the suffering of Christ in his crucifixion and the suffering of African Americans. This collection poems captures Cullen's idealistic aesthetic of race pride and religious skepticism. The Black Christ also takes a close look at the racial violence in America during the 1920s. By the time Cullen published this book of poetry, the concept of the Black Messiah was prevalent in other African-American writers such as Langston Hughes, Claude Mackay, and Jean Toomer.

=== Copper Sun ===
Copper Sun is a collection of poetry published in New York in 1927. The collection examines the sense of love, particularly a love or unity between white and black people. In some poems, love is ominous and leads to death. However, in general, the love extends not only to people but to natural elements such as plants, trees, etc. Many of the poems also link the concept of love to a Christian background. Yet, Cullen was also attracted to something both pagan as well as Christian. in one of his poems "One Day We Played a Game", the theme of love appears. The speaker calls: "'First love! First love!' I urged". (The poem portrays love as necessary to continue in life and that it is basic to life as the corner stone or the fundamental of building home.) Similarly, in "Love's Way", Cullen's poem portrays a love that shares and unifies the world. The poem suggests that "love is not demanding, all, itself/ Withholding aught; love's is nobler way/ of courtesy". In the poem, the speaker contends that "Love rehabilitates unto the end." Love fixes itself, regrows, and heals.

=== Poetry collections ===
- Color, Harper & Brothers, 1925; Ayer, 1993, ISBN 978-0881431551 (includes the poems "Incident", "Near White", "Heritage", and others), illustrations by Charles Cullen
- Copper Sun, Harper & Brothers, 1927
- The Ballad of the Brown Girl, Harper & Brothers, 1927, illustrations by Charles Cullen
- The Black Christ and Other Poems, Harper & Brothers, 1929, illustrations by Charles Cullen
- The Medea and Some Poems (1935)
- On These I Stand: An Anthology of the Best Poems of Countee Cullen, Harper & Brothers Publishers, 1947
- Gerald Lyn Early (ed.), My Soul's High Song: The Collected Writings of Countee Cullen, Doubleday, 1991, ISBN 978-0385417587
- Countee Cullen: Collected Poems, Library of America, 2013, ISBN 978-1598530834

=== Prose ===
- One Way to Heaven (1931)
- The Lost Zoo, Harper & Brothers, 1940; Modern Curriculum Press, 1991, ISBN 978-0813672175
- My Lives and How I Lost Them, Harper & Brothers Publishers, 1942

=== Drama ===
- St. Louis Woman (1946)

== As editor ==
- Caroling Dusk: An Anthology of Verse by Black Poets of the Twenties: Anthology of Black Verse. New York: Harper & Brothers, 1927.

== See also ==
- African-American literature
- Harlem Renaissance
- List of people from Harlem
