= Leonard Harris (philosopher) =

American philosopher

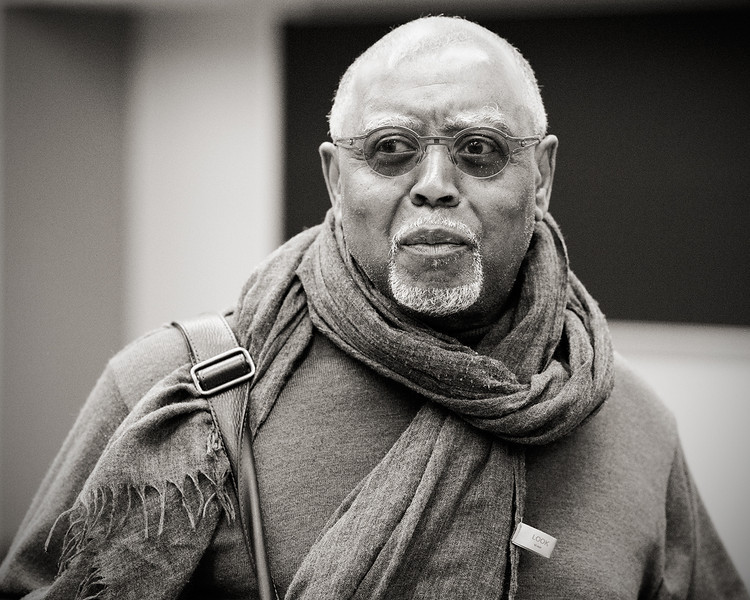
Leonard Harris

Leonard Harris is a professor of philosophy at Purdue University, where he has directed the Philosophy and Literature Ph.D. program and the African American Studies and Research Center. Before Purdue he taught at Morgan State University, a public, historically Black research university in Baltimore, where he created and directed a Philosophy for Children Center as an affiliate of the Institute for the Advancement of Philosophy for Children at Montclair State University. He wrote about his experience introducing philosophy to Washington, D.C. public schools in his book, Children in Chaos: A "Philosophy for Children" Experience (Kendall Hunt, 1991). Before Morgan State, Harris taught at the University of the District of Columbia in Washington, D.C., and at Livingston College, Rutgers University in New Jersey. A leader in the field of critical pragmatism, Harris is one of the most innovative American philosophers of his time. His agenda of "struggle philosophy" moves beyond analytic and instrumentalist reasoning and Socratic dialogue to incorporate an "ethics of insurrection," "advocacy aesthetics," and the concept of racism as "necro-being." In addition, Harris has been largely responsible for the renewed, contemporary interest in the life and philosophy of the American philosopher, and "Dean" of the Harlem Renaissance, Alain LeRoy Locke. Harris is a board member of the Alain L. Locke Society and a founding member of the Philosophy Born of Struggle Association. His most important publications include A Philosophy of Struggle: The Leonard Harris Reader, edited by Lee A. McBride III for Bloomsbury (2020), Philosophy Born of Struggle: Afro-American Philosophy from 1917 (Kendall Hunt 1984/2021), Racism (Humanity Press, 1999), The Critical Pragmatism of Alain Locke (Rowman & Littlefield, 1999), with Jacoby A. Carter, Philosophic Values and World Citizenship: Locke to Obama and Beyond (Lexington Books, 2010), and, with Charles Molesworth, Alain L. Locke: Biography of a Philosopher (University of Chicago Press, 2008). Among Harris's awards are the Herbert Schneider Award "for distinguished contributions to the understanding of American Philosophy" in 2018, the Franz Fanon Lifetime Achievement Award presented by the Caribbean Philosophical Association in 2014, Howard University's 1999 Alain L. Locke Award, given in recognition for pioneering efforts and outstanding contributions to research in Africana Philosophy and Alain Locke Scholarship, and special recognition by the American Philosophical Association in 1996 for outstanding contribution to the profession.

== Honors ==
- Herbert Schneider Award for distinguished contributions to the understanding of American Philosophy, 2018;
- Franz Fanon Lifetime Achievement Award presented by the Caribbean Philosophical Association, 2014;
- William Paterson University's University Distinguished Visiting Professor, 2002–2003;
- Non-resident Fellow, W.E.B. Du Bois Institute for Afro-American Research, Harvard University, 2001–2002;
- Howard University's Alain L. Locke Award, 1999;
- Fulbright Scholar, Addis Ababa University, Ethiopia, 1998–1999;
- American Philosophical Association special recognition for outstanding contribution to the profession, 1996
- Visiting scholar, King's College, Cambridge, UK, visiting scholar, summer 1984,
- Portia Washington Pittman Fellow (named for Portia Pittman), Tuskegee Institute, 1980–81,
- Morton Center for Independent Study, Fellow, 1976–77.

== Bibliography (selected) ==
=== Authored ===
- A Philosophy of Struggle: The Leonard Harris Reader (ed. Lee A. McBride III), Bloomsbury, 2020, 320 pp.
- Alain LeRoy Locke: The Biography of a Philosophy, co-author, C. Molesworth, Chicago University Press, 2008, 448 pp.

=== Edited ===
- Philosophic Values and World Citizenship: Locke to Obama and Beyond (Co-editor with Jacoby A. Carter), Lexington Books, 2010, 266 pp.
- American Philosophies (Co-editor with Anne S. Waters and Scott Pratt), Oxford: Blackwell Publishing Company, 2002, 456 pp.
- Racism, New York: Humanity Books, 1999, 484 pp.
- The Critical Pragmatism of Alain Locke, New York: Rowman & Littlefield Publishers, 1999, 357 pp.
- Children in Chaos: A "Philosophy for Children" Experience, Iowa: Kendall Hunt, 1991, 94 pp.
- The Philosophy of Alain Locke, Harlem Renaissance and Beyond, Philadelphia: Temple University Press, 1989, 332 pp.
- Philosophy Born of Struggle: Afro-American Philosophy from 1917, Iowa: Kendall Hunt Publishing Company, 1984, 316 pp.

== See also ==
- American philosophy
- List of American philosophers
