= Alain LeRoy Locke =

American philosopher and writer (1885–1954)

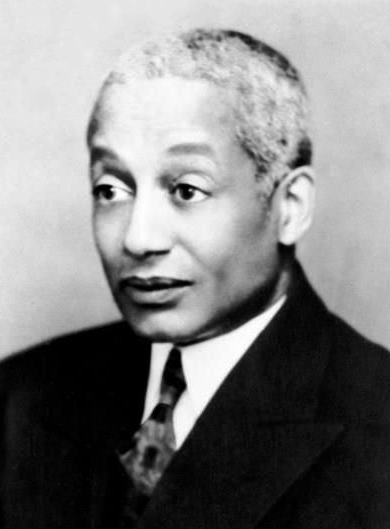
- Born: Arthur Leroy Locke; September 13, 1885; Philadelphia, Pennsylvania, U.S.
- Died: June 9, 1954 (aged 68); New York City, New York, U.S.
- Resting place: Congressional Cemetery
- Education: Harvard University; Hertford College, Oxford; University of Berlin
- Occupations: Writer, philosopher, educator, and patron of the arts
- Writing career
- Language: English

Pennsylvania Historical Marker
- Official name: Alain Leroy Locke (1886–1954)
- Type: City
- Criteria: African American, Education, Professions & Vocations, Writers
- Designated: 1991
- Location: 2221 S 5th St., Philadelphia; 39.92065°N 75.15545°W

Alain LeRoy Locke (/əˈleɪn/; September 13, 1885 – June 9, 1954) was an American writer, philosopher, and educator. Distinguished in 1907 as the first African American Rhodes Scholar, Locke became known as the philosophical architect—the acknowledged "Dean"—of the Harlem Renaissance. He is frequently included in listings of influential African Americans. On March 19, 1968, Martin Luther King Jr. proclaimed: "We're going to let our children know that the only philosophers that lived were not Plato and Aristotle, but W. E. B. Du Bois and Alain Locke came through the universe."

== Early life and education ==
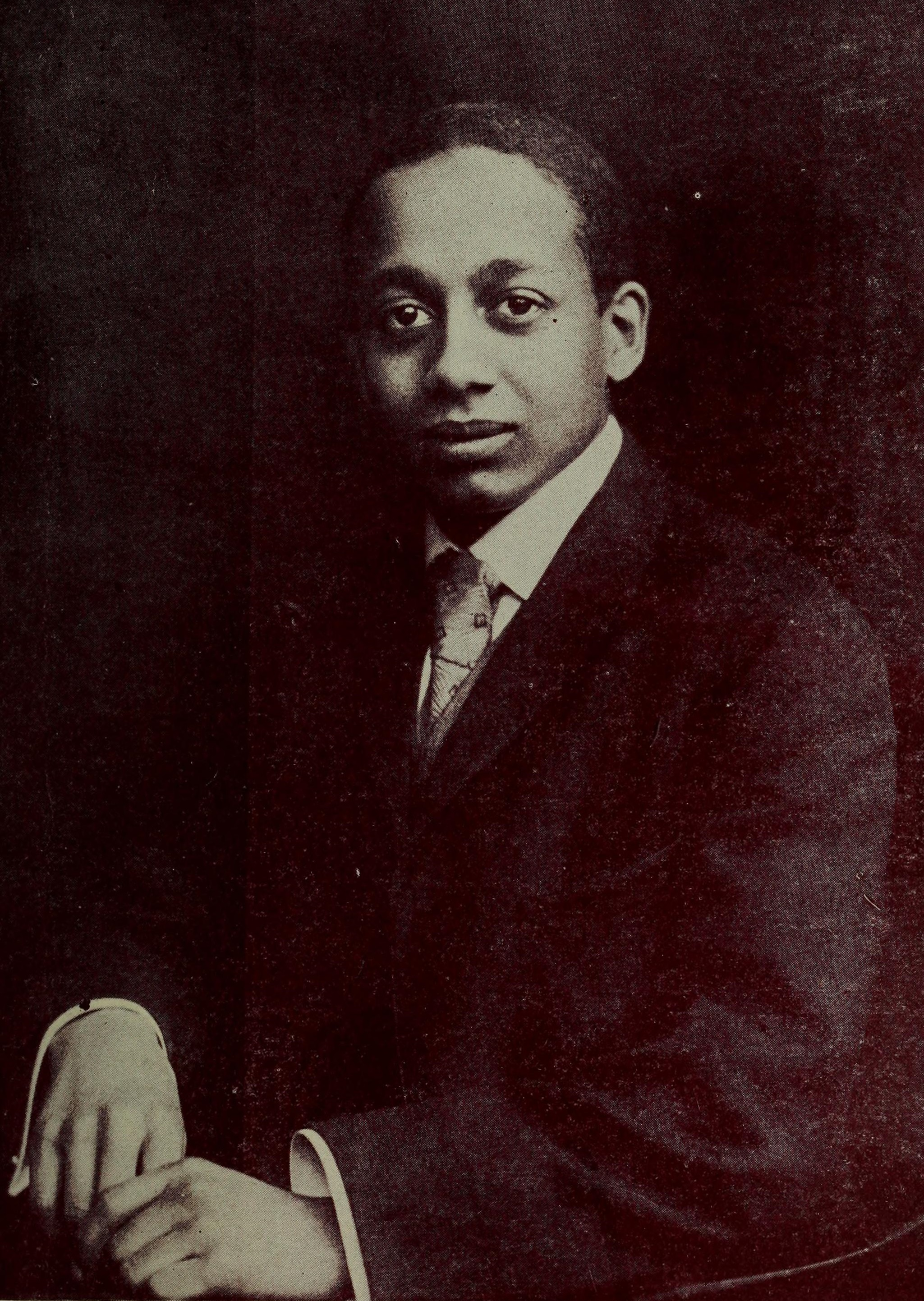
Alain LeRoy Locke, c.1907

He was born Arthur Leroy Locke in Philadelphia, Pennsylvania, on September 13, 1885, to parents Pliny Ishmael Locke (1850–1892) and Mary (née Hawkins) Locke (1853–1922), both of whom were descended from prominent families of free blacks. Called "Roy" as a boy, he was their only surviving child. His father was one of the first black employees of the U.S. Postal Service, and his paternal grandfather taught at Philadelphia's Institute for Colored Youth. His mother Mary was a teacher and inspired Locke's passion for education and literature. Mary's grandfather, Charles Shorter, fought as a soldier and was a hero in the War of 1812.

At the age of 16, Locke chose to use the first name of "Alain". In 1902, Locke graduated from Central High School in Philadelphia, second in his 107th class in the academic institution. He also attended Philadelphia School of Pedagogy.

In 1907, Locke graduated from Harvard University with degrees in English and philosophy; he was honored as a member of Phi Beta Kappa society and recipient of the Bowdoin Prize. That year he was the first African American to be selected as a Rhodes Scholar to the University of Oxford (and the last to be selected until 1963, when John Edgar Wideman and John Stanley Sanders, a future notable writer and politician, respectively, were selected). In the early 20th century, Rhodes selectors did not meet candidates in person, but there is evidence that at least some selectors knew that Locke was African American. On arriving at Oxford, Locke was denied admission to several colleges. Several American Rhodes Scholars from the South refused to live in the same college or attend events with Locke. He was finally admitted to Hertford College, where he studied literature, philosophy, Greek, and Latin, from 1907 to 1910. Alongside his friend and fellow student Pixley ka Isaka Seme, he was part of the Oxford Cosmopolitan Club, contributing to its first publication.

In 1910, he attended the University of Berlin, where he studied philosophy.

Locke wrote from Oxford in 1910 that the "primary aim and obligation" of a Rhodes Scholar

"is to acquire at Oxford and abroad generally a liberal education, and to continue subsequently the Rhodes mission [of international understanding] throughout life and in his own country. If once more it should prove impossible for nations to understand one another as nations, then, as Goethe said, they must learn the Alpha Sigma Port to tolerate each other as individuals".

== Teaching and scholarship ==
Locke received an assistant professorship in English at Howard University in 1912. While at Howard, he became a member of Phi Beta Sigma fraternity.

Locke returned to Harvard in 1916 to work on his doctoral dissertation, The Problem of Classification in the Theory of Value. In his thesis, he discusses the causes of opinions and social biases, and that these are not objectively true or false, and therefore not universal. Locke received his PhD in philosophy in 1918.

Locke returned to Howard University as the chair of the department of philosophy. During this period, he began teaching the first classes on race relations. After working to gain equal pay for African American and white faculty at the university, he was dismissed in 1925.

Following the appointment in 1926 of Mordecai W. Johnson, the first African American president of Howard, Locke was reinstated in 1928 at the university. Beginning in 1935, he returned to philosophy as a topic of his writing. He continued to teach generations of students at Howard until he retired in 1953. Locke Hall, on the Howard campus, is named in his honor. Among his prominent former students is actor Ossie Davis, who said that Locke encouraged him to go to Harlem because of his interest in theatre. And he did.

In addition to teaching philosophy, Locke promoted African American artists, writers, and musicians. He encouraged them to explore Africa and its many cultures as inspiration for their works. He encouraged them to depict African and African American subjects, and to draw on their history for subject material. The library resources built up by Dorothy B. Porter to support these studies included materials which he donated from his travels and contacts.

== Harlem Renaissance and the "New Negro" ==
Locke was the guest editor of the March 1925 issue of the periodical Survey Graphic, for a special edition titled "Harlem, Mecca of the New Negro": about Harlem and the Harlem Renaissance, which helped educate white readers about its flourishing culture. In December of that year, he expanded the issue into The New Negro, a collection of writings by him and other African Americans, which would become one of his best-known works. A landmark in black literature (later acclaimed as the "first national book" of African America), it was an instant success. Locke contributed five essays: the "Foreword", "The New Negro", "Negro Youth Speaks", "The Negro Spirituals", and "The Legacy of Ancestral Arts". This book established his reputation as "a leading African American literary critic and aesthete."

Locke's philosophy of the New Negro was grounded in the concept of race-building; that race is not merely an issue of heredity but is more an issue of society and culture. He raised overall awareness of potential black equality; he said that no longer would blacks allow themselves to adjust or comply with unreasonable white requests. This idea was based on self-confidence and political awareness. Although in the past the laws regarding equality had been ignored without consequence by white America, Locke's philosophical idea of The New Negro allowed for fair treatment. Because this was an idea and not a law, people held its power. If they wanted this idea to flourish, they were the ones who would need to "enforce" it through their actions and overall points of view.

While his own writing was sophisticated philosophy, and therefore not popularly accessible, he mentored other writers in the movement who would become more broadly known, such as Zora Neale Hurston. The "philosophical basis" of the Renaissance has since been widely recognized to originate from Locke.

== Feud with Albert C. Barnes ==
One author whose work Locke edited for both Survey Graphic as well as The New Negro was art collector, critic, and theorist Albert Barnes. Barnes and Locke were connected in their shared views on the importance of Negro art in America. Barnes promulgated notions of the superiority of black art in terms of spirituality and emotion, owing to the collective suffering from which black artists draw to create their work. Locke argued for the primacy of craft objects and the visual tradition as being the greatest contributor of black art to the American canon. The commonalities between the two men's stance on black art led Barnes to believe Locke was stealing his ideas, creating a rift between the two men. Locke touches on his feud with Barnes in his book The Negro in Art.

== Philosophy and religious beliefs ==
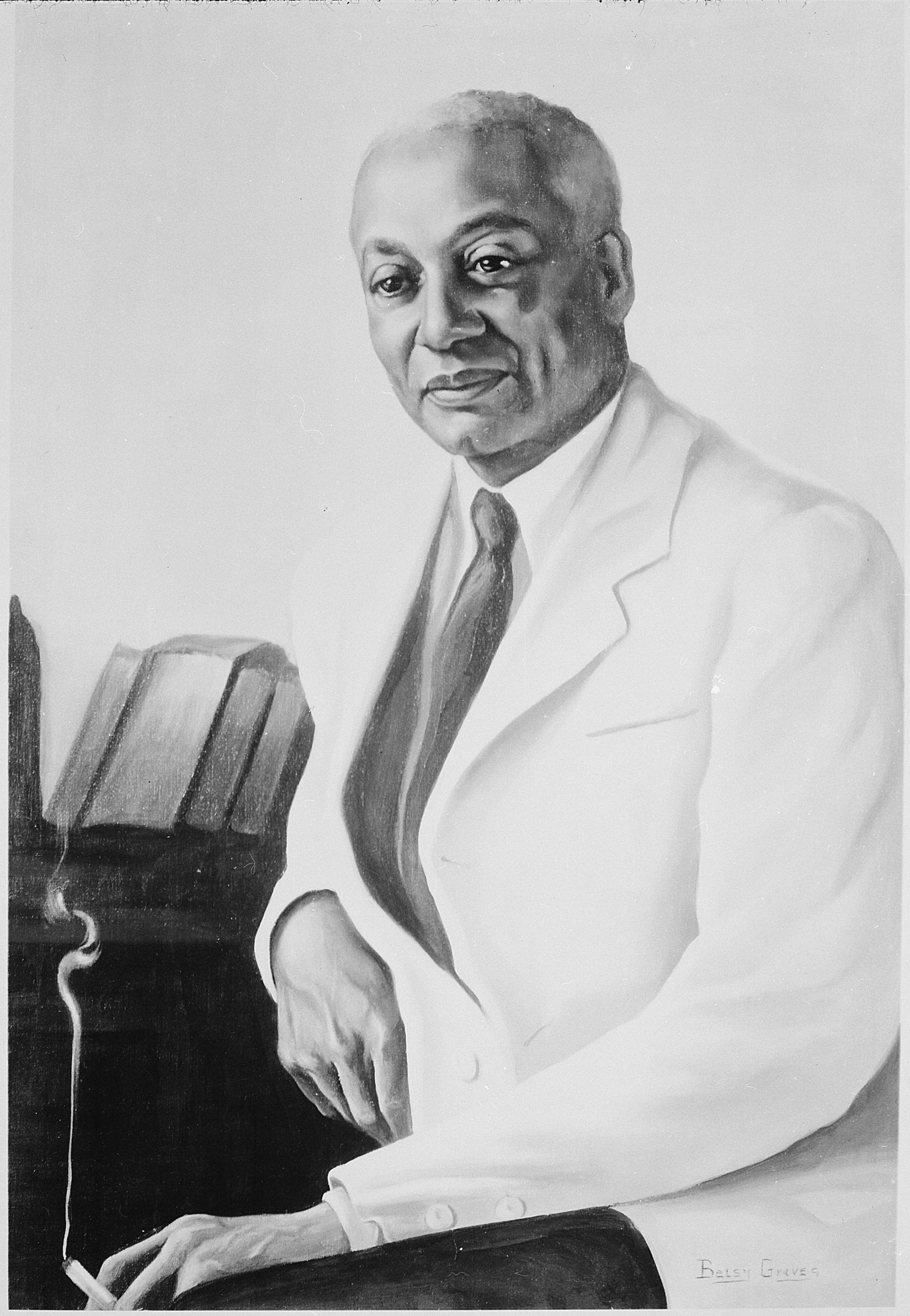
Painting by Betsy Graves Reyneau

Locke belonged to the American philosophical movement known as pragmatism and was considered an originator of cultural pluralism and an advocate of humanism. He is also regarded as an axiologist, or value theorist, interested in ways a democratic society could uplift multiple vibrant cultures and their disparate values.

Locke identified himself as a Baháʼí throughout the second half of his life (1918–1954). He declared his belief in Baháʼu'lláh in the year 1918. Due to the lack of an official enrollment system for the religion, the date when Locke converted to that faith is unverified. However, the National Baháʼí Archives discovered a "Baháʼí Historical Record" card that Locke completed in 1935 for a Baháʼí census from the National Spiritual Assembly. He was one of seven African American members from the Washington, D.C. Baháʼí movement to complete the card. On the card, Locke wrote the year 1918 as the year he was accepted into the Baháʼí Faith, and wrote Washington, D.C., as the place he was accepted. It was common to write to ʻAbdu'l-Bahá to declare one's new faith, and Locke received a letter, or "tablet", from ʻAbdu'l-Bahá in return.

When ʻAbdu'l-Bahá died in 1921, Locke enjoyed a close relationship with Shoghi Effendi, then head of the Baháʼí Faith. Shoghi Effendi is reported to have said to Locke, "People as you, Mr. Gregory, Dr. Esslemont and some other dear souls are as rare as diamond." He is among some 40 African Americans known to have joined the religion during the ministry of ʻAbdu'l-Bahá before the leader's death in later 1921.

== Sexual orientation ==
Locke was homosexual, and may have encouraged and supported other gay African Americans who were part of the Harlem Renaissance. Given the discriminatory laws against it, he was not fully open about his orientation. He referred to it as the "vulnerable/invulnerable Achilles heel of homosexuality", meaning an area of both risk and strength.

== Death, influence and legacy ==
After his retirement from Howard University in 1953, Locke moved to New York City. He had heart disease. Following a six-week illness, he died at Mount Sinai Hospital on June 9, 1954. During his illness, he was cared for by his friend and protégée, Margaret Just Butcher.

Butcher used notes from Locke's unfinished work to write The Negro in American Culture (1956).

=== Journey of ashes ===
Locke was cremated, and his remains given to Dr. Arthur Fauset, Locke's close friend and executor of his estate. He was an anthropologist who was a major figure in the Harlem Renaissance. After Fauset died in 1983, and the remains were given to his friend, Reverend Sadie Mitchell, who ministered at African Episcopal Church of St. Thomas in Philadelphia. Mitchell retained the ashes until the mid-1990s, when she asked Dr. J. Weldon Norris, a professor of music at Howard University, to take the ashes to the university.

The ashes were held at Howard University's Moorland–Spingarn Research Center until 2007. That year they were discovered when two former Rhodes scholars were working on the Centennial of Locke's selection as a Rhodes Scholar. Concerned that the human remains were not properly cared for, the university transferred them to its W. Montague Cobb Research Laboratory, which had extensive experience handling human remains (and had worked on those from the African Burial Ground in New York). Locke's ashes, which had been stored in a plain paper bag in a simple round metal container, were transferred to a small funerary urn and locked in a safe.

Howard University officials initially considered having Locke's ashes buried in a niche at Locke Hall on the Howard campus, as the ashes of Langston Hughes had been interred in 1991 at the Schomburg Center for Research in Black Culture in New York City. But Kurt Schmoke, the university's legal counsel, was concerned about setting a precedent that might lead to too many people trying to gain burials at the university. After reviewing legal issues, university officials decided to bury the remains off-site. They thought to bury Locke beside his mother, Mary Hawkins Locke. However, Howard officials quickly discovered a problem: she had been interred at Columbian Harmony Cemetery in Washington, D.C., but that cemetery closed in 1959. Her remains and others from that cemetery were transferred to National Harmony Memorial Park. (She and 37,000 other unclaimed remains from Columbian Harmony were buried in a mass grave, with no markers.)

University officials eventually decided to bury Alain Locke's remains at historic Congressional Cemetery in Washington, DC. Former African American Rhodes Scholars raised $8,000 to purchase a burial plot there. Locke was interred at Congressional Cemetery on September 13, 2014. His tombstone reads:

1885–1954

Herald of the Harlem Renaissance

Exponent of Cultural Pluralism

On the back of the headstone is a nine-pointed Baháʼí star (representing Locke's religious beliefs); a Zimbabwe Bird, emblem of the nation Locke adopted as a Rhodes Scholar; a lambda, symbol of the gay rights movement; and the logo of Phi Beta Sigma, the fraternity Locke joined. In the center of these four symbols is an Art Deco representation of an African woman's face set against the rays of the sun. This image is a simplified version of the bookplate that Harlem Renaissance painter Aaron Douglas designed for Locke. Below the bookplate image are the words "Teneo te, Africa" ("I hold you, my Africa"). This represented Locke's belief that African Americans needed to study African culture to enlarge their sense of self.

=== Influence, legacy and honors ===
- At Howard University, the main building for the College of Arts and Sciences is dedicated to his legacy, and was named "Alain Locke Hall". His personal and literary papers are held within the manuscript department in the university's Moorland-Spingarn Research Center.
- Locke's former residence on R Street NW in Washington's Logan Circle neighborhood is marked with a historical plaque.
- In 2002, scholar Molefi Kete Asante listed Locke among his 100 Greatest African Americans. Similarly, Columbus Salley's book, The Black 100, included Locke, ranking him as the 36th most influential African American.
- In 2019, Jeffrey Stewart won a Pulitzer Prize in Biography for The New Negro: the Life of Alain Locke.
- In 2020, Rhodes Scholar and attorney Dr. Ann Olivarius wrote a guest column in The Financial Times suggesting that statues of Locke and Zambian civil-rights activist Lucy Banda-Sichone replace the statue of Cecil Rhodes at Oriel College, Oxford University.

Schools named after Locke include:

- Alain L. Locke Elementary School PS 208/now PS 185, The Locke School of Arts and Engineering in South Harlem
- The Locke High School in Los Angeles, California
- The Alain Locke Public School, an elementary school in West Philadelphia
- Alain Locke Charter Academy in Chicago. Illinois
- Alain Locke Elementary School in Gary, Indiana

=== Major works ===
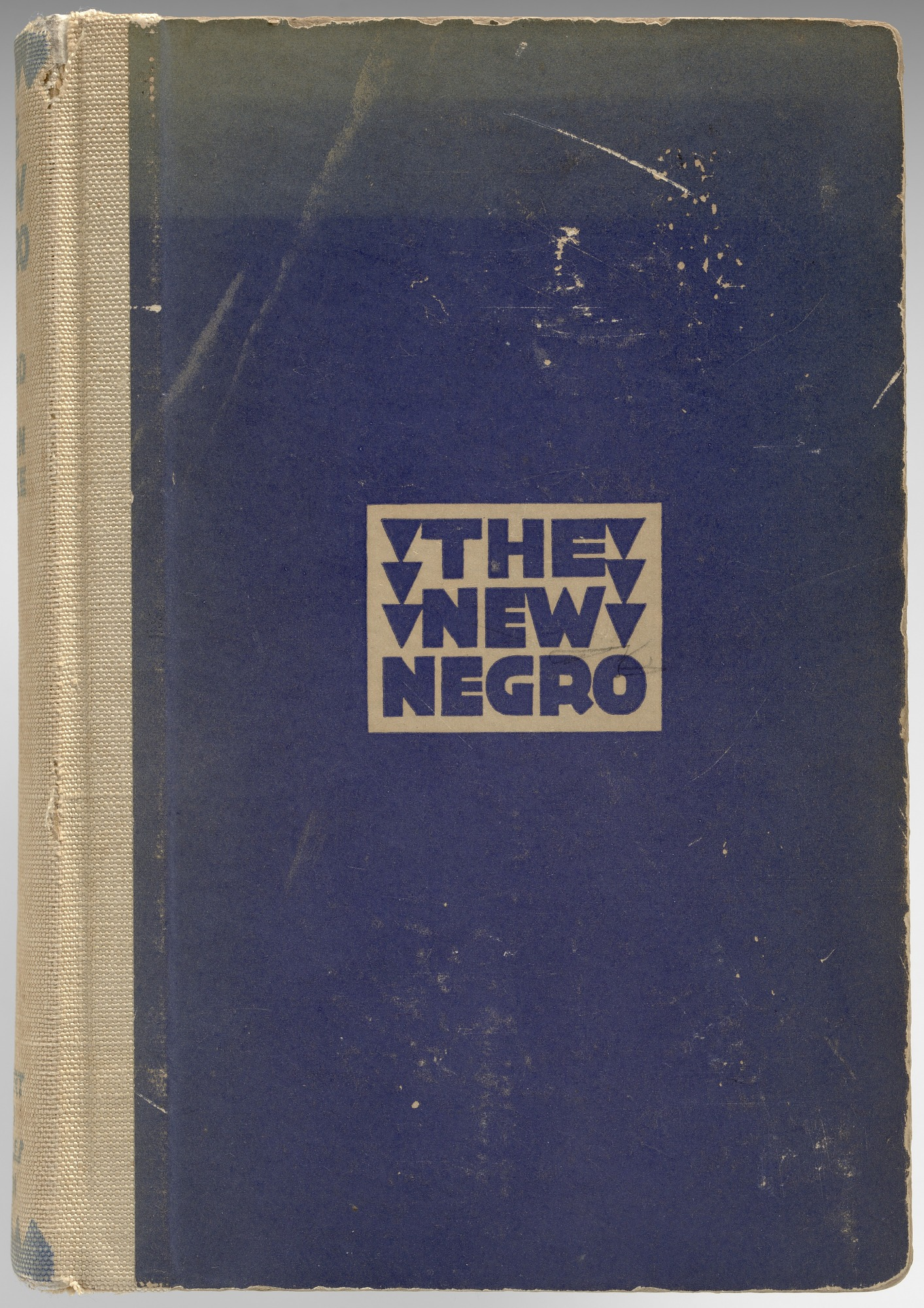
First edition of The New Negro (1925)

In addition to the books listed below, Locke edited the "Bronze Booklet" series, a set of eight volumes published in the 1930s by Associates in Negro Folk Education. He regularly published reviews of poetry and literature by African Americans in journals such as Opportunity and Phylon. His works include:

- The New Negro: An Interpretation. New York: Albert and Charles Boni, 1925.
- Harlem: Mecca of the New Negro. Survey Graphic 6.6 (March 1, 1925).
- When Peoples Meet: A Study of Race and Culture Contacts. Alain Locke and Bernhard J. Stern (eds). New York: Committee on Workshops, Progressive Education Association, 1942.
- The Philosophy of Alain Locke: Harlem Renaissance and Beyond. Edited by Leonard Harris. Philadelphia: Temple University Press, 1989.
- Race Contacts and Interracial Relations: Lectures of the Theory and Practice of Race. Washington, D.C.: Howard University Press, 1916. Reprinted, edited by Jeffery C. Stewart. Washington: Howard University Press, 1992.
- Negro Art Past and Present. Washington: Associates in Negro Folk Education, 1936 (Bronze Booklet No. 3).
- The Negro and His Music. Washington: Associates in Negro Folk Education, 1936 (Bronze Booklet No. 2).
- "The Negro in the Three Americas". Journal of Negro Education 14 (Winter 1944): 7–18.
- "Negro Spirituals". Freedom: A Concert in Celebration of the 75th Anniversary of the Thirteenth Amendment to the Constitution of the United States (1940). Compact disc. New York: Bridge, 2002. Audio (1:14).
- "Spirituals" (1940). The Critical Temper of Alain Locke: A Selection of His Essays on Art and Culture. Edited by Jeffrey C. Stewart. New York and London: Garland, 1983, pp. 123–26.
- The New Negro: An Interpretation. New York: Arno Press, 1925.
- Four Negro Poets. New York: Simon and Schuster, 1927.
- Plays of Negro Life: a Source-Book of Native American Drama. New York: Harper and Brothers, 1927.
- A Decade of Negro Self-Expression. Charlottesville, Virginia, 1928.
- The Negro in America. Chicago: American Library Association, 1933.
- Negro Art – Past and Present. Washington, D.C.: Associates in Negro Folk Education, 1936.
- The Negro and His Music. Washington, D.C.: Associates in Negro Folk Education, 1936; also New York: Kennikat Press, 1936.
- The Negro in Art: A Pictorial Record of the Negro Artist and of the Negro Theme in Art. Washington, D.C.: Associates in Negro Folk Education, 1940; also New York: Hacker Art Books, 1940.
- "A Collection of Congo Art". Arts 2 (February 1927): 60–70.
- "Harlem: Dark Weather-vane". Survey Graphic 25 (August 1936): 457–462, 493–495.
- "The Negro and the American Stage". Theatre Arts Monthly 10 (February 1926): 112–120.
- "The Negro in Art". Christian Education 13 (November 1931): 210–220.
- "Negro Speaks for Himself". The Survey 52 (April 15, 1924): 71–72.
- "The Negro's Contribution to American Art and Literature". The Annals of the American Academy of Political and Social Science 140 (November 1928): 234–247.
- "The Negro's Contribution to American Culture". Journal of Negro Education 8 (July 1939): 521–529.
- "A Note on African Art". Opportunity 2 (May 1924): 134–138.
- "Our Little Renaissance". Ebony and Topaz, edited by Charles S. Johnson. New York: National Urban League, 1927.
- "Steps Towards the Negro Theatre". Crisis 25 (December 1922): 66–68.
- The Problem of Classification in the Theory of Value: or an Outline of a Genetic System of Values. PhD dissertation: Harvard, 1917.
- "Locke, Alain". [Autobiographical sketch.] Twentieth Century Authors. Edited by Stanley Kunitz and Howard Haycroft. New York: 1942, p. 837.
- "The Negro Group". Group Relations and Group Antagonisms. Edited by Robert M. MacIver. New York: Institute for Religious Studies, 1943.
- World View on Race and Democracy: A Study Guide in Human Group Relations. Chicago: American Library Association, 1943.
- Le Rôle du nègre dans la culture des Amériques. Port-au-Prince: Haiti Imprimerie de l'état, 1943.
- "Values and Imperatives". In Sidney Hook and Horace M. Kallen (eds), American Philosophy, Today and Tomorrow. New York: Lee Furman, 1935, pp. 312–33. Reprinted: Freeport, NY: Books for Libraries Press, 1968; Harris, The Philosophy of Alain Locke, 31–50.
- "Pluralism and Ideological Peace". In Milton R. Konvitz and Sidney Hook (eds), Freedom and Experience: Essays Presented to Horace M. Kallen. Ithaca: New School for Research and Cornell University Press, 1947, pp. 63–69.
- "Cultural Relativism and Ideological Peace". In Lyman Bryson, Louis Finfelstein, and R. M. MacIver (eds), Approaches to World Peace. New York: Harper & Brothers, 1944, pp. 609–618. Reprinted in The Philosophy of Alain Locke, 67–78.
- "Pluralism and Intellectual Democracy". Conference on Science, Philosophy and Religion, Second Symposium. New York: Conference on Science, Philosophy and Religion, 1942, pp. 196–212. Reprinted in The Philosophy of Alain Locke, 51–66.
- "The Unfinished Business of Democracy". Survey Graphic 31 (November 1942): 455–61.
- "Democracy Faces a World Order". Harvard Educational Review 12.2 (March 1942): 121–28.
- "The Moral Imperatives for World Order". Summary of Proceedings, Institute of International Relations, Mills College, Oakland, CA, June 18–28, 1944, 19–20. Reprinted in The Philosophy of Alain Locke, 143, 151–152.
- "Major Prophet of Democracy". Review of Race and Democratic Society by Franz Boas. Journal of Negro Education 15.2 (Spring 1946): 191–92.
- "Ballad for Democracy". Opportunity: Journal of Negro Life 18:8 (August 1940): 228–29.
- Three Corollaries of Cultural Relativism. Proceedings of the Second Conference on the Scientific and the Democratic Faith. New York, 1941.
- "Reason and Race". Phylon 8:1 (1947): 17–27. Reprinted in Jeffrey C. Stewart, ed. The Critical Temper of Alain Locke: A Selection of His Essays on Art and Culture. New York and London: Garland, 1983, pp. 319–27.
- "Values That Matter". Review of The Realms of Value, by Ralph Barton Perry. Key Reporter 19.3 (1954): 4.
- "Is There a Basis for Spiritual Unity in the World Today?" Town Meeting: Bulletin of America's Town Meeting on the Air 8.5 (June 1, 1942): 3–12.
- "Unity through Diversity: A Bahá'í Principle". The Baháʼí World: A Biennial International Record, Vol. IV, 1930–1932. Wilmette: Baháʼí Publishing Trust, 1989 [1933]. Reprinted in Locke 1989, 133–138. Note: Leonard Harris's reference (Locke 1989, 133 n.) should be amended to read, Volume IV, 1930–1932 (not "V, 1932–1934").
- "Lessons in World Crisis". The Baháʼí World: A Biennial International Record, Vol. IX, 1940–1944. Wilmette: Baháʼí Publishing Trust, 1945. Reprint, Wilmette: Baháʼí Publishing Trust, 1980 [1945].
- "The Orientation of Hope". The Baháʼí World: A Biennial International Record, Vol. V, 1932–1934. Wilmette: Baháʼí Publishing Trust, 1936. Reprint in Locke 1989, 129–132. Note: Leonard Harris's reference (Locke 1989, 129 n.) should be amended to read, "Volume V, 1932–1934" (not "Volume IV, 1930–1932").
- "A Baháʼí Inter-Racial Conference". The Baháʼí Magazine (Star of the West), 18.10 (January 1928): 315–16.
- "Educator and Publicist", Star of the West 22.8 (November 1931), 254–55. Obituary of George William Cook [Baha'i], 1855–1931.
- "Impressions of Haifa". [Appreciation of Baha'i leader, Shoghi Effendi, whom Locke met during his first of two Baha'i pilgrimages to Haifa, Palestine (now Israel)]. Star of the West 15.1 (1924): 13–14; Alaine [sic] Locke, "Impressions of Haifa", in Baháʼí Year Book, Vol. One, April 1925 – April 1926, comp. National Spiritual Assembly of the Bahá'ís of the United States and Canada (New York: Baháʼí Publishing Committee, 1926), 81, 83; Alaine [sic] Locke, "Impressions of Haifa", in The Baháʼí World: A Biennial International Record, Vol. II, April 1926 – April 1928, comp. National Spiritual Assembly of the Baháʼís of the United States and Canada (New York: Bahá'í Publishing Committee, 1928; reprint, Wilmette: Baháʼí Publishing Trust, 1980), 125, 127; Alain Locke, "Impressions of Haifa", in The Bahá'í World: A Biennial International Record, Vol. III, April 1928 – April 1930, comp. National Spiritual Assembly of the Bahá'ís of the United States and Canada (New York: Baháʼí Publishing Committee, 1930; reprint, Wilmette: Baháʼí Publishing Trust, 1980), 280, 282.
- "Minorities and the Social Mind". Progressive Education 12 (March 1935): 141–50.
- The High Cost of Prejudice. Forum 78 (December 1927).
- The Negro Poets of the United States. Anthology of Magazine Verse 1926 and Yearbook of American Poetry. Sesquicentennial edition. Ed. William S. Braithwaite. Boston: B.J. Brimmer, 1926, pp. 143–151.
- The Critical Temper of Alain Locke: A Selection of His Essays on Art and Culture. Edited by Jeffrey C. Stewart. New York and London: Garland, 1983, pp. 43–45.
- Plays of Negro Life: A Source-Book of Native American Drama. Alain Locke and Montgomery Davis (eds). New York and Evanston: Harper and Row, 1927. "Decorations and Illustrations by Aaron Douglas".
- "Impressions of Luxor". The Howard Alumnus 2.4 (May 1924): 74–78.

=== Posthumous works ===
Alain Locke's previously unpublished, posthumous works include:

Locke, Alain. "The Moon Maiden" and "Alain Locke in His Own Words: Three Essays". World Order 36.3 (2005): 37–48. Edited, introduced and annotated by Christopher Buck and Betty J. Fisher.

Four previously unpublished works by Alain Locke:

- "The Moon Maiden" (37) [a love poem for a white woman who left him];
- "The Gospel for the Twentieth Century" (39–42);
- "Peace between Black and White in the United States" (42–45);
- "Five Phases of Democracy" (45–48).

Locke, Alain. "Alain Locke: Four Talks Redefining Democracy, Education, and World Citizenship". Edited, introduced and annotated by Christopher Buck and Betty J. Fisher. World Order 38.3 (2006/2007): 21–41.

Four previously unpublished speeches/essays by Alain Locke:

- "The Preservation of the Democratic Ideal" (1938 or 1939);
- "Stretching Our Social Mind" (1944);
- "On Becoming World Citizens" (1946);
- "Creative Democracy" (1946 or 1947).

== See also ==
- Harlem Renaissance
- American philosophy
- List of American philosophers
- Leonard Harris
- Jeffrey C. Stewart
- The New Negro: The Life of Alain Locke
- List of people from Harlem
