= History of African Americans in Philadelphia =

African Americans in Philadelphia
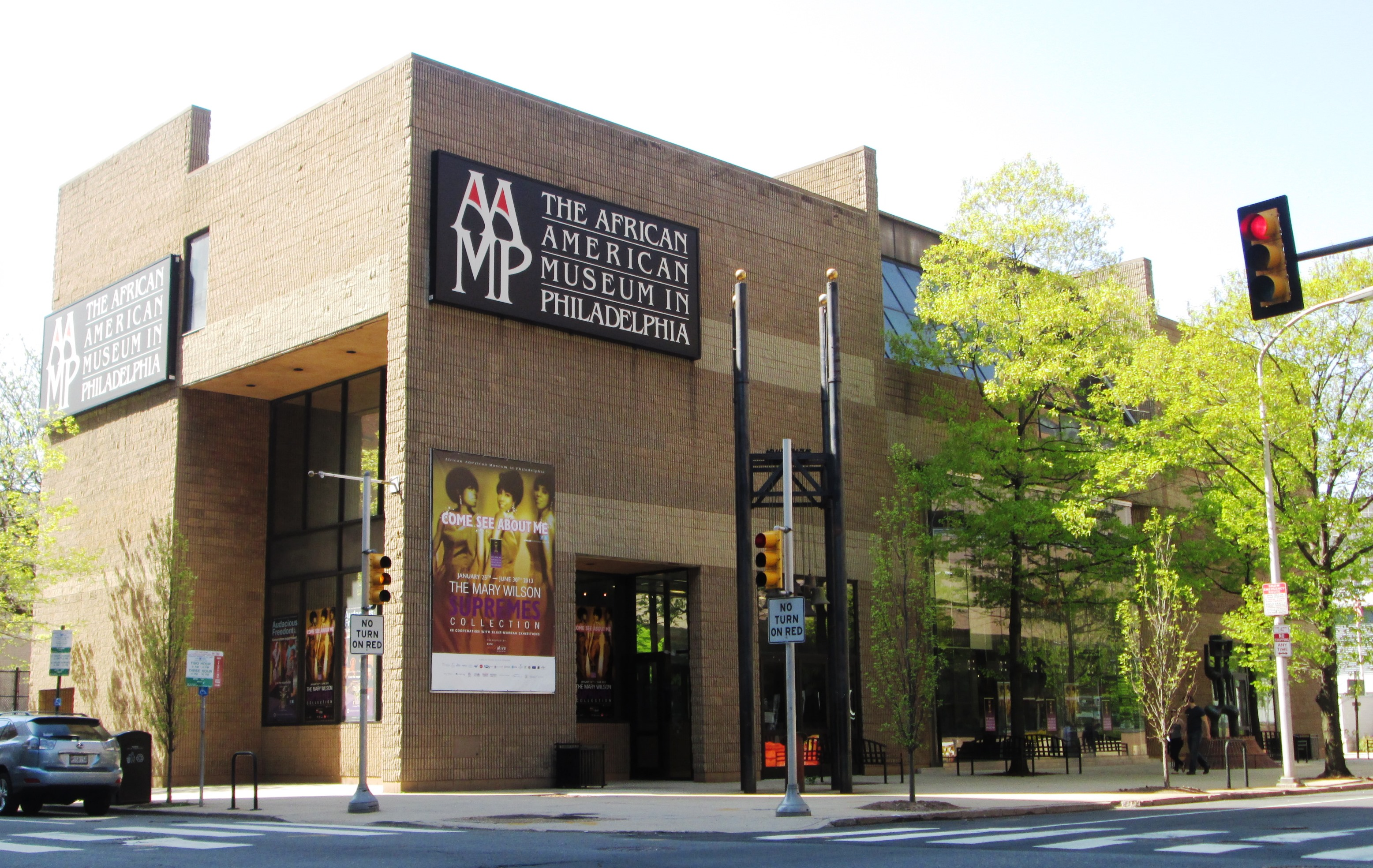
- African American Museum in Philadelphia

Total population
- 1,256,908

Regions with significant populations
- North Philadelphia west of Germantown Avenue, Point Breeze in South Philadelphia, West Philadelphia and parts of Southwest Philadelphia

Languages
- Philadelphia English, African-American Vernacular English, African languages

Religion
- Christianity (Mainly Historically Black Protestant), Islam, Irreligion

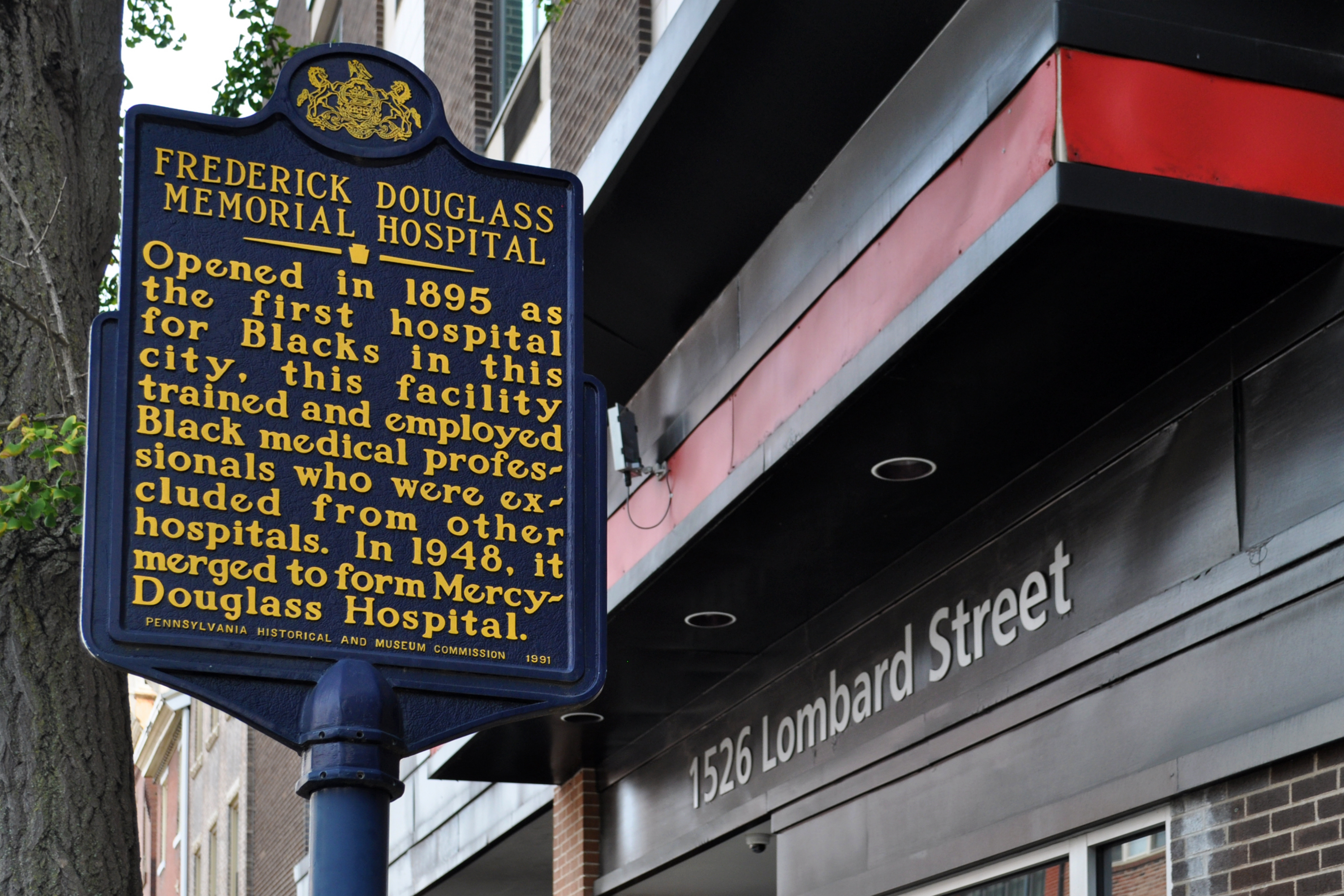
First Black Hospital in Philadelphia

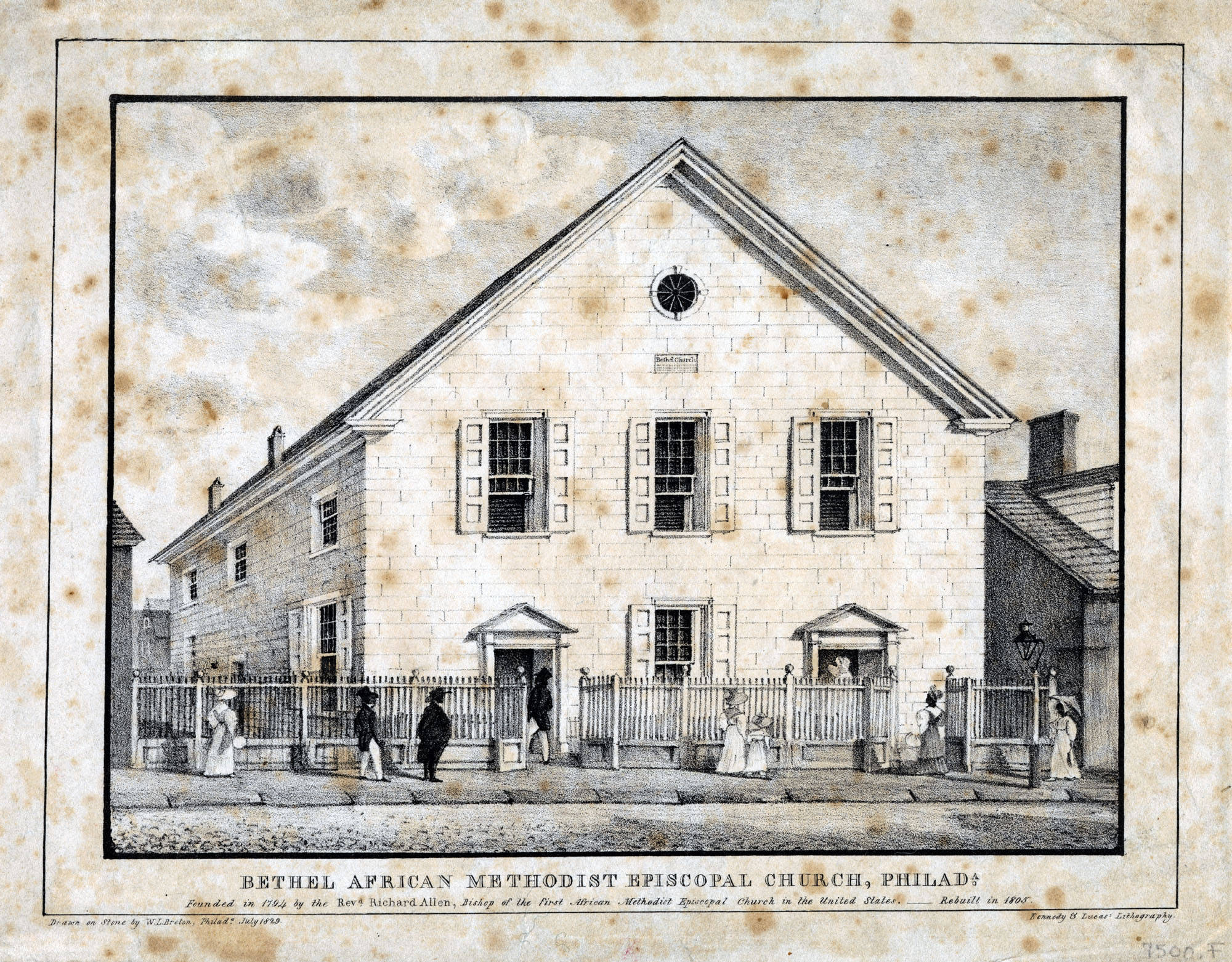
African American church in Philadelphia

The history of African Americans or Black Philadelphians in the city of Philadelphia, Pennsylvania has been documented in various sources. People of African descent are currently the largest ethnic group in Philadelphia. Estimates in 2010 by the U.S. Census Bureau documented the total number of people living in Philadelphia who identified as Black or African American at 644,287, or 42.2% of the city's total population.

Originally arriving in the 17th century as enslaved Africans, the population of African Americans in Philadelphia grew during the 18th and 19th centuries to include numerous free Black residents who were active in the abolitionist movement and as conductors in the Underground Railroad. During the 20th and 21st centuries, Black Philadelphians actively campaigned against discrimination and continued to contribute to Philadelphia's cultural, economic and political life as workers, activists, artists, musicians, and politicians.

Between the 1920s and 1940s, North, West, and South Philadelphia saw an increase of the Black population when white flight occurred in Philadelphia. More than 50,000 African immigrants live in the Philadelphia metro area. Most of them are from Ethiopia, Nigeria, Ghana, and Liberia.

== History ==
=== 1639 to 1800 ===
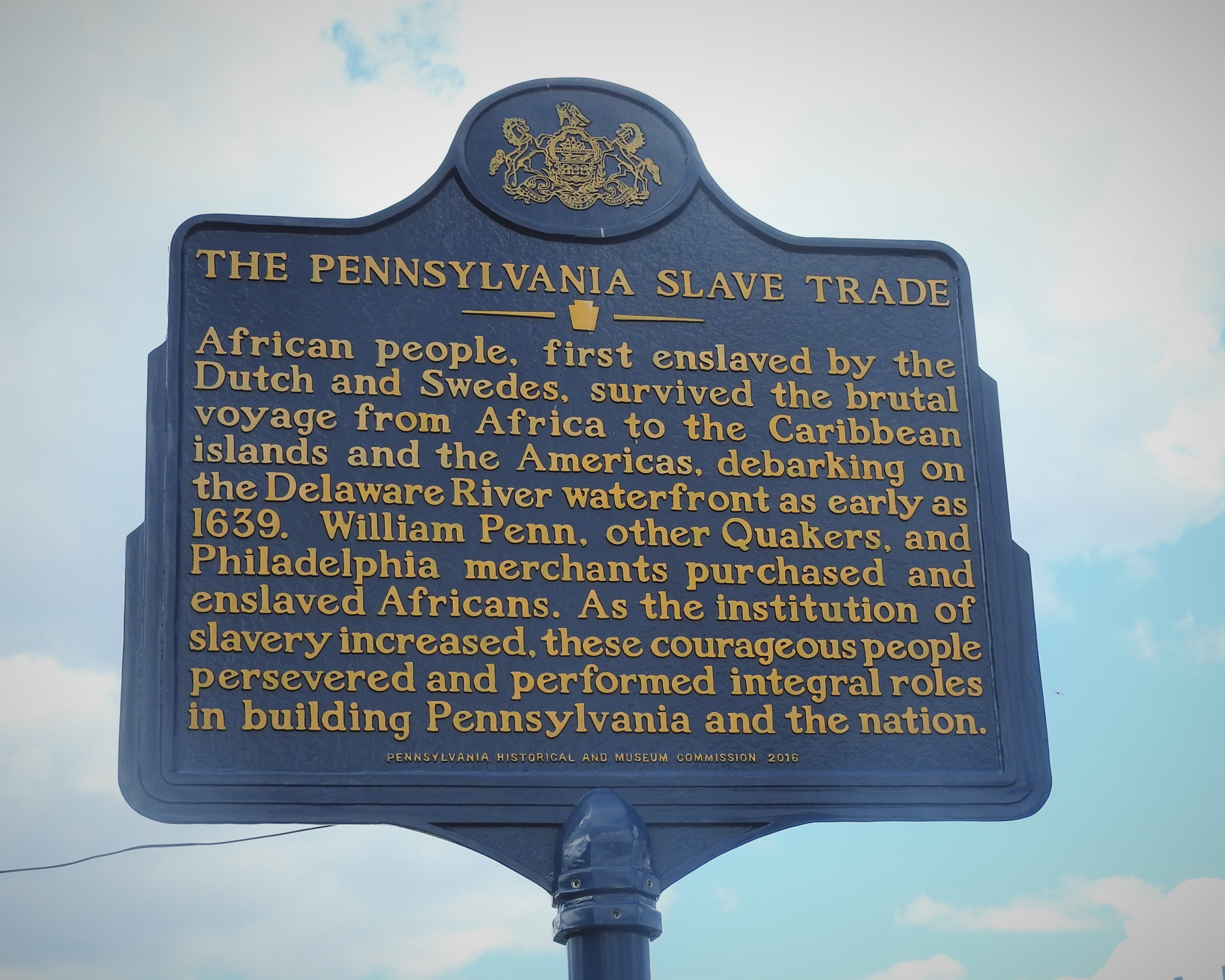
Slave trade market in Philadelphia

Enslaved Africans arrived in the area that became Philadelphia as early as 1639, brought by European settlers. When the slave trade increased due to a shortage of European workers during the 1750s and 1760s, approximately one to five hundred Africans were sent to Philadelphia each year. In 1765, there were roughly fifteen hundred Black Philadelphians; of these, one hundred were free. By the time the American Revolution broke out in 1775, enslaved individuals were one-twelfth of the roughly sixteen thousand people who lived in Philadelphia.

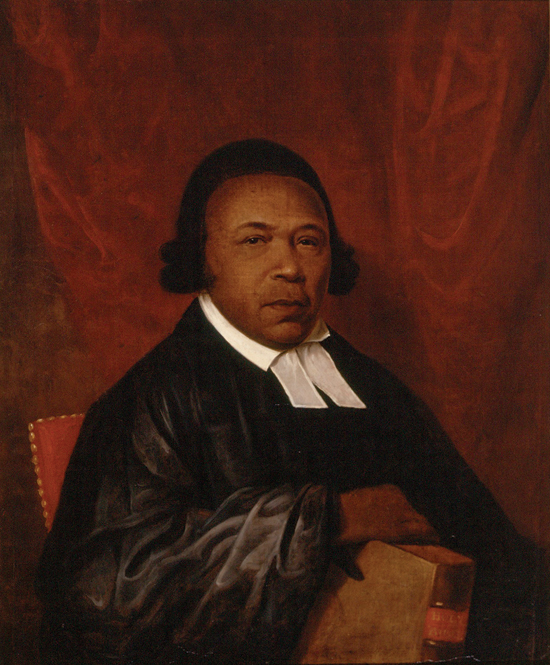
Absalom Jones, founder of the Free African Society

Black people served on both the Loyalist and Patriot sides during the American Revolution. Two of the individuals supporting the Patriot side were Cyrus Bustill, who worked as a ship's baker during the Revolution and later became a prominent Philadelphia businessman and activist, and James Forten, who served on a privateer at the age of fourteen and became a wealthy sailmaker and abolitionist.

The Pennsylvania Abolition Society was founded by white Quakers in 1775 and eventually became a biracial organization. In 1780, a policy of gradual emancipation was instituted in Pennsylvania. During this period, enslaved people were freed through manumission; others managed to escape or buy their own freedom. By 1783, the free Black community in Philadelphia surpassed one thousand residents, while four hundred residents remained enslaved.

Richard Allen and Absolom Jones founded the Free African Society in 1787, a mutual aid society, and Allen, with his wife Sarah Allen, established the Bethel African Methodist Church in 1794. During the 1793 Philadelphia Yellow Fever Epidemic, Black residents were mistakenly believed to be immune to the disease, so they worked as carriers of the dead and tended to the sick and dying inside their homes. Kidnapping of free Black residents to be sold back into slavery was a risk that continued into the 19th century, especially for children.

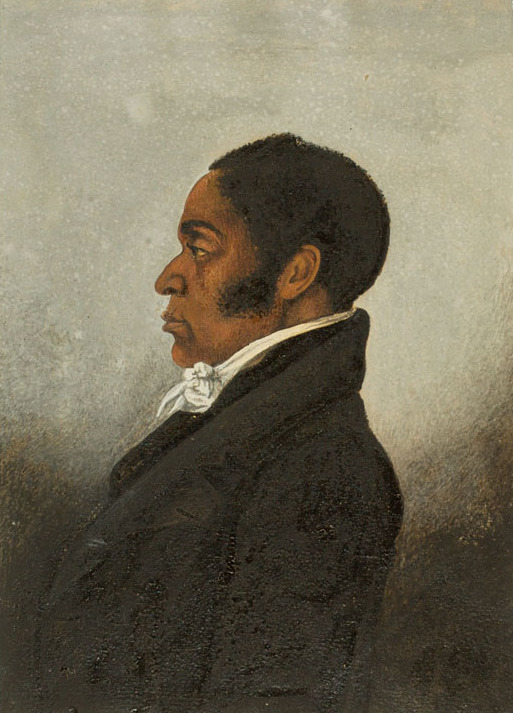
James Forten funded the abolitionist newspaper the Liberator

The Quakers established a Burying Place For All Free Negroes or People of Color in Byberry Township. This African Burial Ground remains an obscure anomaly, largely forgotten today although it was placed on the Philadelphia Register of Historic Places.

Most of the Black population in Philadelphia were living as freemen and women by 1811, although some remained enslaved until the 1840s. The free community was joined by runaways from the South and refugees from the Haitian Revolution.

=== 1800 to Civil War ===
The growing free Black community was instrumental in making Philadelphia a hotbed of abolitionism by the 1830s. Wealthy Black entrepreneur James Forten gave white abolitionist William Lloyd Garrison funding so he could start the anti-slavery newspaper The Liberator and contributed articles to it. In 1818, a group of African Americans led by Derrick Johnson attempted to organize a volunteer fire company under the name African Fire Association. The effort was abandoned after opposition from white fire companies, members of the public, and some prominent Black leaders, including James Forten. Black activists were founders and members of the national biracial group the American Anti-Slavery Society, created in Philadelphia in 1833, and the Pennsylvania Anti-Slavery Society, created in 1838. In December 1833, after women were excluded from the American Anti-Slavery Society, a group of black and white women, which included Cyril Bustil's daughter Grace Douglass, and James Forten's daughters, Sarah, Harriet and Margaretta launched the Philadelphia Female Anti-Slavery Society (PFASS).

While some African Americans in Philadelphia worked in professional jobs that catered to the Black community like teachers, doctors, ministers, barbers, caterers, and entrepreneurs, most Black Philadelphians at that time worked at physically demanding and low-paying jobs. They competed with working class whites, especially new Irish immigrants, for jobs, which led to racial conflict. In 1834, a race riot broke out at a local tavern that was popular with both black and white Philadelphians. A white mob attacked Black homes, businesses, and churches. In 1838, another white mob attacked Pennsylvania Hall, where black and white abolitionists were meeting, and burned it down. Also in 1838, Pennsylvania's newly ratified constitution officially disfranchised African Americans. In 1842, white mobs again attacked blacks during the Lombard Street Riots.

Despite the risks and racism they encountered, African-Americans continued to come to Philadelphia, since it was the closest major city to the Southern States, where slavery was still legal. In the years leading up to the Civil War, Philadelphia had the largest black population outside the slave states. There were 15,000 black Philadelphians in 1830, 20,000 by 1850, and 22,000 by 1860. Most lived in South Philadelphia near what is today Center City, but there were smaller populations in Northern Liberties, Kensington, and Spring Garden. They came because of Philadelphia's reputation as a thriving political, cultural, and economic center for African Americans.

The city was also a major stop on the Underground Railroad, especially for slaves escaping through Maryland and Delaware. Robert Purvis, president of the biracial Pennsylvania Anti-Slavery Society from 1845 to 1850, was also chairman of the General Vigilance Committee from 1852 to 1857, which gave direct aid to fugitive slaves. With his wife Harriet Forten Purvis, he worked as a conductor of the Underground Railroad. Purvis estimated that from 1831 to 1861, they helped one slave per day achieve freedom, assisting more than 9,000 slaves to escape to the North. They used their own house, then located outside the city, in Byberry Township, as a place where fugitives could hide. Purvis built Byberry Hall across the street from his home, on the edge of the Quaker-owned Byberry Friends Meeting campus, to host anti-slavery speakers. It still stands today.

=== Civil War to 1900 ===
During the Civil War, eleven African American Philadelphia regiments fought for the North, after the passage of the 1862 Second Militia Act allowing blacks to be enlist in the Army.

After the Civil War, African Americans in Philadelphia, including Octavius V. Catto (1839–1871), organized to end segregation of the city's schools and streetcars and regain the right to vote. Their efforts paid off; in 1867, streetcar segregation was ended throughout the state, and legal segregation of schools ended in 1881 (although de facto segregation continued into the 20th century). The Fifteenth Amendment to the U.S. Constitution gave Pennsylvania Black Americans the right to vote in 1870. But Catto himself was shot and killed while trying to cast his ballot in 1871.

In 1879, painter Henry Ossawa Tanner enrolled as the first African American student at the Pennsylvania Academy of Fine Arts. After travels abroad, he would return to Philadelphia in 1893 to paint his most famous work, The Banjo Lesson. Also in 1893, Philadelphia high school student Meta Vaux Warrick Fuller created an art project that was included in The World's Columbian Exposition in Chicago and led to her future success as a multi-disciplinary artist.

The Black population rose to nearly 32,000 in 1880. In 1884, there were approximately 300 black-owned businesses, including the Philadelphia Tribune (started in 1884) and Douglas Hospital (opened in 1895). By 1900, the Black population at 63,000 people, had nearly doubled.

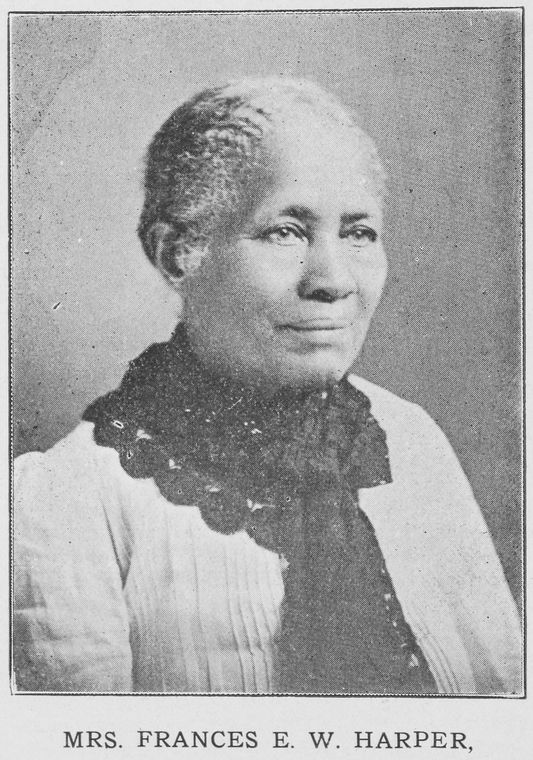
Poet, suffragist and abolitionist Frances Harper

In 1896, Philadelphia poet, suffragist, and abolitionist Frances Harper helped found the National Association of Colored Women and served as its vice president. By then, she had already had a long career as a published writer, including works like her poem Bury Me In a Free Land, Sketches of Southern Life, and the novel Iola Leroy.

Published in 1899 by the University of Pennsylvania and conducted by W. E. B. Du Bois, The Philadelphia Negro: A Social Study was the first sociological race study of the African American community in the United States. The aim of the social study was to identify "The Negro Problems of Philadelphia," the problems facing black communities not only in Philadelphia, but all over the country as well. The study focused on Philadelphia's Seventh Ward (currently Center City Philadelphia) and the socioeconomic conditions of black churches, businesses and homes within the neighborhood. Using statistics Du Bois created from his survey data, Du Bois compared the occupation, income, education, family size, health, drug use, criminal activity, and suffrage of black and white residents living in the Seventh Ward and to Philadelphia's other wards. Du Bois used statistical evidence to highlight the socioeconomic inequalities the black community faced and make the black community's suffrage known to whites. In turn, he disproved stereotypes surrounding the black community which were cited as the sources of "The Negro Problem."

=== 1900 to 1950s ===
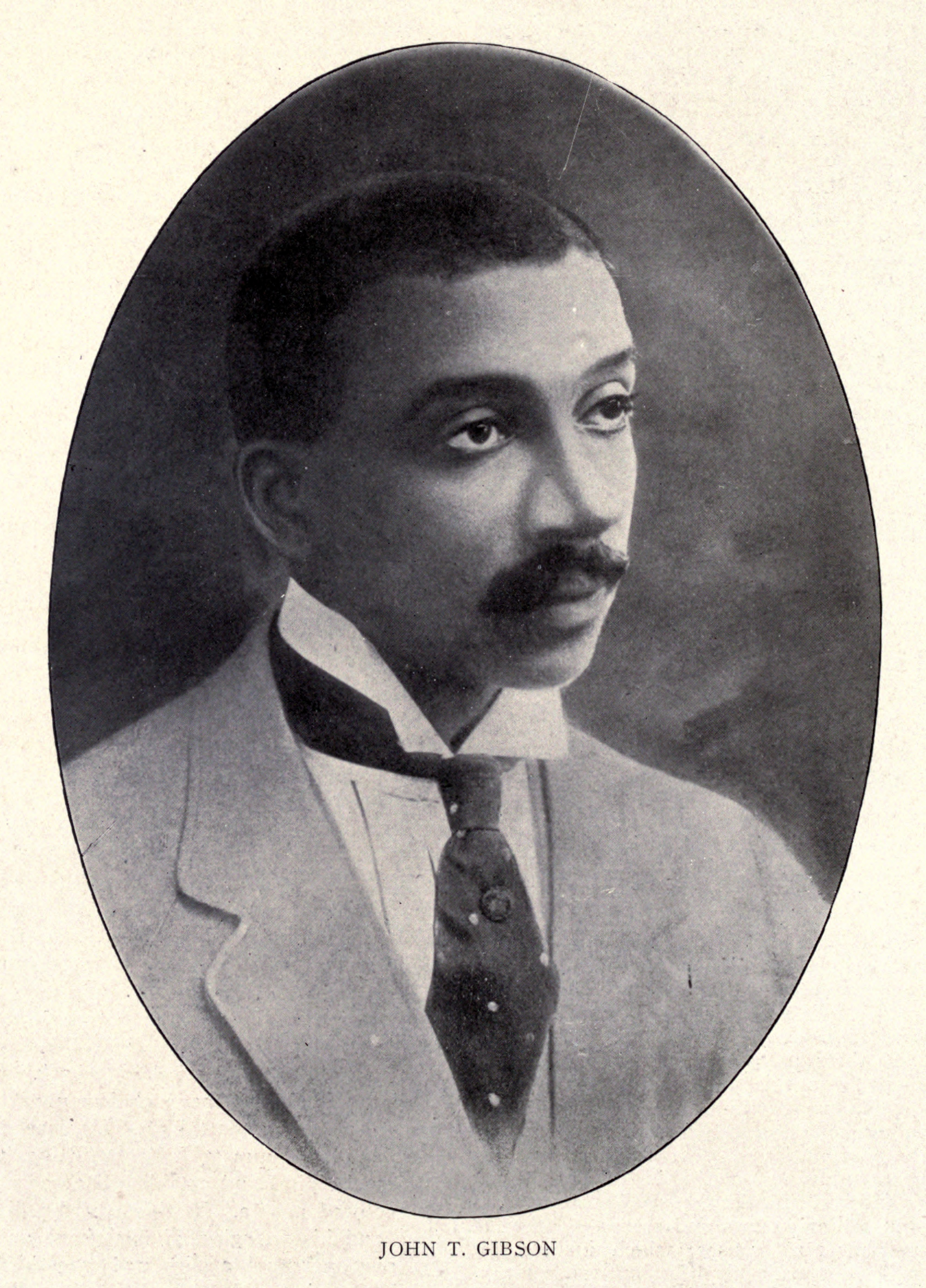
John T. Gibson owned the Standard Theatre in Philadelphia PA (1919)

World War I brought an influx of black migrants from the rural South, who moved to Philadelphia lured by wartime jobs there during the Great Migration. As a result, the black population of Philadelphia doubled again from 63,000 in 1900 to 134,000 in 1920.Most of the new residents came from rural backgrounds and were working poor.

Efforts to build new structures to house the workers were insufficient, so African Americans in search of housing moved into existing houses in white neighborhoods, where they encountered hostility and racism. In July 1918, after two black families on Pine Street were attacked by white neighbors who burned household furnishings, G. Grant Williams, editor of the Philadelphia Tribune, wrote of the "Pine Street war Zone": "We stand for peace," he said, and advised Black residents to "stand your ground like men," adding “You are not down in Dixie now and you need not fear the ragged rum crazed hellion crew... They may burn your property, but you burn their hides with any weapon that comes handy while they engage in this illegal pastime."

Three weeks later, racial violence erupted again which lasted for several days. During the riot, black homes were destroyed by white mobs, three people were killed, one man was nearly lynched, and a white police officer beat up a black man while he was in the hospital. As a result, African Americans in Philadelphia formed the Colored Protective Association, led by Reverend RR Wright Jr., to "have a permanent organization of protection" to fight discrimination in schools, housing, employment and elsewhere, and to investigate cases of police brutality and police collusion with the white rioters. Their efforts eventually led to the removal of the entire police force by the Director of Public Safety.

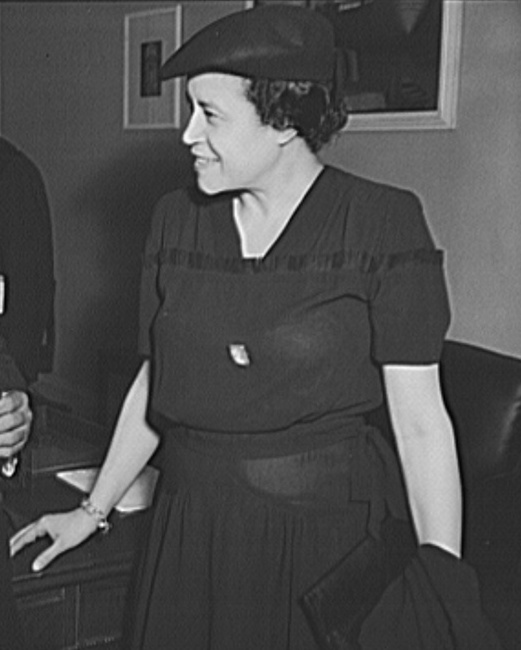
Crystal Bird Fauset, first Black female state legislator, elected 1938

In 1925, the artist and printmaker Dox Thrash moved to Philadelphia, where he would spend most of his career. Black Opals, an African American literary magazine associated with the Harlem Renaissance was published in Philadelphia between spring 1927 and July 1928,. Co-edited by Arthur Huff Fauset and Nellie Rathbone Bright, the magazine's contributors included Mae Virginia Cowdery, Jessie Redmon Fauset, Marita Bonner, and Gwendolyn B. Bennett. Allan Randall Freelon was the magazine's artistic director. Also in the 1920s, John T Gibson became the wealthiest Black entrepreneur in Philadelphia because of his ownership of the popular Standard and Dunbar theaters and his management of diverse musical and vaudeville acts.

The Great Depression hit Black Philadelphians hard. By 1933, 50% of all Black residents were unemployed. And yet by 1935, African Americans owned 9,855 homes and 787 stores; they were also working in more professional occupations, like physicians ( 200); clergymen ( 250); schoolteachers (553) and policemen ( 219). Their neighborhoods were also becoming more concentrated and more segregated from white neighborhoods.

In 1938, Crystal Bird Fauset became the first female African American elected as state legislator.

Though World War II brought wartime jobs to African Americans, they still faced substandard housing and were not allowed to work on Philadelphia public transit as motormen or conductors until the Federal Government stepped in to pressure the Philadelphia Transportation Company to open up these jobs to them in 1944. From August 1–6, white transit workers responded by staging a massive sickout strike. After pressure from the NAACP, the Federal Government sent in 5,000 troops to break the strike and keep public transportation running.

Philadelphia was a center for the mid twentieth century Golden Age of Gospel music, attracting performers like the nationally renowned male quartets the Dixie Hummingbirds and the Sensational Nightingales, as well as Marion Williams before she started her solo career.

=== 1950s to present ===
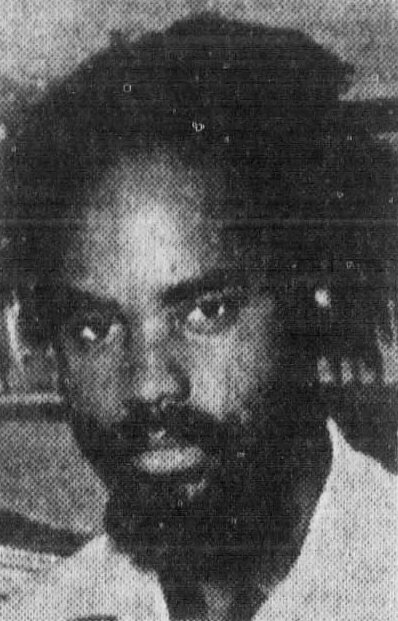
Mumia Abu-Jamal c. 1980

The fight against discrimination and segregation in education and employment continued through the 1950s and 60s, with legal battles and protests occurring throughout those years. Cecil B. Moore, president of the local NAACP, was a leading activist during that time, and Reverend Leon Sullivan was instrumental in building Black community and economic power. Marie Hicks successfully organized demonstrations and brought a lawsuit against Girard College to desegregate that institution. In 1964, a clash between police officers and residents sparked a three-day riot.

The 1960s saw a rise in the Black Power movement in Philadelphia. Freedom Library on Ridge Avenue in North Philadelphia, started in 1964 by John Churchville, was where Churchville and other activists gathered to form the Black Power Unity Movement in 1965. Another important center of Black Power was The Church of the Advocate in North Central Philadelphia, whose congregation had become increasingly African American. Father Paul Washington organized the first Black Power rally in 1966; soon there were rallies all over the city, and the third national conference in Philadelphia attracted 2,000 people. The newspaper Voice of Umuja came out of the conference.

Reggie Schell became the leader of the Philadelphia chapter of the Black Panther Party in 1969. Under his leadership, the party held rallies and created food distribution and education programs throughout the city. Black Power spilled onto college and high school campuses, where students demonstrated for more Black faculty and Black studies classes. In 1970, Philadelphia police raids of three offices of Black Power activists at gunpoint, in which they publicly strip searched activists, made international news for their brutality and united the Black community in outrage. Later that year, the Panther sponsored Revolutionary People's Constitutional Convention was held at Temple University and attracted 14,000 people.

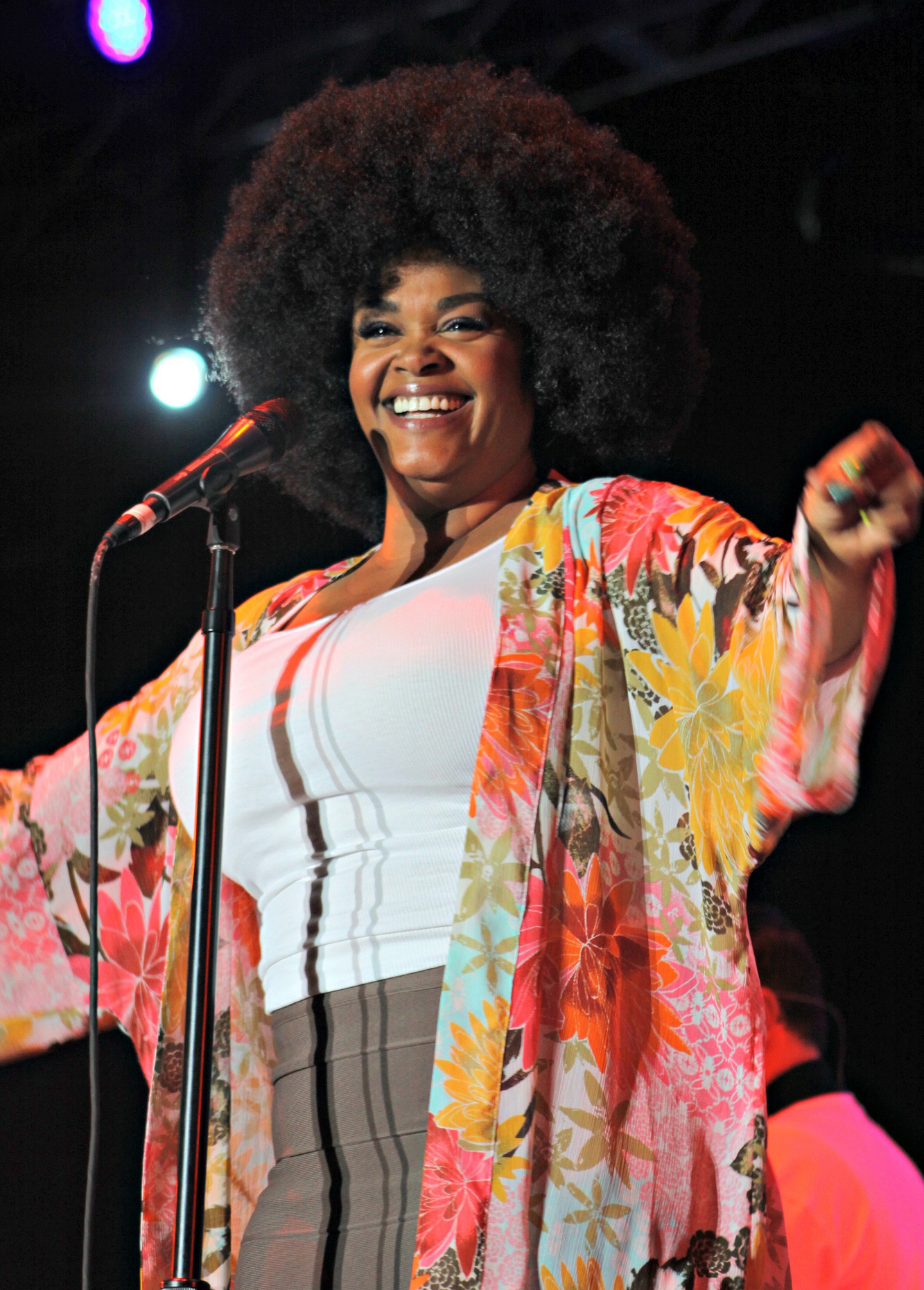
Philadelphia-born Jill Scott performs in 2012

Philadelphia soul was a genre of music that arose in the late 1960s and 1970s. Influenced by funk, it was characterized by lush instrumental arrangements with sweeping strings and piercing horns. Fred Wesley described it as "putting the bow tie on funk." It moved funk more towards the disco sound that would become popular in the late 1970s and influenced later Philadelphia-born music makers like singer Jill Scott.

Predominantly Black group MOVE was founded in 1972 by John Africa. The organization lived in a communal setting in West Philadelphia, following philosophies of anarcho-primitivism. In 1978, a standoff between MOVE and the Philadelphia police resulted in the death of one police officer and injuries to sixteen officers and firefighters. Nine members were convicted of killing the officer and received life sentences. In 1985, another conflict resulted in a police helicopter dropping a bomb onto the roof of the MOVE compound, a townhouse that was located at 6221 Osage Avenue. The ensuing fire killed six MOVE members and five of their children, and destroyed sixty-five houses in the neighborhood. The police bombing was strongly condemned. The MOVE survivors later filed a civil suit against the City of Philadelphia and the PPD and were awarded $1.5 million in a 1996 settlement. Other residents displaced by the destruction of the bombing filed a civil suit against the city and in 2005 were awarded $12.72 million in damages in a jury trial.

In 1982, Mumia Abu-Jamal, a Philadelphia activist and journalist, was convicted and sentenced to death for the 1981 murder in Philadelphia of police officer Daniel Faulkner. He became widely known while on death row for his writings and commentary on the U.S. criminal justice system. After numerous appeals, his death penalty sentence was overturned by a Federal court, with the prosecution agreeing in 2011 to a sentence of life imprisonment without parole.

Many Philadelphia activists of the mid to late 20th century went on to achieve political power. In 1975, Cecil B. Moore won a seat on the City Council. C. Delores Tucker (1927–2005) became the first black Pennsylvanian appointed to the office of the secretary of state. David P. Richardson (1948–1995) was elected to the Pennsylvania House of Representatives in 1972. In 1984, W. Wilson Goode (b. 1938) became Philadelphia's first Black mayor. Goode's administration was followed by Black mayors John Street (b. 1943) and Michael Nutter (b. 1957).

Many Black Philadelphia natives have moved to the suburbs or to Southern cities such as Atlanta, Dallas, Houston, Birmingham, Memphis, San Antonio and Jackson.

Despite the persistence of problems like unemployment and high public school dropout rates, the Black community in Philadelphia in the early 21st century continued to attract new residents and contribute its talents and energy to the city. In 2010, its total population stood at 657,343 people or 43.4 percent of Philadelphia's entire population.

== Institutions ==
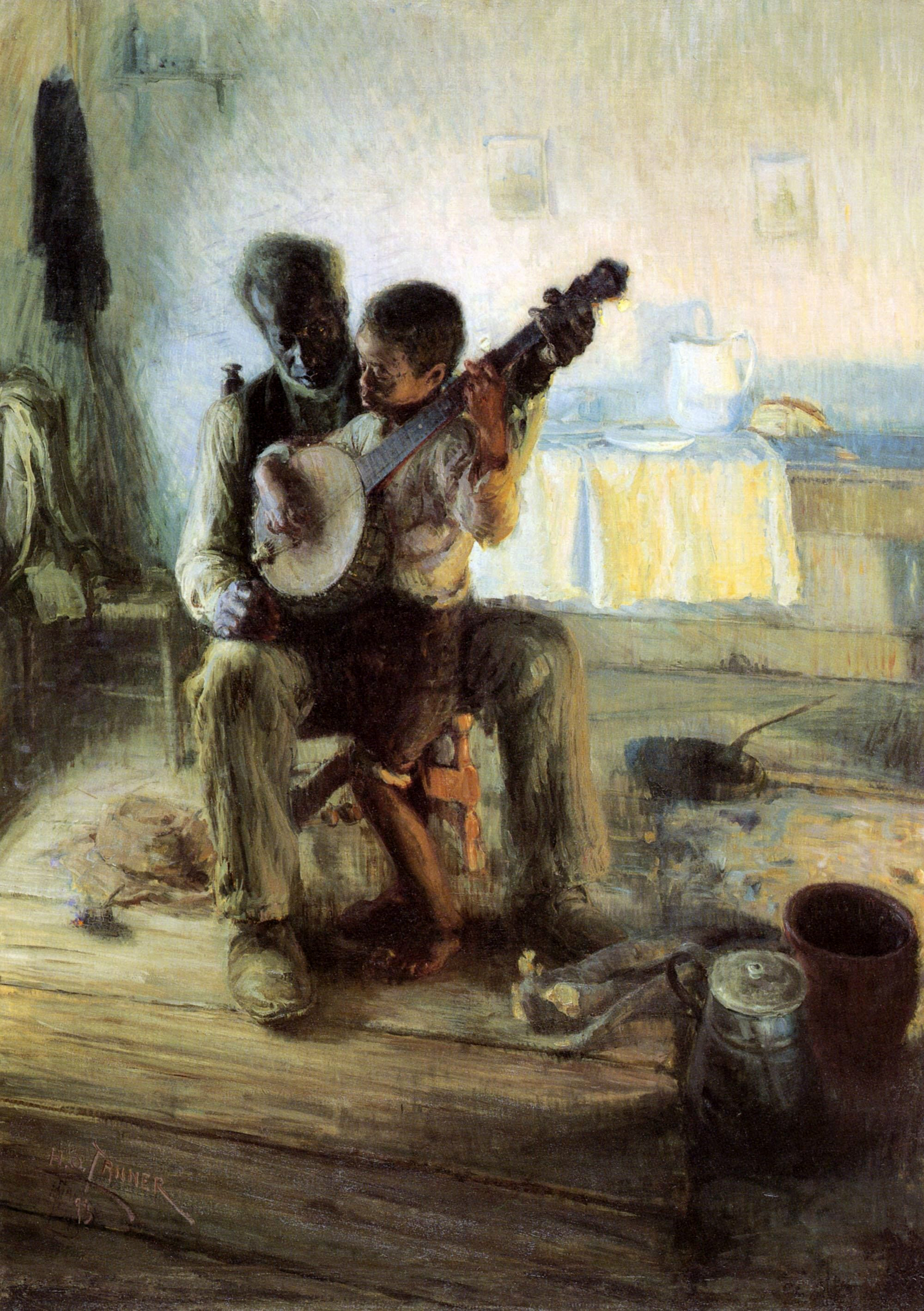
Henry Ossawa Tanner painted his most famous work, The Banjo Lesson, in 1893 in Philadelphia

The African American Museum in Philadelphia is located in Center City.

The Aces Museum honors WWII veterans and their families.

The Colored Girls Museum, founded by Vashti DuBois, is dedicated to the history of Black women and girls.

The National Marian Anderson Museum celebrates the life of the notable opera singer Marian Anderson.

The Paul Robeson House hosts tours of Robeson's former residence.

== Geography ==
=== 20th century ===
Circa 1961 Society Hill was a majority black and low income neighborhood, but by 1976 it became gentrified and mostly white with the remaining black population residing in about three or four high-rise apartment buildings with high rents. Black Enterprise wrote that a possible reason why wealthier blacks opted not to move to Society Hill was "Unpleasant memories of the old neighborhood". By then many blacks were moving to Wynnefield, with many originating from Cobbs Creek and Overbrook; the new residents of Wynnefield had recently become middle class. Also Circa 1976 many African-Americans resided in Powelton Village. The majority originated from other states and held professional positions, including artists, graduate students, musicians, teachers, and writers.

=== 21st century ===
From 1990 to 2010, black residents moved in significant numbers away from the core areas of North and West Philadelphia to Southwest Philadelphia, Overbrook, the Lower Northeast, and elsewhere. The number of Black residents in zip code 19120—which includes the neighborhoods of Olney and Feltonville and abuts Montgomery County -rose from 9,786 in 1990 to 33,209 in 2010, an increase of 239 percent.

== Religion ==
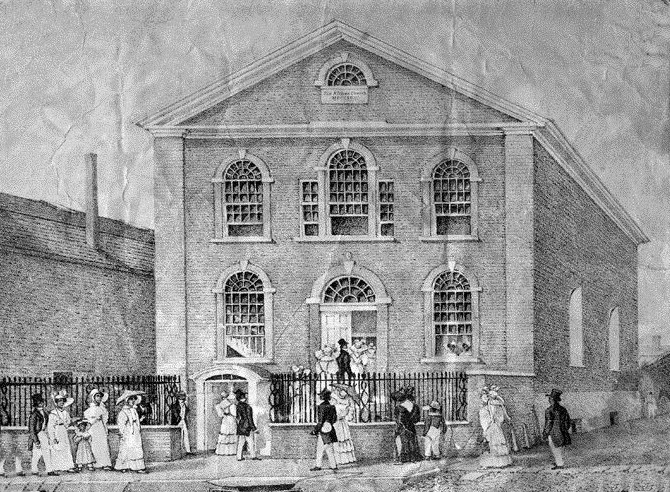
An 1829 image of the African Episcopal Church of St. Thomas

The African Episcopal Church of St. Thomas, established in 1792, was the first house of worship created by and for black people in the United States. While the St. George's United Methodist Church had initially allowed Black worshipers in the main area, its Black worshipers left after the church moved them to the gallery area by 1787.

== Education ==
The first school for black males was established by the Pennsylvania Abolition Society in 1794. In 1813, the Society constructed the school building Clarkson Hall on Cherry Street, and in 1854, created Lombard Street Infant School as an aid to working parents.

In 1976, 66% of all students of the School District of Philadelphia were black; this number was proportionally high since whites of all economic backgrounds had a tendency to use private schools. Wealthier blacks chose not to use private schools because their neighborhoods were assigned to higher-quality public schools.

== Crime ==
Black people in Philadelphia are more likely to be charged with felonies than non-blacks. The homicide victim rate for black people in Philadelphia is also higher.

== Notable residents ==
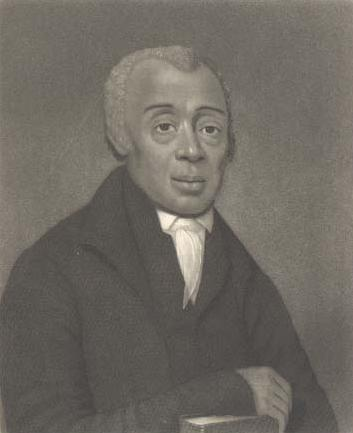
Richard Allen (1760–1831), a Methodist bishop and founder of the African Methodist Episcopal Church

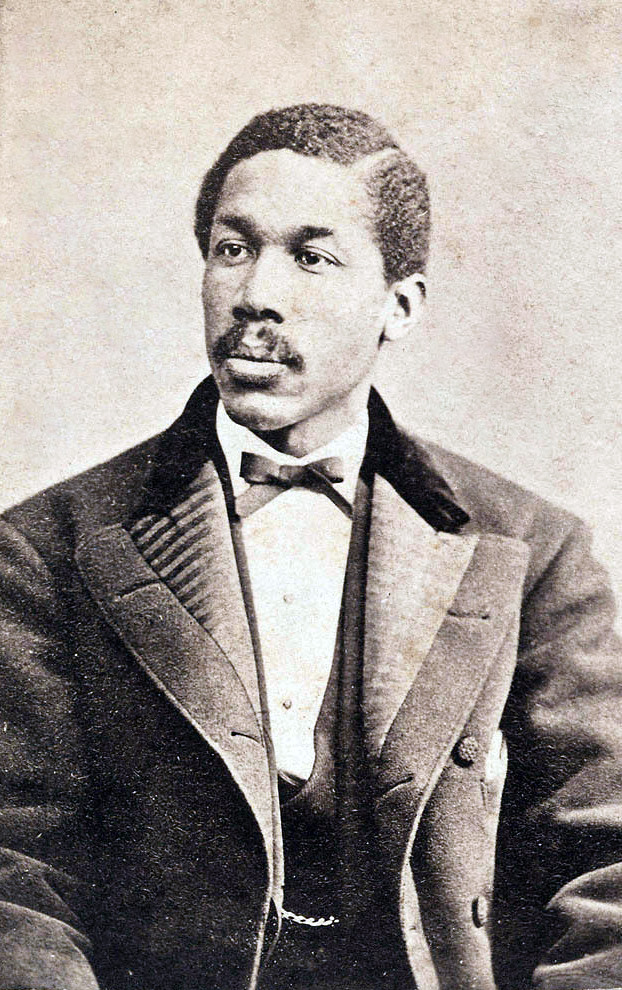
Octavius Catto, voting rights activist, was killed while trying to cast his ballot

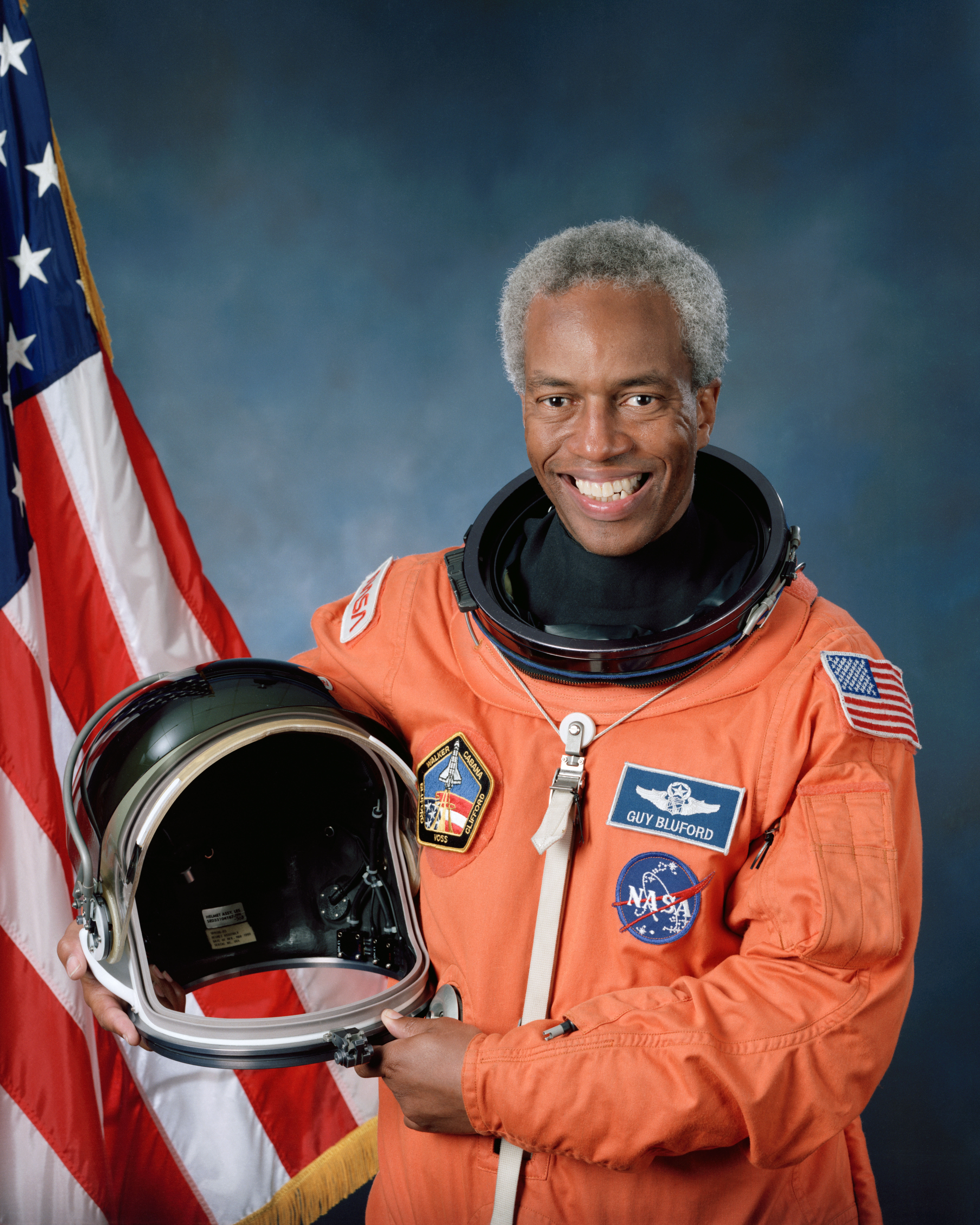
Astronaut Guion Bluford, born and raised in Philadelphia

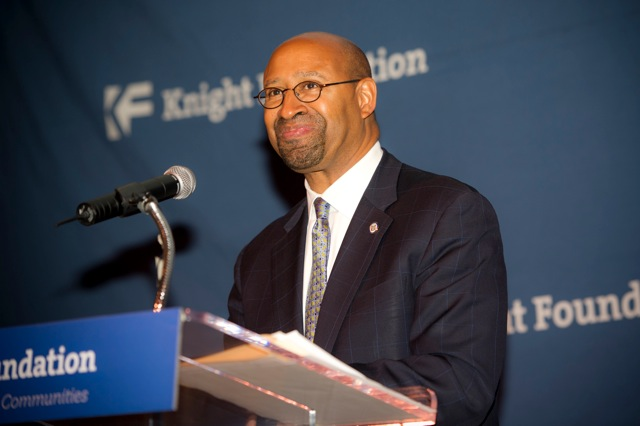
Philadelphia Mayor Michael A. Nutter

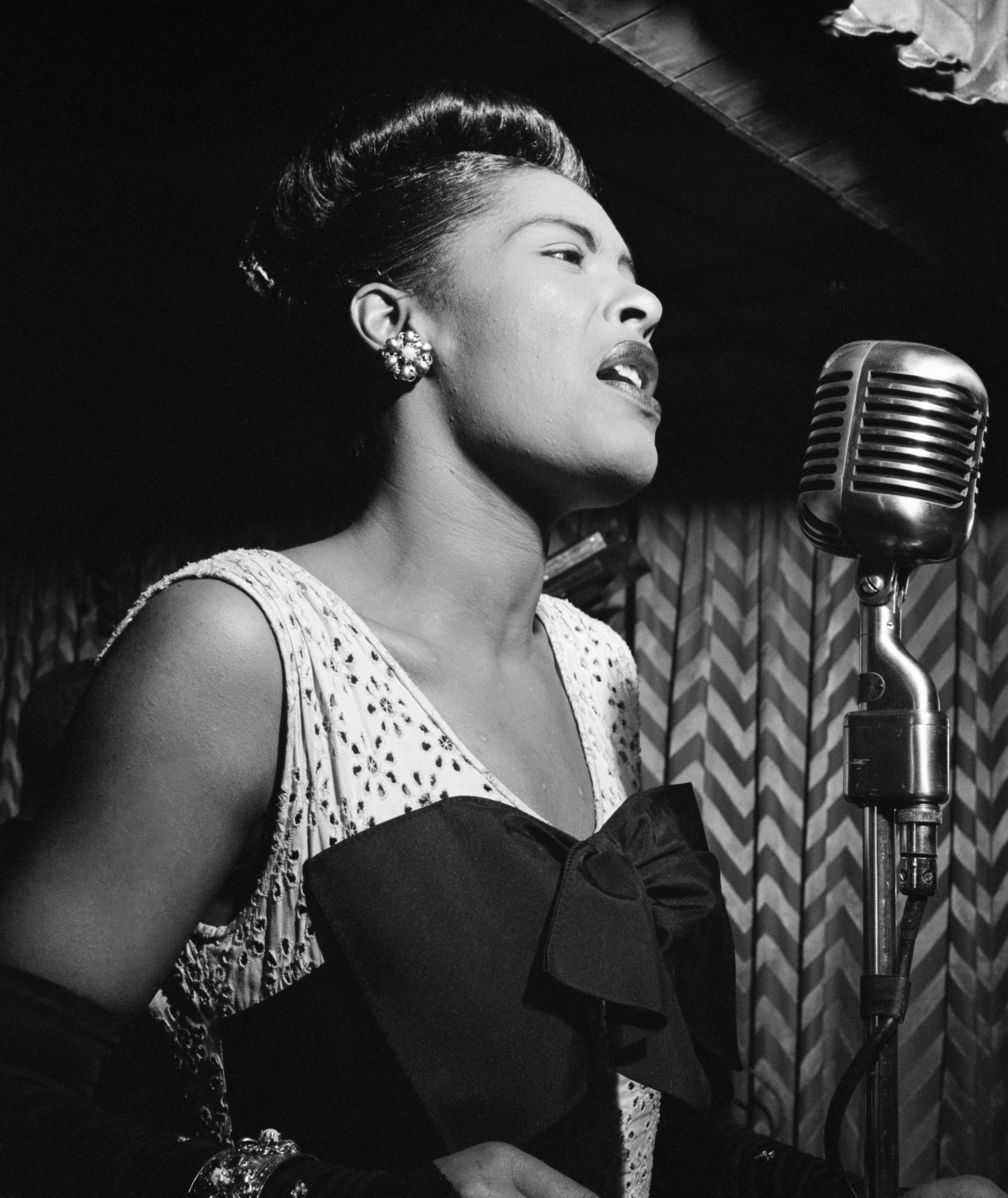
Billie Holiday spent her childhood in Philadelphia

=== 18th–19th centuries ===
- Richard Allen, religious leader, author, journalist
- Sarah Allen, abolitionist, underground railroad conductor, missionary
- Cyrus Bustill, 18th century entrepreneur, abolitionist and community leader
- Jabez Pitt Campbell, abolitionist, and the 8th Bishop of the Methodist Episcopal Church
- Amy Matilda Cassey, activist, and abolitionist
- Joseph Cassey, businessman, abolitionist, and activist
- Octavius Catto, educator and Civil Rights activist
- Rebecca Cole, doctor and social reformer
- Rebecca Cox Jackson, founder of a Shaker community in Philadelphia
- Nathaniel W. Depee, activist, and abolitionist
- Frederick Douglass, social reformer, writer, and abolitionist
- Charlotte Vandine Forten, abolitionist
- James Forten, early 19th century businessman and abolitionist
- Margaretta Forten, suffragist and abolitionist
- Grace Douglass, abolitionist
- Sarah Mapps Douglass, 19th century educator
- Richard Theodore Greener, professor, lawyer, scholar
- Charlotte Forten Grimké, 19th century civil rights activist, woman's rights activist
- Frances Ellen Watkins Harper, abolitionist, suffragette, poet, author
- Jarena Lee, preacher
- Absalom Jones, minister, abolitionist, and founder of Free African Society
- John McKee, philanthropist, property owner
- Zedekiah Johnson Purnell, activist, and businessman
- Harriet Forten Purvis, abolitionist
- Robert Purvis, abolitionist, lived most of his life in Philadelphia
- Sarah Louisa Forten Purvis, abolitionist, suffragist
- William B. Purvis, inventor and businessman
- Stephen Smith, businessman, philanthropist, preacher, real estate developer, and abolitionist
- William Whipper, businessman and abolitionist
- Peter Williams Jr., pastor and abolitionist

=== 20th–21st centuries ===
- Julian Abele, architect
- Meta Vaux Warrick Fuller, artist
- Henry Ossawa Tanner, painter
- Bessie Smith, blues singer and actress
- Alain LeRoy Locke, Harlem Renaissance philosopher, journalist, author, scholar
- Raymond Pace Alexander, Lawyer and civil rights activist
- Rex Stewart, cornetist/trumpeter, journalist, disk jockey, publisher
- Billie Holiday, singer
- Ethel Waters, Singer, comedienne and actress
- Marian Anderson, contralto opera singer
- Crystal Bird Fausett, first African-American female state legislator (elected 1938)
- Kobe Bryant, basketball player
- Michael Nutter, Mayor of Philadelphia
- John F. Street, Mayor of Philadelphia
- Luckey Roberts, pianist and composer
- Teddy Pendergrass, Singer, songwriter and drummer
- Ed Bradley, News correspondent
- Wilt Chamberlain, basketball player
- Will Smith, rapper, actor
- Guion S. Bluford, astronaut, scientist, pilot
- Kevin Hart, actor, comedian
- Patti LaBelle, singer, actor
- Judith Jamison, ballet dancer, choreographer
- Jill Scott, singer
- Sherman Hemsley, actor
- Solomon Burke, singer
- W. Wilson Goode, Mayor of Philadelphia
- Mumia Abu-Jamal (born Wesley Cook)
- Bill Cosby, Comedian and actor
- Raymond Pace Alexander, lawyer, judge and politician
- Lil Uzi Vert, rapper
- Eve, rapper, singer, actress, and television presenter
- Meek Mill, rapper
- Beanie Sigel, rapper
- Erykah Badu, singer-songwriter
- Questlove, musician
- Jazmine Sullivan, singer
- Freeway, rapper
- Grover Washington, Jr., Saxophonist, Musician, Writer, Producer, Arranger, Educator

== See also ==
- Arch Street Friends Meeting House
- Vigilant Association of Philadelphia
- Demographics of Philadelphia
- Puerto Ricans in Philadelphia
- History of the Jews in Philadelphia
- History of Irish Americans in Philadelphia
- History of Italian Americans in Philadelphia
- African Americans in New York City
- African Americans in New Jersey
- History of Pennsylvania
- History of Philadelphia
