= Art Baker (actor) =

American actor (1898–1966)

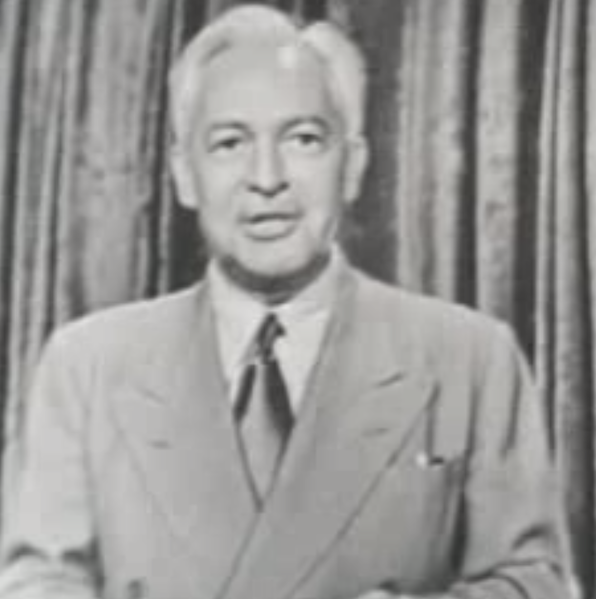
- Baker in You Asked for It (1951)
- Born: Arthur Shank; January 7, 1898; New York City, U.S.
- Died: August 26, 1966 (aged 68); Los Angeles, California, U.S.
- Resting place: Forest Lawn Memorial Park, Glendale, California
- Occupation: Actor
- Years active: 1928–1966
- Spouses: Marian Hill (m. 1920; div. 19??); Maida Sarah Waters (m. 1930; div. 1945); Alice Weaver (m. 1948; div. 1956); Gerri Larsen (m. 1957)
- Children: 5

Art Baker (born Arthur Appleton Shank; January 7, 1898 – August 26, 1966) was an American film, television and radio actor.

== Early years ==
Baker was born January 7, 1898, in New York City. He initially planned to be a singer, and during World War I he was a song leader while serving in the United States Army. During his time in the Army, his hair turned prematurely white and would later serve as his trademark look. His post-war occupations included touring with traveling evangelist Aimee Semple McPherson, founder of the Foursquare Church, and operating an appliance store in Glendale, California.

== Radio ==
Baker's radio career began as an announcer on Los Angeles radio station KFSG. He later worked at Forest Lawn Memorial Park as a tour guide. Baker was chosen to be the narrator of the radio program Tapestries of Life. The show aired on Los Angeles radio station KFI and became syndicated nationally. Tapestries of Life aired for two decades. Baker went on to work on as many as 22 shows per week.

In 1936 General Mills cast Baker as Captain Bob Baker the Bisquick Maker to host the CBS show, Hollywood in Person, a first of its kind tabloid program in which a "studio on wheels" mobile production trailer would arrive at set locations to conduct candid interviews with celebrities about their gossip and rumors. The show was co-hosted by Louise Roberts (Lois Collier) and ran for two years.

On September 8, 1938, Baker created Art Baker's Notebook on radio station KFI, which lasted for two decades. The program was syndicated in more than 50 markets via electrical transcription, and aired uninterrupted for more than 2,000 episodes. An innovative and widely successful publicity stunt was performed in 1947 on Art Baker's Notebook, when Baker interviewed Jimmy Stewart about his upcoming film It's a Wonderful Life. Baker offered listeners a free transcript of the show and photo of him with Jimmy Stewart. The show received nearly 50,000 letters in the first week.

From 1939 to 1941 Baker worked on The Hedda Hopper Show sponsored by Sunkist.

In 1941 Baker became the announcer for Bob Hope's The Pepsodent Show.

People Are Funny debuted on NBC on April 10, 1942, with Baker as host. The program's stunts and audience participation were calculated to reveal the humorous side of human nature. People Are Funny was the first game show to air repeats. Art Linkletter replaced Baker in 1943.

Also in 1943, Baker hosted CBS's Meet Joe Public, during which studio audience members expressed views on current events.

In the mid 1940s, Baker served as the announcer for A Date with Judy.

In the 1930s and 1940s Baker's voice could be heard in all major markets in the United States, and he was a part of as many as 22 aired shows, commercials, or productions a week.

In 1956, Time magazine featured an article on Baker titled "Radio: The Voice from Forest Lawn".

== Film ==
Baker appeared in more than 40 films. His tall, slim frame, snow white hair, smooth slightly nasal voice and genial nature made him a natural choice to play business executives, doctors, and senators in film.

In 1939 Baker narrated an historical documentary on the City of Glendale, California, called Glendale on Parade, which became the only documentary of its kind for the city and featured many historical landmarks and achievements in Glendale history. It also served as a time capsule capturing the everyday life of an emerging city in the 1930s.

In 1943, Baker narrated the Academy Award nominated, Walt Disney produced, propaganda documentary Victory Through Air Power. This film was created to catch the attention of government officials and to build public morale among the U.S. and Allied powers. The film played a significant role for the Disney studio because it was the beginning of the company's entry into educational films in which its cartoon characters were used as marketing tools.

In 1945 Baker was cast as Detective Lt. Cooley in Alfred Hitchcock's critically acclaimed and Oscar-nominated film Spellbound, starring Gregory Peck and Ingrid Bergman.

In 1947 Baker worked with Loretta Young in The Farmer's Daughter. Young won the Oscar for Best Actress for her role as Katrin Holstrom.

In 1949 Baker had title card credit in Cover Up starring William Bendix, Dennis O'Keefe, and Barbara Britton.

== Television ==
Baker hosted many television shows in his career but is best known for his work on a series he created in 1950 titled You Asked for It (for which he became affectionately dubbed, the "genie with the light, white hair"). The show debuted under the title of The Art Baker Show and aired on the DuMont Television Network. The style was a write-in format that allowed viewers to make requests as to what they would like to see. The show traveled the world fulfilling requests of its viewers. In 1951 the show's name was changed to You Asked for It, and it was moved to ABC. It aired until 1959 and became the longest-running show of its kind and established the format for future travel/variety shows. The show would become one of Baker's greatest achievements and solidified his place in television history. During the last 20 months of the show, Baker was replaced by Jack Smith.

Another Baker TV program, End of the Rainbow, debuted January 11, 1958. The program helped unsuspecting people "who are in need of a push to make a success of their dreams, such as a chance to regain a sound footing in business". The show was co-hosted by Bob Barker.

== Hollywood Walk of Fame ==
Baker has a star on the Hollywood Walk of Fame for his work in radio and TV. The star, at 6509 Hollywood Boulevard, was dedicated on February 8, 1960.

== Personal life ==
In 1920 Baker married Marian Hill and had four children: Virginia, who died of tuberculosis, Arthur (Bart), Robert, and Dorothy. Baker and his wife divorced in the late 1920s.

In 1930 Arthur married Maida Sarah Waters (Aimee Semple McPherson's secretary). They had one child, Diane, who attended Hoover High School in Glendale, California. They divorced in 1945.

Baker married Broadway actress Alice Weaver in 1948, and they divorced in 1956.

On August 11, 1957, Baker married his fourth wife, magician Gerri Larsen, in London. Their marriage was featured on the cover of Genii magazine. Gerri Larsen's sons, Milt and Bill were the founders of the Magic Castle in Hollywood in 1963. Baker became the host of It's Magic a stage show credited with rejuvenating interest in magic in America.

Baker was a Rotarian and was the song leader for the 1938 Rotary International Annual Convention in San Francisco.

Art Baker lived in Glendale, California, for most of his career and would later move to Palm Springs, California.

== Death ==
Baker died of a heart attack at a bank in Los Angeles August 26, 1966.

Baker is interred in the Great Mausoleum at Forest Lawn Glendale, in the same hall where he began his career.

== Partial filmography ==
- Artists and Models (1937) as 2nd Announcer (uncredited)
- Partners in Crime (1937) as Radio Announcer (uncredited)
- Stand-In (1937) as Director of Photography (uncredited)
- Torchy Blane in Panama (1938) as Assistant Bank Manager (uncredited)
- Prairie Moon (1938) as Judge Arthur Dean (uncredited)
- Trade Winds (1938) as Police Announcer (voice, uncredited)
- Slightly Honorable (1939) as Radio Announcer
- South of the Border with Disney (1942) as the narrator
- The North Star (1943) as Radio Voice (voice, uncredited)
- Once Upon a Time (1944) as Gabriel Heatter (uncredited)
- The Amazon Awakens (1944) as the narrator
- Tuberculosis (1945) as the narrator
- Cleanliness Brings Health (1945) as the narrator
- Hookworm (1945) as the narrator
- Spellbound (1945) as Det. Lt. Cooley
- Environmental Sanitation (1946) as the narrator
- Planning for Good Eating (1946) as the narrator
- Abie's Irish Rose (1946) as Rabbi Jacob Samuels
- The Beginning or the End (1947) as President Truman
- The Farmer's Daughter (1947) as Anders J. Finley
- Dark Delusion (1947) as Dr. Sanford Burson
- Daisy Kenyon (1947) as Lucille's Attorney
- State of the Union (1948) as Leith, Radio Announcer
- Homecoming (1948) as Williams, Reporter on Transport Ship (uncredited)
- Silver River (1948) as Major Wilson (uncredited)
- The Walls of Jericho (1948) as Peddigrew
- A Southern Yankee (1948) as Col. Clifford M. Baker
- Walk a Crooked Mile (1948) as Dr. Frederick Townsend
- The Decision of Christopher Blake (1948) as Mr. Kurlick
- Cover Up (1949) as Stu Weatherby
- Impact (1949) as Eldredge, Defense Attorney
- Take One False Step (1949) as Henry Pritchard
- Night Unto Night (1949) as Dr. Poole
- Massacre River (1949) as Col. James Reid
- Any Number Can Play (1949) as Mr. Reardon
- Task Force (1949) as Sen. Vincent
- Easy Living (1949) as Howard Vollmer
- The Underworld Story (1950) as Lt. Tilton
- Hot Rod (1950) as Judge Langham
- The Du Pont Story (1950) as Chemical Director
- Belle Le Grand (1951) as Defense Attorney (uncredited)
- Cause for Alarm! (1951) as Superintendent
- Only the Valiant (1951) as Capt. Jennings
- Here Comes the Groom (1951) as Radio Announcer
- Living It Up (1954) as Radio Announcer (uncredited)
- Artists and Models (1955) as TV Commentator (uncredited)
- Twelve Hours to Kill (1960) as Police Captain Johns
- Swingin' Along (1961) as Television Announcer
- Voyage to the Bottom of the Sea (1961) as UN Commentator (uncredited)
- Young Dillinger (1965) as Warden
- The Wild Angels (1966) as Thomas, Mortician (final film role)
