= Lillian Yarbo =

American actress, dancer and singer (1905–1996)

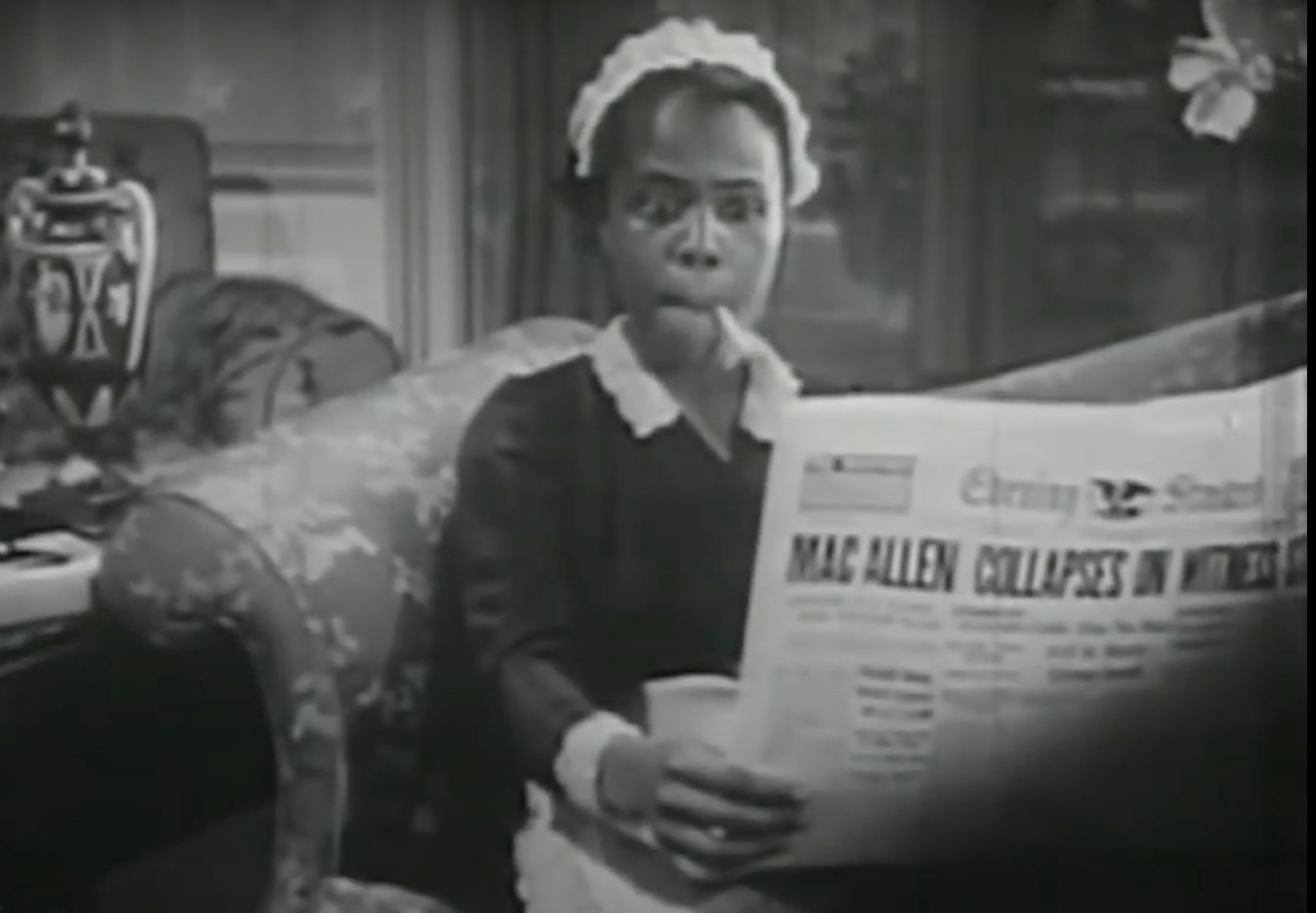
- Yarbo in Wives Under Suspicion (1938)
- Born: Lillian Yarbough; March 17, 1905; Washington, DC, United States
- Died: June 12, 1996 (aged 91); Seattle, Washington, U.S.
- Other names: Credited prior to October 8, 1928, as Billie Yarbough and from then until her 1936 screen debut Billie Yarbo
- Occupations: Actress, singer, dancer
- Years active: 1927–1949

Lillian "Billie" Yarbo (born Lillian Yarbough; March 17, 1905 – June 12, 1996) was an American stage and screen actress, dancer, and singer.

== Early life ==
Born Lillian Yarbough in Washington, DC, she made her way to New York, as did both her mother and at least one sister. When they travelled and whether they did so together is unclear. (Note: There is a "Yarbough, George; fireman," listed in the District of Columbia Directories for 1904 through 1906. Moreover, given Yarbo's seemingly genuine aversion to publicity (thus the very real possibility that even "Yarbough" itself might be her ever so slight variation on the actual birth name), the presence of "Yarebough, Lillian D." in the 1905 directory cannot be discounted.)

== Career ==
=== Stage ===
By her early 20s, Yarbo, credited prior to October 1928 as Yarbough, was a rising star both in Harlem night spots and on the Broadway stage. Writing in The New Yorker, reviewing the Miller and Lyles musical, Keep Shufflin', a young Charles Brackett alerted readers: "There is a Miss Billie Yarbough, who must have been designed by Covarrubias and must be seen." With a style sometimes likened to that of her contemporary, Josephine Baker, Yarbo was embraced by audiences and critics alike, beginning in the late 1920s and continuing until her 1936 screen debut. As for her vocal stylings, just a few, fleeting, onscreen remnants exist. For example, she sings a few bars of "Swing Low, Sweet Chariot" in the film version of A Date with Judy. (See also relevant excerpt from The Family Next Door in External links). That said, Yarbo clearly did not lack for confidence, having once told trumpeter Buck Clayton, "To hell with Billie Holiday! Come down and listen to me, the real Billie."

=== Screen ===
Yarbo appeared in at least two films in 1936 and 1937 before her first onscreen credit in the following year in the Warren William vehicle, Wives Under Suspicion. Whilst that film was received somewhat indifferently by critics, reviews noted her performance as particularly praiseworthy. For that and her equally acclaimed performance in Frank Capra's successful adaptation of Kaufman and Hart's You Can't Take It With You (which, by virtue of the film's panoramic, full-cast billboard, also inspired a new nickname), Yarbo was judged 1938's best Negro comedic actress by Pittsburgh Courier film critic Earl J. Morris. In 1939, she was awarded that same distinction by the short-lived Sepia Theatrical Writers Guild. Indeed, even prior to 1938, the then-as-yet thoroughly anonymous Yarbo—as Claire Trevor's maid in Alfred Werker's much-rewritten Big Town Girl—caught the eye of one reviewer who noted that "a Negro lassie—inexcusably omitted from the cast list—renders yeoman service and considerable comedy as the countess' maid".

Awards and favorable notices notwithstanding, and despite director King Vidor's personal support for her as early as 1937 (following Yarbo's sophomore screen turn, appearing uncredited with Barbara Stanwyck in Vidor's Stella Dallas), she continued to be routinely cast in bit parts, primarily as a maid, cook or otherwise low-skilled worker, often uncredited, appearing in at least 50 films between 1936 and 1949.

In the fall of 1943, amid an already setback-laden half-decade, a potentially career-altering opportunity—being cast in a straight dramatic role opposite Canada Lee in a screen adaptation of Richard Wright's Native Son—failed to materialize when Orson Welles, who had directed Lee in the original Broadway production, proved unavailable. Adding injury to insult, just weeks later, a near-fatal car crash put Yarbo out of commission for the first half of 1944. She appeared in just one film that year, and over the next five averaged exactly two films a year, uncredited in all but one, ending her screen career much as it had begun.

=== Later years ===
On November 13, 1948, roughly four months after finishing work on her final film and roughly 13 years after her last stage performance, Yarbo returned to live performance. Perhaps inspired by having made, roughly two months prior, "one of her rare visits to a night spot," Yarbo, backed by Andy Kirk and His Clouds of Joy, performed at a benefit event staged at Club Congo (formerly Club Alabam) by the Alpha Phi Alpha House Campaign Committee to help fund "much-needed housing and scholarship for 'forgotten' students".

On May 19, 1949, The California Eagle's Gertrude Gipson reported that "C. P. Johnson on along with a six-piece combo, and Billy Yarbo, who has returned to dancing, will open at the Fairbanks in Alaska around the first". If this planned performance took place, it is Yarbo's last documented public performance.

About the same time Yarbo received some very nice notices for her last credited screen performance portraying "a giggling, singing, four-times-married little maid" in Warner Bros.' long-shelved Night Unto Night (1949), one more instance of Yarbo being one of the few reasons to watch—precisely as had been the case in her first credited role—in an otherwise "sleep-induc[ing]" picture: "Other characters include one who talks like someone out of a bad play, a couple of doctors, the heroine's sexy sister, and, fortunately, Lillian Yarbo as Josephine, the maid of all work, who provides the only bright spot in the generally murky atmosphere."

== Personal life ==
In 2006, NYU Professor of Media Studies Cathrine Kellison, speaking on the DVD commentary track of You Can't Take It With You (1938), briefly addressed Yarbo's known history: "Now Lillian Yarbo, here... she's... it's troubling how little information there is about her as a person. She was in probably 40, 50 films. Many of them, her name was not listed; she was uncredited." Kellison, who would die in 2009 with online newspaper archives still slim, did not live long enough to learn of Yarbo's illustrious pre-Hollywood heyday.

Yet taking into account the full scope of her career, it is curious that the close press coverage of Yarbo halted in the fall of 1949. After over two decades, it could be surmised that this was requested by Yarbo herself. One reason why she might have desired less attention appeared in a 1928 interview which, despite its condescending tone, portrays Yarbo as someone who did not aspire to fame and who—somewhat akin to her celebrated not-quite-namesake—genuinely valued her privacy. (Note: Tone notwithstanding, the Daily Eagle portrait is lent credence by the person Yarbo cites to exemplify fame's dire consequences: her fellow Washingtonian and possible role model, the then-recently deceased Florence Mills, whose tragic, premature death had been the subject of nationwide headlines roughly four months prior to Yarbo earning her first glowing Broadway reviews.)

Having finally secured that privacy, and adroitly handled her finances, Yarbo appears to have spent the remainder of her life in relative comfort in Seattle, Washington, where she died on June 12, 1996.

== Stage work ==
Partial listing of stage work (as Billie Yarbo, except where otherwise noted):

Opening date	Closing date	Title	Role	Theatre	Notes
Jun 27, 1927	Jul 13, 1927	Bottomland	Chorus (as Billie Yarbough)	Princess Theatre	
Feb 27, 1928	May 26, 1928	Keep Shufflin'	Yarbo (as Billie Yarbough)	Daly's 63rd Street Theatre	Eye-catching caricatures by Al Hirschfeld, and by Vyvyan Donner in The New York Times, plus brief but enthusiastic mentions in The New Yorker, Variety.
Jul 09, 1928	Jul 15, 1928	Follies of Paris	N/A	Lafayette Theatre	
Oct 08, 1928	Dec 15, 1928	Just a Minute	Mandy	Ambassador Theatre	
Mar 10, 1930	Mar 16, 1930	Fast Life	N/A	The Alhambra	
May 26, 1930	N/A	Happy Feet	N/A	The Alhambra	
Oct 22, 1930	Dec 13, 1930	Blackbirds of 1930	Performer, "(That) Lindy Hop" (as Billy Yarbo)	Royale Theatre	
Mar 16, 1931	Apr 05, 1931	Dave Peyton and His Regal Theatre Orchestra	N/A	Gibson Theatre, Philadelphia	Local coverage featured one of the very few pre-Hollywood photos of Yarbo, published in The Philadelphia Tribune (see first entry in Further reading).
Sep 15, 1932	Jan 25, 1933	Flying Colors	Performer, "Louisiana Hayride"; Performer, "Butlers"	Imperial Theatre	
Oct 07, 1933; Oct 21, 1933	Oct 13, 1933; Oct 27, 1933	Jimmy Lunceford and his Band	N/A	Lincoln Theatre, Philadelphia	
May 10, 1936	May 23, 1936	Harlem on Parade	N/A	Follies Theatre, Los Angeles	

== Filmography ==
- Rainbow on the River (1936) as Seline (uncredited)
- Stella Dallas (1937) as Gladys (uncredited)
- Big Town Girl (1937) as Scarlett (uncredited)
- Wives Under Suspicion (1938) as Creola
- Penrod's Double Trouble (1938) as Mrs. Washington (uncredited)
- You Can't Take It With You (1938) as Rheba
- Up the River (1938) as Black Prisoner (uncredited)
- There's That Woman Again (1938) as Ladies Room Attendant (uncredited)
- Kentucky (1938) as Magnolia (uncredited)
- Persons in Hiding (1939) as Beauty Parlor Maid
- Cafe Society (1939) as Mattie Harriett (uncredited)
- Society Lawyer (1939) as Sadie, Judy's Maid (uncredited)
- The Story of Vernon and Irene Castle (1939) as Mary, Claire's Maid (uncredited)
- The Family Next Door (1939) as Blossom
- Boy Friend (1939) as Delphinie (uncredited)
- The Jones Family in Hollywood (1939) as Maid (uncredited)
- The Gracie Allen Murder Case (1939) as Maid (uncredited)
- Way Down South (1939) as Janie
- Destry Rides Again (1939) as Clara
- Honeymoon Deferred (1940) as Janet's Maid (uncredited)
- Lillian Russell (1940) as Maid (uncredited)
- Lucky Cisco Kid (1940) as Queenie (uncredited)
- They Drive By Night (1940) as Chloe (uncredited)
- The Return of Frank James (1940) as Eleanor's Maid (uncredited)
- Sandy Gets Her Man (1940) as Hattie, the Maid (uncredited)
- Meet the Missus (1940) as Maid (uncredited)
- Buy Me That Town (1941) as Nancy
- International Lady (1941) as Prissy (uncredited)
- Henry Aldrich for President (1941) as Lucinda
- Moon Over Her Shoulder (1941) as Juline, the Maid (uncredited)
- Wild Bill Hickok Rides (1942) as Daisy, Belle's Maid
- The Great Man's Lady (1942) as Mandy
- Footlight Serenade (1942) as Estelle's Maid (uncredited)
- Between Us Girls (1942) as Phoebe, the Maid
- Presenting Lily Mars (1942) as Rosa, Isobel's Maid (uncredited)
- Redhead from Manhattan (1943) as Polly (uncredited)
- Swing Shift Maisie (1943) as Myrtlee
- Whistling in Brooklyn (1943) as Maid (uncredited)
- Music for Millions (1944) as Jessie (uncredited)
- The Naughty Nineties (1945) as Effie, Bonita's Cook (uncredited)
- Saratoga Trunk (1945) as Hotel Maid (uncredited)
- The Sailor Takes a Wife (1945) as Mary, Freddie's Cook (uncredited)
- Faithful in My Fashion (1946) as Celia (uncredited)
- No Leave, No Love (1946) as Maid (uncredited)
- The Time, the Place and the Girl (1946) as Jeannie, Elaine's Maid (uncredited)
- My Brother Talks to Horses (1947) as Psyche
- A Date with Judy (1948) as Nightingale (uncredited)
- Night Unto Night (1949) as Josephine (uncredited)
- Look for the Silver Lining (1949) as Violet (uncredited)
