= Night Unto Night =

1949 film by Don Siegel

Night unto Night
- Theatrical release poster
- Directed by: Don Siegel
- Screenplay by: Kathryn Scola
- Based on: Night unto Night; 1944 novel by Philip Wylie
- Produced by: Owen Crump
- Starring: Ronald Reagan; Viveca Lindfors; Broderick Crawford; Rosemary DeCamp; Osa Massen; Art Baker
- Cinematography: J. Peverell Marley
- Edited by: Thomas Reilly
- Music by: Franz Waxman
- Production company: Warner Bros. Pictures
- Distributed by: Warner Bros. Pictures
- Release date: June 10, 1949
- Running time: 84 minutes
- Country: United States
- Language: English
- Budget: $1,810,000
- Box office: $698,000

Night unto Night is a 1949 American drama film directed by Don Siegel and written by Kathryn Scola. It is based on the 1944 novel by Philip Wylie. The film stars Ronald Reagan, Viveca Lindfors, Broderick Crawford, Rosemary DeCamp, Osa Massen and Art Baker. The film was released by Warner Bros. Pictures on June 10, 1949.

Fifteen years later, Siegel directed Reagan's final film, 1964's The Killers.

== Plot ==
John Galen is in Florida, looking for a new place to live. Galen is a former scientist with epilepsy, a fact he keeps hidden from Ann Gracie, a widow who rents him her house. Ann has introduced him to her friends C.L. and Thalia Shawn, a married couple who live nearby. Ann is upset because she believes that she can still hear the voice of her late husband Bill, who was killed in the war. John has an epileptic seizure. Dr. Poole, a psychiatrist, tells him that his condition is worsening. John and C.L., an artist, have discussions of whether there is life after death. Ann's sister Lisa develops a romantic interest in John, but he falls for Ann instead. Depressed over his condition, John breaks a date with Ann and contemplates suicide. He tells Dr. Poole "Death isn't the worst thing in life, only the last." A hurricane threatens as everyone is gathered at the house John rents. John discloses his condition to Ann, who reaffirms her love for him. However, John is reluctant to continue the relationship because of his epilepsy. A drunken Lisa "congratulates" Ann on being the one to watch John deteriorate. Ann slaps Lisa and convinces John not to kill himself. The couple reunites.

== Cast ==
- Ronald Reagan as John
- Viveca Lindfors as Ann
- Broderick Crawford as C.L. Shawn
- Rosemary DeCamp as Thalia Shawn
- Osa Massen as Lisa
- Art Baker as Dr. Poole
- Craig Stevens as Tony Maddox
- Erskine Sanford as Dr. Gallen Altheim
- Ann Burr as Willa Shawn
- Johnny McGovern as Willie Shawn
- Lillian Yarbo as Josephine
- Ross Ford as Bellboy
- Almira Sessions as Hotel Maid
- Dick Elliott as Auto Court Manager

== Reception ==
“When I was directing Night unto Night, I fell in love with Viveca [Lindfors]. Consequently, she could do no wrong and I was certainly not in any position to criticise her. I just sat back and enjoyed looking at her, and she was, I must say, particularly lovely. And I did very little directing.”—Don Siegel in The Hollywood Professionals Volume 4 (1975)

According to biographer Judith M. Kass, “Night unto Night is heavily atmospheric, leaning on the wind-whipped trees, pounding water and racing clouds of Florida before hurricane for its threatening overtones.”

The film was a major box-office flop, earning $449,000 domestically and $249,000 foreign.

== Sources ==
- Kass, Judith M. (1975). Don Seigel: The Hollywood Professionals, Volume 4 (1975 ed.). New York: Tanvity Press. p. 207. ISBN 0-498-01665-X.
