= The Jack Smith Show =

1945-1952 radio program of popular music

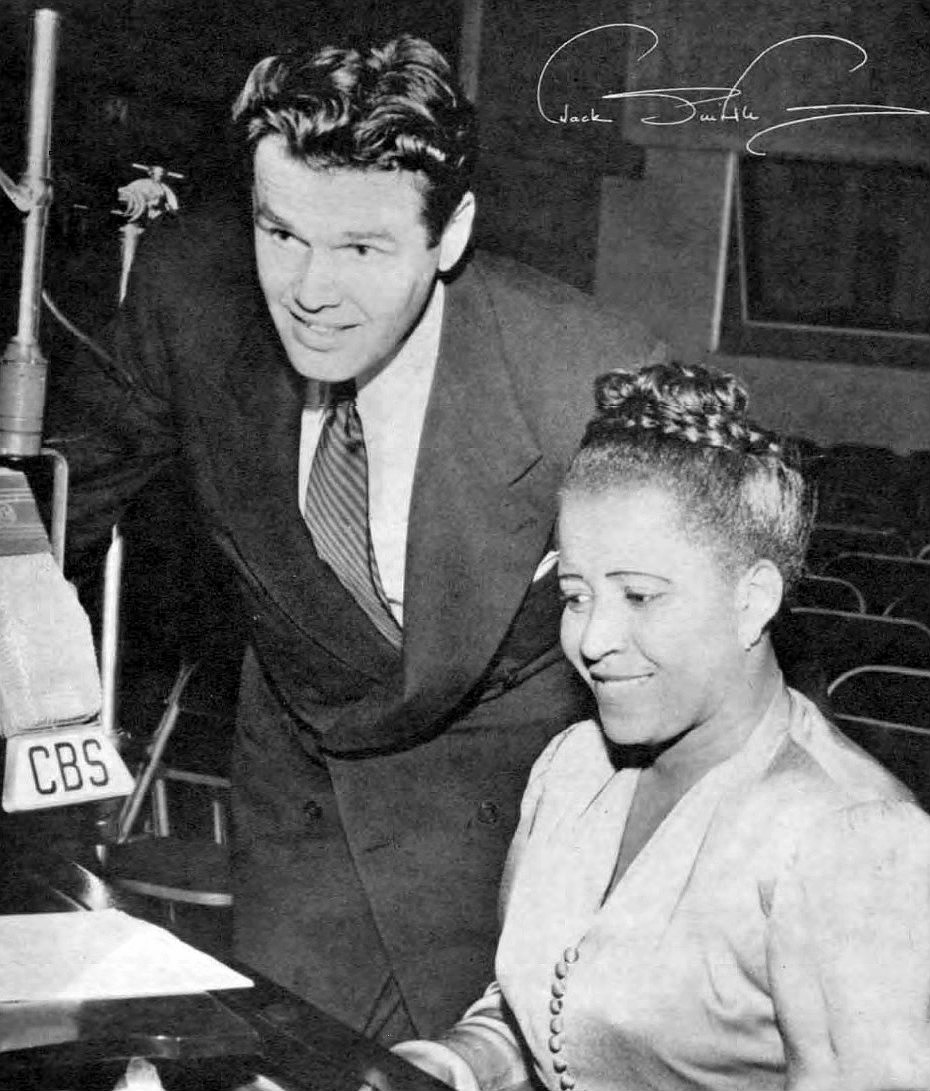
- Jack Smith with his guest, singer Nellie Lutcher, on The Jack Smith Show
- Genre: Popular music
- Running time: 15 minutes
- Country of origin: United States
- Language(s): English
- Syndicates: CBS
- Starring: Smilin' Jack Smith
- Written by: Robert Smith
- Produced by: William Brennan
- Original release: August 21, 1945 – December 26, 1952
- Sponsored by: Procter & Gamble

The Jack Smith Show was a radio program of popular music in the United States. It was broadcast on CBS Aug. 21, 1945-Dec. 26, 1952. It first originated from New York, but production was moved to Hollywood in 1948 to allow more opportunities for Smith to work in movies.

== Format ==
Starring Smilin' Jack Smith (not to be confused with Whispering Jack Smith, who was also featured on musical programs on radio), The Jack Smith Show offered light music that was "more or less contrary to the crooning style that was popular during the time." One newspaper article described the program as "a fast moving musical mélange that puts the accent on informality and music."

== Personnel ==
In addition to its star, The Jack Smith Show featured other singers as co-stars. At various times during the show's run they included Eugenie Baird, Dinah Shore, Ginny Simms, Martha Tilton, the Clark Sisters and Margaret Whiting. The program also featured guests, including Dorothy Shay, Kay Starr, Ella Fitzgerald, Martha Raye and The Pied Pipers.

Musical accompaniment was by Earl Sheldon and his orchestra and Herman Chittison Don Hancock was the announcer. William Brennan was the director.

== See also ==
- Club Fifteen and The Chesterfield Supper Club, programs similar in format to The Jack Smith Show
