= Cover Up (film) =

1949 American mystery film directed by Alfred Edward Green

- Cover Up movie poster
- Directed by: Alfred E. Green
- Written by: Jerome Odlum; Dennis O'Keefe (as Jonathan Rix); Francis Swann (additional dialogue); Lawrence Kimble (additional dialogue)
- Produced by: Ted Nasser
- Starring: Dennis O'Keefe; William Bendix; Barbara Britton
- Cinematography: Ernest Laszlo
- Edited by: Fred W. Berger
- Music by: Hans J. Salter
- Production company: Strand Productions
- Distributed by: United Artists
- Release date: February 25, 1949 (United States)
- Running time: 83 minutes
- Country: United States
- Language: English

Cover Up is a 1949 American film noir mystery starring Dennis O'Keefe, William Bendix and Barbara Britton. O'Keefe also co-wrote the screenplay, credited as Jonathan Rix. Directed by Alfred E. Green, the picture takes place during the Christmas season.

== Plot ==
Insurance investigator Sam Donovan (O'Keefe) arrives in a small Midwestern town west of Chicago to investigate a recent death. Leaving the train, he meets attractive young Anita Weatherby (Britton), who fumbles with an armload of Christmas gifts he helps her corral. They take the same bus to Cleberg, forming a mutual attraction.

The Weatherby family is there to greet Anita, father Stu, president of the local bank, beaming beneath his signature heirloom beaver coat. Mistaking the handsome man for a beau being brought home to meet them over the Holidays - and if anything disappointed to discover he is not - they invite Donovan to drop by the house.

At the Marlowe County sheriff's office Donovan learns from a reticent Sheriff Larry Best (Bendix) that local curmudgeon Roger Phillips' death appears to be a suicide. A cursory probe disagrees: there were no powder burns on the victim, no pistol was found, no bullet retrieved, and there is no coroner's report. Nor is Sheriff Best in any rush to get one. Donovan smells murder.

Leaving Best's office in high dudgeon, he is halted by the tinkling of a bullet and shell casing before the door can slam. Donovan immediately identifies them as coming from a Luger. Best indicates the pistols are not uncommon in town (as many had been brought home as war prizes by recently returned veterans of World War II) and volunteers even he owns one.

An interview with the local jeweler who found Phillips' body yields nothing but a stonewall. Any way Donovan turns the message is the same: Phillips was roundly hated, nobody is sorry he was dead, and no-one cares how.

Even the policy's double-indemnity payout for murder is not enough to elicit cooperation from its beneficiary, Phillips' niece Margaret Baker, nor her newly wed husband, Frank, Donovan's top suspect. The couple had quarreled with Phillips over his objection to their marriage, then left for the bus station to elope. Frank claims he stayed there, Donovan has his doubts.

With Christmas shortly approaching everything begins to drag, and Donovan is forced to stay longer in town than he had anticipated. Best encourages the dogged gumshoe to just relax and have a good time. He can't: he has a job to do, and his company is on the hook for an extra $20,000 if the death proves to have been murder...but a chance sighting of Anita steers him avidly in the pursuit of l' amour.

When Donovan calls on her, the Weatherbys welcome him and begins courting her. Her father, Stu, is supportive, her mother, Bessie, approves of the match, and her younger sister, Cathie quickly becomes infatuated with him. Meanwhile, the family's longtime maid Hilda—who frequently meddles in household affairs—is charmed by Donovan, as well, though she remains suspicious of him.

At the annual town Christmas tree lighting the residents are grieved to learn that beloved longtime physician Dr. Gerrow, who presides over the festivity and delivered half the folks in the crowd, has died of a heart attack. Complications ensue when Donovan finds that Stu had owned a Luger he'd brought back from World War I, but given to Gerrow for his gun collection some months earlier.

Seeking to hide her diary from her prying sister, Anita accidentally stumbles into her father's Luger, secreted in the Weatherby home. She immediately suspects him of the killing, and conceals her discovery.

To smoke the murderer out Donovan plants a story in the local newspaper stating that he has summoned a forensic police chemist to uncover clues of the killer's identity still present at the Phillips home. The dried residue of a puddle of water found near the deceased's body is sure to include fibers from the assailant's jacket, or other telltales shed of it.

The town grows atwitter at the prospect. Hilda burns Stu's heirloom beaver coat, caught in the act by Donovan.

With the scientist's arrival imminent, Donovan heads to the Phillips home. Sheriff Best beats him there, correctly suspecting the story had been a fake. The two face off to a tense stalemate. Stu arrives next, with Anita hot on his heels.

Donovan accuses Stu of the crime, but when reenacting it realizes the murderer could not have been right-handed. Immediately, it gels for him that Dr. Gerrow's pen holder had been on the opposite side of the desk when he'd once reached for it to leave a note, and Gerrow had stood out as a southpaw in a photograph of a four-man pistol team hanging amid his gun collection. Weatherby then confesses what had happened: he'd come upon Gerrow just after the doctor had snapped and shot the man responsible for so many decades of misery among the townsfolk. Taking the Luger away, he'd talked Gerrow out of turning himself in until after the Holidays.

Swayed by Weatherby and Best, Donovan finally concludes that the town will be better off if Dr. Gerrow's memory is preserved. With an eye toward settling there - and wedding Anita - he agrees to keep his company paperwork trail buried, and see that the $20,000 murder indemnity is quietly paid to a charity as Margaret has requested. All are in accord on his Solomonic solution to the town's trial.

== Cast ==
- Dennis O'Keefe as Sam Donovan
- William Bendix as Sheriff Larry Best
- Barbara Britton as Anita Weatherby
- Art Baker as Stu Weatherby
- Ann E. Todd as Cathie Weatherby
- Doro Merande as Hilda
- Virginia Christine as Margaret Baker
- Helen Spring as Bessie Weatherby
- Ruth Lee as Mrs. Abbey
- Henry Hall as Mayor
- Russell Armes as Frank Baker
- Dan White as Gabe
- Paul E. Burns as Mr. Abbey
- Emmett Vogan as Blakely
- Jamesson Shade as Editor
- Jack Lee as Addison
- Worden Norten as Undertaker
- George MacDonald as Boy in Movie Theatre

== Production ==
According to Madeleine Stowe, guest host of the May 21, 2016, Turner Classic Movies screening of Cover Up, the producer initially resisted the holiday timeframe for the film, feeling the subject was unsuitable for a Christmas setting. Star Dennis O'Keefe, who also co-wrote the script, strongly protested, and carried the day.

This was the first film produced by O'Keefe's new production company, Strand Productions, according to Stowe.

== Preservation ==
Cover Up was preserved and restored by the UCLA Film and Television Archive from two 35mm nitrate composite prints. Restoration funding provided by The Packard Humanities Institute in collaboration with the Library of Congress. The restoration premiered at the UCLA Festival of Preservation in 2022.
