= You Asked for It =

- Also known as: The Art Baker Show
- Presented by: Art Baker (1950–1958); Jack Smith (1958–1959)
- Country of origin: United States
- Original language: English

Production
- Running time: 30 minutes

Original release
- Network: DuMont (Dec 1950-Dec 1951); ABC (Jan 1952-Sept 1959)
- Release: December 29, 1950 – September 27, 1959

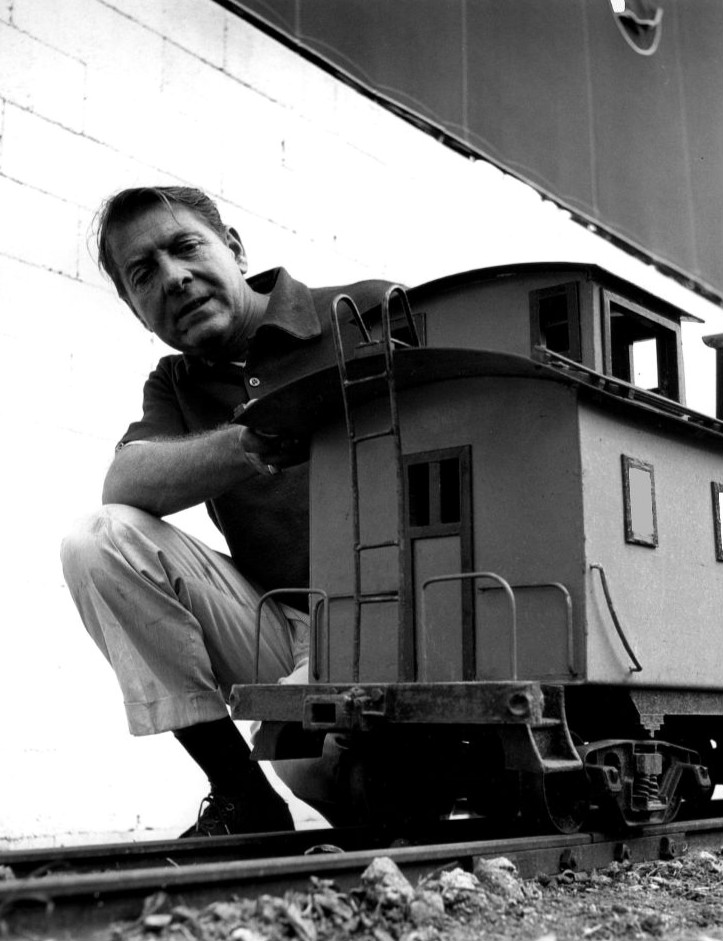
David Rose showing one of his miniature trains (ABC, 1959)

You Asked for It is a human interest television show created and hosted by Art Baker. Initially titled The Art Baker Show, the program originally aired on American television between 1950 and 1959. Later versions of the series were seen in 1972, 1981, and 2000.

On the show, viewers were asked to send in postcards describing something that they wanted to see on television, such as the reenactment of William Tell shooting an apple off his son's head. (1950 US national archery champion Stan Overby performed the feat, shooting an apple off his assistant's head.)

The show was originally broadcast live, so some of the riskier propositions took on added elements of danger and suspense. A segment where animal trainer and stuntman, Reed Parham wrestled a huge, deadly anaconda, for example, nearly became disastrous until assistants interceded with guns drawn, visibly unnerving host Art Baker.

== Guest stars ==
Baker was fond of granting requests to see show-business personalities. He reunited the Our Gang troupe of the 1920s (Johnny Downs, Joe Cobb, Mickey Daniels, Allen "Farina" Hoskins, and Jackie Condon), and staged encore performances by singers Gloria Jean, Nick Lucas and Arthur Lee Simpkins; comedians Buster Keaton, Eddie Gribbon, and El Brendel with his wife Flo Bert; actor Bela Lugosi, cowboy bullwhip artist Whip Wilson, and ventriloquist performer Harry Lester among many others.

Short film clips were also presented, with the selection based upon viewer requests. As a consequence, many of the clips were presented multiple times. Some of the more popular clips included a tour of the bizarre Winchester Mystery House and the collapse of the first Tacoma Narrows Bridge.

The program was named The Art Baker Show, after the series creator and host. In April 1951, the show’s title was changed to You Asked for It. Originally airing on the DuMont Television Network from December 29, 1950, to December 7, 1951, it moved to ABC, where it remained until the end of its original run on September 27, 1959. The show was sponsored by Skippy Peanut Butter and Studebaker Automobiles.

Art Baker hosted the show until early 1958, when Jack Smith took over for the remaining 20 months.

During the Smith years, memorable segments included a profile of Dr. John Ott's elaborate automated time-lapse multiple camera greenhouse filming the growth of plants (plugging his 1958 book My Ivory Cellar), a man who wanted to see his bit part in a silent movie after about forty years, and how a dangerous fire collapsing building stunt sequence was filmed with stunt people rolling into a hidden pit at the last possible second.

== Later versions ==
After ABC canceled the original show in 1959, various revivals have aired in the decades since:

- An all-new version of You Asked for It began to air in syndication in 1972 and was also hosted by Jack Smith.
- In 1981, another syndicated version went on the air as The New You Asked for It, with impressionist Rich Little as the host and Jayne Kennedy as co-host. Jack Smith served as a narrator on this version, voicing the clips from the older shows, and took over as host in the show's second season. This incarnation lasted until the summer of 1983.
- The Family Channel had a version of their own from 1991 to 1992 called You Asked for It, Again with Jimmy Brogan as the host.
- In spring of 2000, a short-lived version, hosted by comedian Phil Morris, aired on NBC.

== In popular culture ==
In the Happy Days episode "Fearless Fonzarelli" (aired September 30, 1975), Fonzie (Henry Winkler) jumps his motorcycle over fourteen garbage cans. The feat attracts the cameras of the fictional (though thinly-veiled) You Wanted to See It, with the real Jack Smith playing himself. You Wanted to See It shows up again in the Weezer video "Buddy Holly" which shows the band playing at Arnold's Drive-In, a popular diner in the Happy Days sitcom.

A parody of the show called You're Asking for It was featured in the Bugs Bunny cartoon Wideo Wabbit (1956).

The post office box number for the original series, 323, would later become the namesake for Hollywood's area code.

Another parody called You Wanted It was featured in the "I Want To" episode of the PBS series Inside/Out.

This was also an episode of Tiny Toon Adventures.

== Bibliography ==
- David Weinstein, The Forgotten Network: DuMont and the Birth of American Television (Philadelphia: Temple University Press, 2004) ISBN 1-59213-245-6
- Alex McNeil, Total Television, Fourth edition (New York: Penguin Books, 1980) ISBN 0-14-024916-8
- Tim Brooks and Earle Marsh, The Complete Directory to Prime Time Network TV Shows, Third edition (New York: Ballantine Books, 1964) ISBN 0-345-31864-1

== See also ==
- List of programs broadcast by the DuMont Television Network
- List of surviving DuMont Television Network broadcasts
