= Reggie Schell =

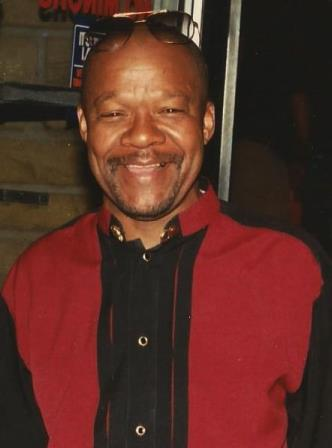
- Reggie Schell in 1998
- Born: Richard Reginald Schell; July 6, 1941; Philadelphia, Pennsylvania
- Died: May 9, 2012 (aged 70); Philadelphia, Pennsylvania
- Other name: Captain Reggie
- Organization(s): Black Panther Party (1969–1970); Black United Liberation Front (1970–1978), Black Power Movement, Black Liberation Movement

Richard Reginald Schell (July 6, 1941 – May 9, 2012), better known as Captain Reggie Schell, was an American political activist who was a member of the Philadelphia chapter of the Black Panther Party from early 1969 to late 1970. He then founded a Philadelphia grassroots organization called the Black United Liberation Front in which he was the chairman from 1970 to 1978.
