= Standard Theatre (Philadelphia) =

Theatre in Philadelphia, Pennsylvania, U.S. (1888–1957)

- New Standard Theatre
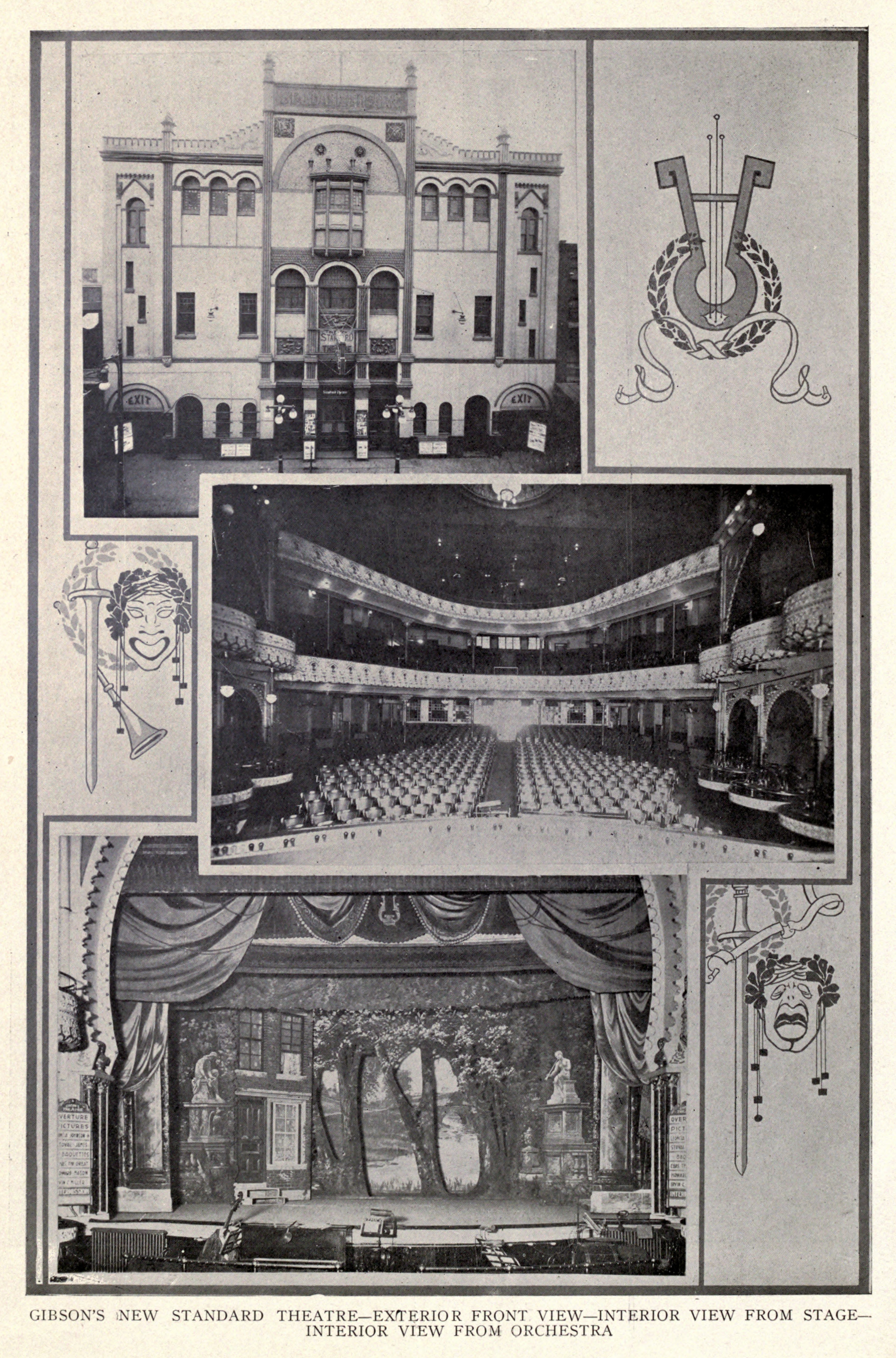
- John T. Gibson's New Standard Theatre, 1126 South St., Philadelphia, Pennsylvania (1919)
- Interactive map of Standard Theatre
- Address: 1126 South Street; Philadelphia, Pennsylvania; United States
- Coordinates: 39.9430°N 75.1608°W
- Owner: Joseph W. Cummings (1880s–1914); John T. Gibson (1914–1931)
- Type: Theatre
- Events: Vaudeville; Black Vaudeville; musicals; circus; music; cinema

Construction
- Opened: 1888
- Closed: 1954
- Demolished: 1957

The Standard Theatre showcased Philadelphia's most talented African-American performers and jazz musicians in the early twentieth century. During its peak years (1915–1930), the Standard was one of Philadelphia's most famous and successful black theaters. Its exceptional success can be attributed to its owner, John T. Gibson, an African-American man who envisioned affordable entertainment for people of color.

== Opening ==
The Standard Theatre (or Standard Theater) originally opened in 1888 on the 1100 block of South Street. It was primarily a venue for local and traveling vaudeville programs. The Standard was located near Philadelphia's neighborhoods with the highest black population: for instance, 23% of Philadelphia's African-American citizens lived in the 7th ward of South Philadelphia alone. The theater would occasionally showcase African-American productions, such as in November 1897, when the theater presented Bob Cole and William Johnson's A Trip to Coontown, a musical created and performed by African-American men. In spite of this, the Standard maintained segregated admissions, alienating many of the African-American residents in the neighborhood.

Before 1914, the Standard Theatre had seen occasional yet sporadic African-American ownership. For example, a group of African-American investors from New York City, led by Gibson Young, leased the theater in 1913 with the promise of "altogether coloured management". In spite of its initial great success, business declined. By October of that year, the Standard was again leased to non–African Americans, which returned to practicing segregation. This was a great emotional loss to the African-American community, who saw the Standard Theater finally becoming a site of entertainment for their own color.

== Purchase ==
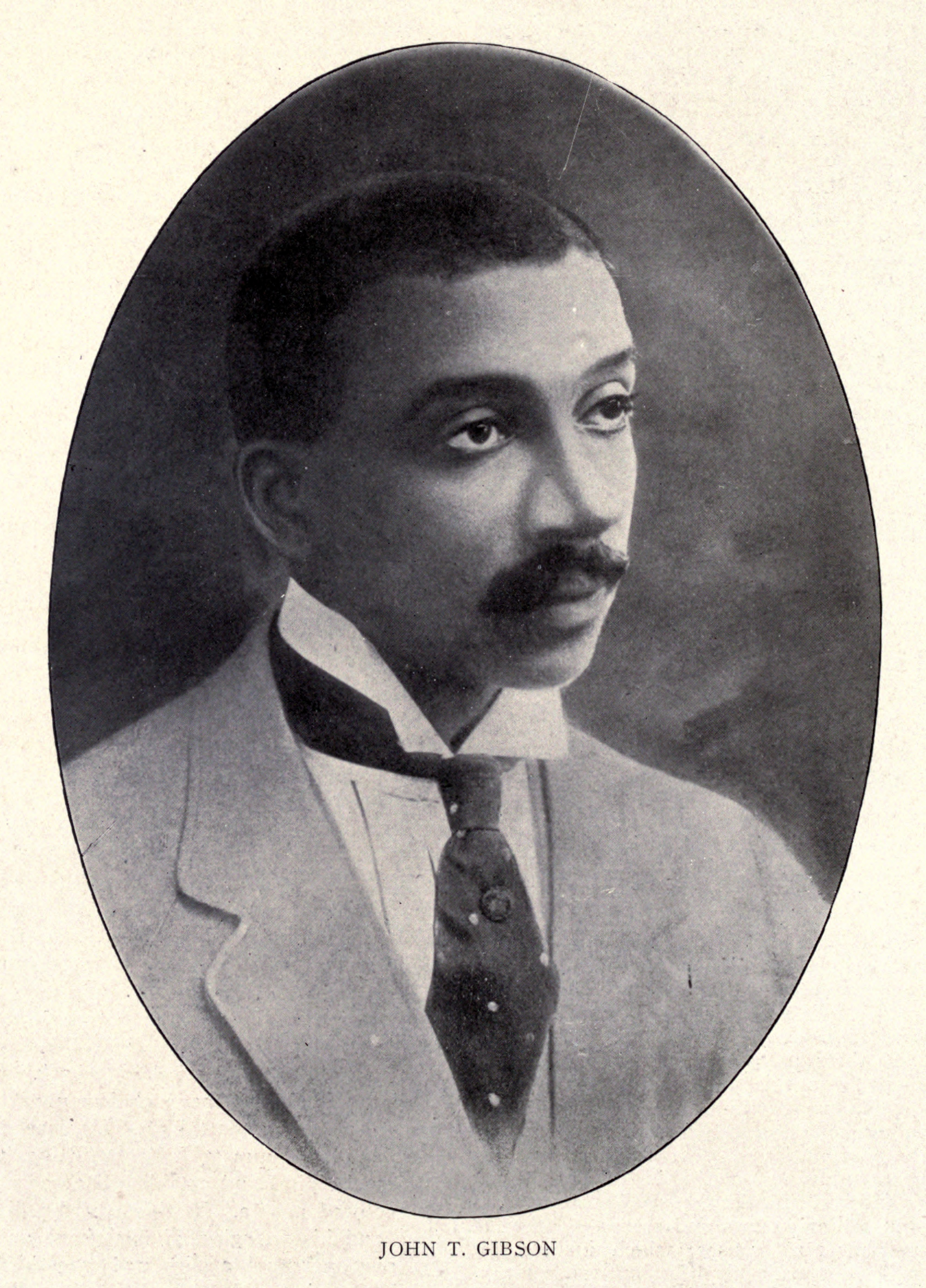
John T. Gibson (1919)

John T. Gibson (1878–1937) leased the Standard Theatre in January 1914 and purchased it from Joseph W. Cummings later in the year. In an interview almost two years after his purchase, Gibson said the following: "When I bought the New Standard theater, I felt that there was a field in this city for good clean Negro vaudeville at popular prices." Gibson's premiere show opened with J. Leubrie Hill's Darktown Follies, a musical comedy featuring Southern rural characters. The Indianapolis Freeman described the event as a "decided success" and one that "Philadelphia can be proud of ... the citizens will rally around Manager Gibson." The original ticket prices ranged from 25 cents to $1.00. In May, Gibson officially bought the Standard, becoming its sale owner and manager. At this point, the theater was valued at $70,000, making it one of the most valuable pieces of property owned by a single black man in the country.

In its first two years, the Standard Theatre presented a variety of performances at low cost. The musical repertoire included southern folk songs, antebellum plantation songs, vaudeville numbers, musicals, and blues. The theater also showed fantastic performances, including magicians, acrobats, and animal performances. For example, a performance in February 1915 featured the Monkey Cabaret Orchestra, consisting of eight monkeys in the orchestra who accompanied more monkeys performing on stage with a dog. Gibson took pride in his performers. When asked by a reporter what the theater relied on most, he replied "Good acts, well acted ... it has been and will continue to be my method to regard the actor as a medium and not as a marionette." In November 1915, Gibson finished renovations on the Standard Theatre. The renovations included newly painted interior, gilded ceilings, and increased seating to 2,000. While renovating his theater, Gibson employed African-American painters, artists, and construction workers in his efforts to spread wealth among the African-American citizens in the area. After this point, Gibson claimed to have a standing offer for $180,000 for the theater, which he regularly declined: "Commercialism has nothing whatever to go with my project", he said; "My idea is to give my people the best of it all the time."

By 1918, The Standard Theatre's success made John T. Gibson the richest African-American man in the state of Pennsylvania. In 1919, he was estimated to be worth $600,000. The Standard Theatre was one of only 59 theaters owned by a single person in Philadelphia. The Washington Bee credited his success to his optimism loyalty to African-Americans: "Despite his great wealth, Mr. Gibson is a race man. His affections are remarkably developed. His heart is large. It is necessary at times to retrain his willingness. He is an apostle of optimism. His wide, his home, his theater, his city, his state, his country are the finest. There is no limit to their possibilities."

== 1920s ==
During the 1920s, the Standard Theatre peaked in its success. A major factor in this success was increased ticket sales. Massive audience turnouts resulted in part from new waves of African-American Philadelphians. In the beginning of the twentieth century, millions of African-American Americans fled to northern cities, escaping southern segregation and Jim Crow laws. This movement became known as the Great Migration. In the 1910s, Philadelphia's African-American population increased by 50%, reading a total of 134,220. This growth continued through the twenties, reaching 219,559 by 1930. Newly arrived performers and audience members alike sought out theaters that hired and catered to African-American Philadelphians. In the early 1920s, the Standard embodied African-American entertainment in Philadelphia. Gibson responded to growing audiences and monetary success by purchasing the nearby Dunbar Theatre in 1921.

In the 1920s, jazz flourished in Philadelphia. Jazz music infiltrated the mainstream music culture, receiving praise from more conventional musicians. For instance, the conductor of the Philadelphia Orchestra, Leopold Stokowski, compared jazz music to "the injection of new ... blood into a dying aristocracy." As jazz music became more recognized as socially respectable music, the Standard's audiences became more integrated as non-African-American Philadelphians came to more shows. While the shows had always been integrated, the increased number of non-African-American audience members contributed to Gibson's high earnings. Perhaps reacting to the influx of non-African-American audience members, African-American critics began to change their tastes in performances. Sandy Burns, a comedian who specialized in blackface performance, received rave reviews from Indianapolis Freeman papers in the teens. But by 1926, his performance received scathing reviews, and he was criticized as "a past master at portraying the old razor-slashing Negro." While vaudeville comedy still lit the stage, Gibson changed his focus to musical performers, specifically big bands. It is during this period that the Standard Theatre showcased some of the top names in jazz at the time. In 1927, Duke Ellington and his Washingtonians performed for two weeks there. In December 1929, Louis Armstrong performed in the Standard, fronting for the Luis Russell Band. Following Ellington's and Armstrong's lead, numerous big band leaders added the Standard as a stopping point on their tours.

== Closing ==
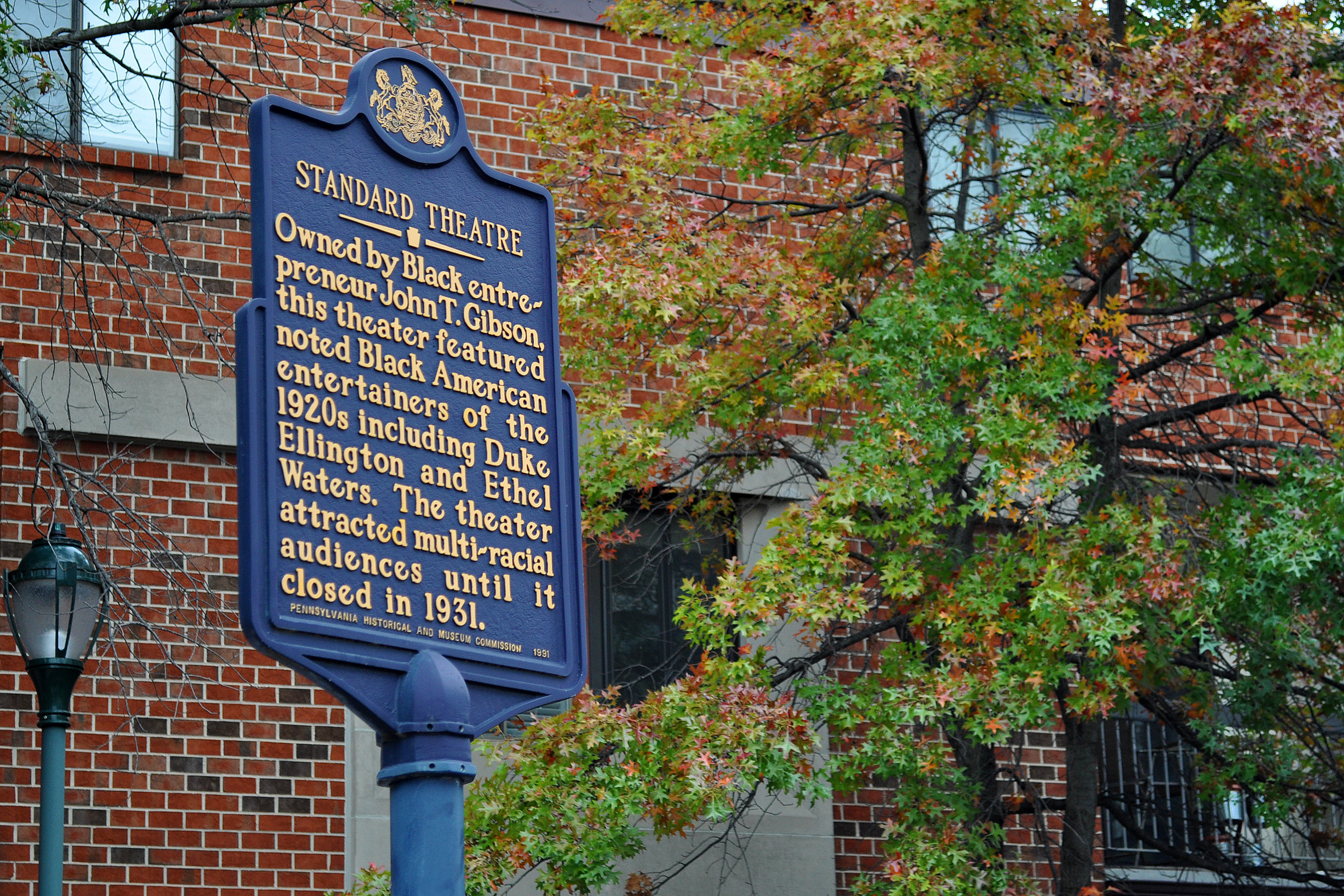
Standard Theatre historical marker, Pennsylvania Historical and Museum Commission, 1991

In 1931, Gibson sold the Standard Theatre due to his losses from the Great Depression. As big band music began its decline, the Standard Theatre was turned into a movie theater, losing its performance space for live musicians and performers. The theater officially closed in 1954 and was demolished in 1957. In 1992, the Pennsylvania Historical and Museum Commission placed a historical marker to commemorate the theater and its owner. It is placed at the theater's original location, on the 11th block of South Street.

== Other notable performers ==
A young Ethel Waters found inspiration in the performances she saw at the Standard. Early in her career, she often imitated acts she had seen when performing in other cities. In 1917, she returned to Philadelphia and performed at the Standard: "My return to Philadelphia turned into something of a triumph when we were booked for two weeks at the Standard Theatre, where I'd watched shows from the peanut gallery. It was still the city's leading Negro showhouse, and the engagement meant I was recognized in my home town as an established professional performer." Although Waters moved to New York in 1919, she would still perform at the Standard whenever she passed through Philadelphia, most notably performing for a week in June 1928.

The Whitman Sisters consisted of four sisters (Essie, Mabel, Alberta, and Baby Alice) who performed vaudeville routines all along the eastern coast. Their acts included tap dancing, musical numbers, comedy sketches, and crossdressing. The Whitman Sisters regularly performed at the Standard throughout the late teens as the star act of the show.

Bessie Smith began to regularly perform at the Standard in 1923. Although she spent time touring around the country, she settled in Philadelphia, bringing her family with her. According to the jazz trombonist Clyde Bernhardt, "Bessie Smith's sister, Viola, had a restaurant called Viola's Place across from the Standard Theater on South Street. Bessie put up the money for it".
