= Smilin' Jack Smith =

Crooner, radio host and actor

Jack Smith
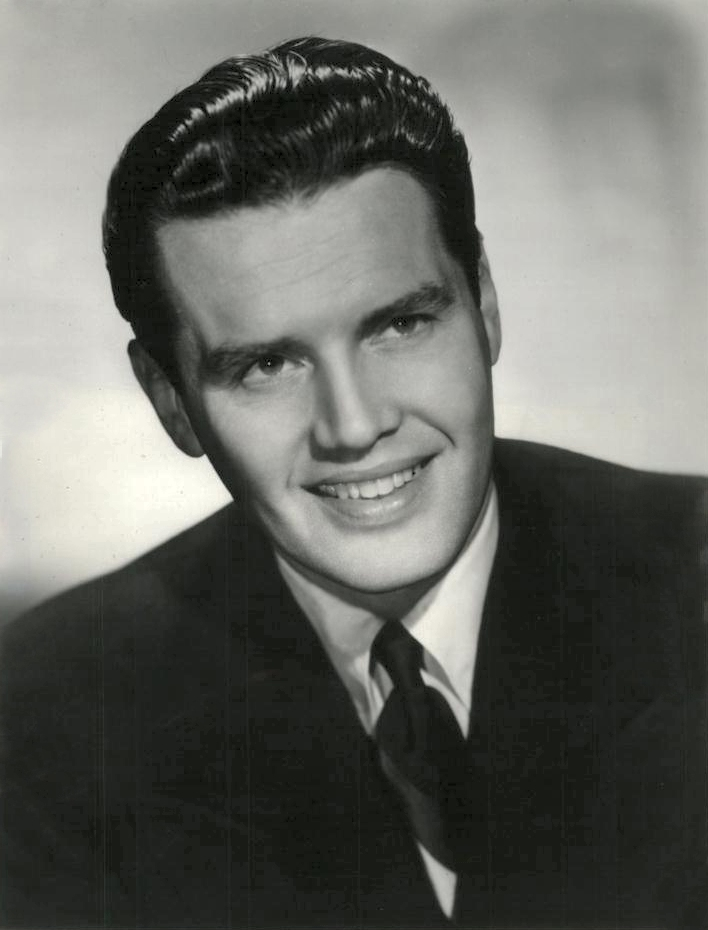
- Smith in 1958.
- Born: John Ward Smith; November 16, 1913; Seattle, Washington, U.S.
- Died: July 3, 2006 (aged 92); Westlake Village, California, U.S.
- Other names: Smilin' Jack Smith
- Years active: 1933–1991
- Spouse: Victoria Stuart (m. 1936–2002) (her death)
- Relatives: Walter Reed (brother)

John Ward Smith (November 16, 1913 – July 3, 2006), known as Smilin' Jack Smith, was an American crooner, radio host and actor.

Born in Seattle, Washington, United States, by 1933 Smith was in a singing trio, The Three Ambassadors. In 1939, he became a solo crooner with a voice described as a "strong baritone with a tenor lilt"; he was billed as "The Singer with a Smile in His Voice." He also sang with the Phil Harris Orchestra, recording "Here It is Only Monday".

Establishing a radio program, The Jack Smith Show, in 1945, he went on to host such guests as Dinah Shore, Margaret Whiting, John Serry Sr. and Ginny Simms. In a 1945 poll of radio critics by Motion Picture Daily, Smith was voted radio's "most promising star of tomorrow."

Following a guest appearance in the musical film Make Believe Ballroom (1949), Smith was offered the second lead in Warner Bros.' On Moonlight Bay (1951) opposite Doris Day.

With the television's arrival, radio saw a decline in audiences, and Smith lost his show in 1952. In 1953, Smith briefly hosted the NBC game show Place the Face, only to be replaced by Jack Bailey, who in turn was followed by Bill Cullen. Smith became the host of You Asked For It in 1958, staying with it in various roles until 1991. He also appeared as himself in the "Fearless Fonzarelli" episode of Happy Days, aired in 1975; in that episode, Smith hosted You Wanted To See It, a fictionalized version of his real show, bearing witness to Fonzie's feat of leaping 14 garbage cans on his motorcycle.

Jack Smith died in June 2006 in Westlake Village, California of leukemia, aged 92.

== Filmography ==
Year	Title	Role	Notes
1933	King Kong	Reporter	Uncredited
1936	Walking on Air	Singer at dance	Uncredited
1949	Make Believe Ballroom	Singer Jack Smith	
1951	On Moonlight Bay	Hubert Wakely	
1971	The Barefoot Executive	Clathworthy	
1984	Cannonball Run II	Announcer Jack Smith	(final film role)
