= John T. Gibson =

African-American businessman and theatre manager (1878–1937)

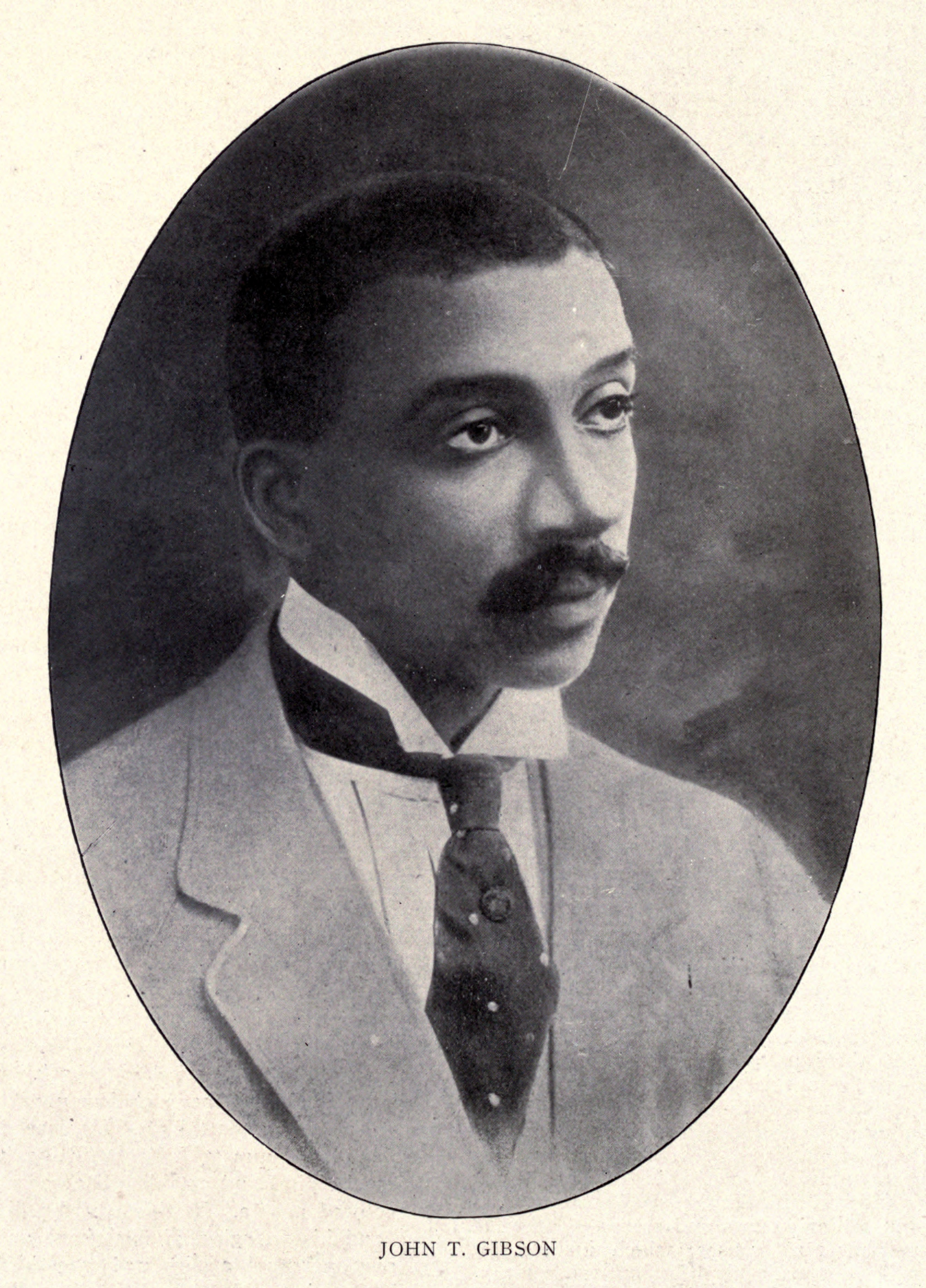
- Gibson in 1919
- Born: John Trusty Gibson; February 4, 1878; Baltimore, Maryland, U.S.
- Died: June 17, 1937 (aged 59); Philadelphia, Pennsylvania, U.S.
- Education: Morgan College Preparatory School
- Occupations: Businessman; theatrical producer; manager; real estate investor
- Years active: 1910–1920s
- Organization(s): Managers and Performers vaudeville circuit
- Known for: Owning and managing the Standard Theatre and Dunbar Theatre

John Trusty Gibson (February 4, 1878 – June 17, 1937) was an African-American businessman, theatrical producer, manager, and real estate investor, who was one of the pioneers of black entertainment in Philadelphia, Pennsylvania. He was the wealthiest African-American in Philadelphia in the 1920s due to his ownership of the Standard and Dunbar theatres and management of various African-American vaudeville and black musical acts. He was appointed the vice president of the Managers and Performers vaudeville circuit in 1922.

== Early life and career ==
Gibson, the son of George Henry and Elizabeth Johns Gibson, was born on February 4, 1878, and grew up in Baltimore. He was nicknamed "Little Giant" and graduated from Morgan College Preparatory School. He later received an honorary LLD degree from the school in June 1928.

Gibson moved to Philadelphia in 1899. He initially worked in various odd jobs and had stints peddling meat and caning chairs before moving into the theatrical world in 1910, when Samuel Reading hired him as a partner in his movie and vaudeville theatre, the North Pole. Though the North Pole theatre would ultimately not be a success, Gibson remained optimistic and bought out Reading for $800. Gibson married Ella on September 15, 1914.

== Theatre and real estate ==
Gibson acquired the Standard Theatre from Joseph W. Cummings on South Street, Philadelphia, in July 1914. The theatre thrived, with Gibson booking the likes of Bylow and Ashes, singers Bessie Smith and Ethel Waters, Erma C. Miller's "Brown Skinned Models" (known as the "Black Rockettes"), and jazz bands led by the likes of Louis Armstrong and Duke Ellington. He became the wealthiest black man in the city in the 1920s after purchasing the Dunbar theatre from E. C. Brown and Andrew Stevens in 1921 for $420,000. Gibson bought a large estate in Whitemarsh (neighboring the John Wanamaker Estate), a home in West Philadelphia, and a red Pierce-Arrow car with his own personal chauffeur. He invested heavily in real estate. On July 24, 1922, Billboard announced that Gibson had been appointed the vice president of the Managers and Performers vaudeville circuit.

Despite his wealth and success, Gibson was ruined by the Great Depression near the end of the 1920s and was forced to sell both the Standard and Dunbar theatres, which later became cinemas. The Depression left him close to poverty in his final years. He died on June 17, 1937.
