= Dunbar Theatre (Philadelphia) =

Theatre in Philadelphia, Pennsylvania, U.S. (1919–1940s)

- Gibson Theatre; Lincoln Theatre
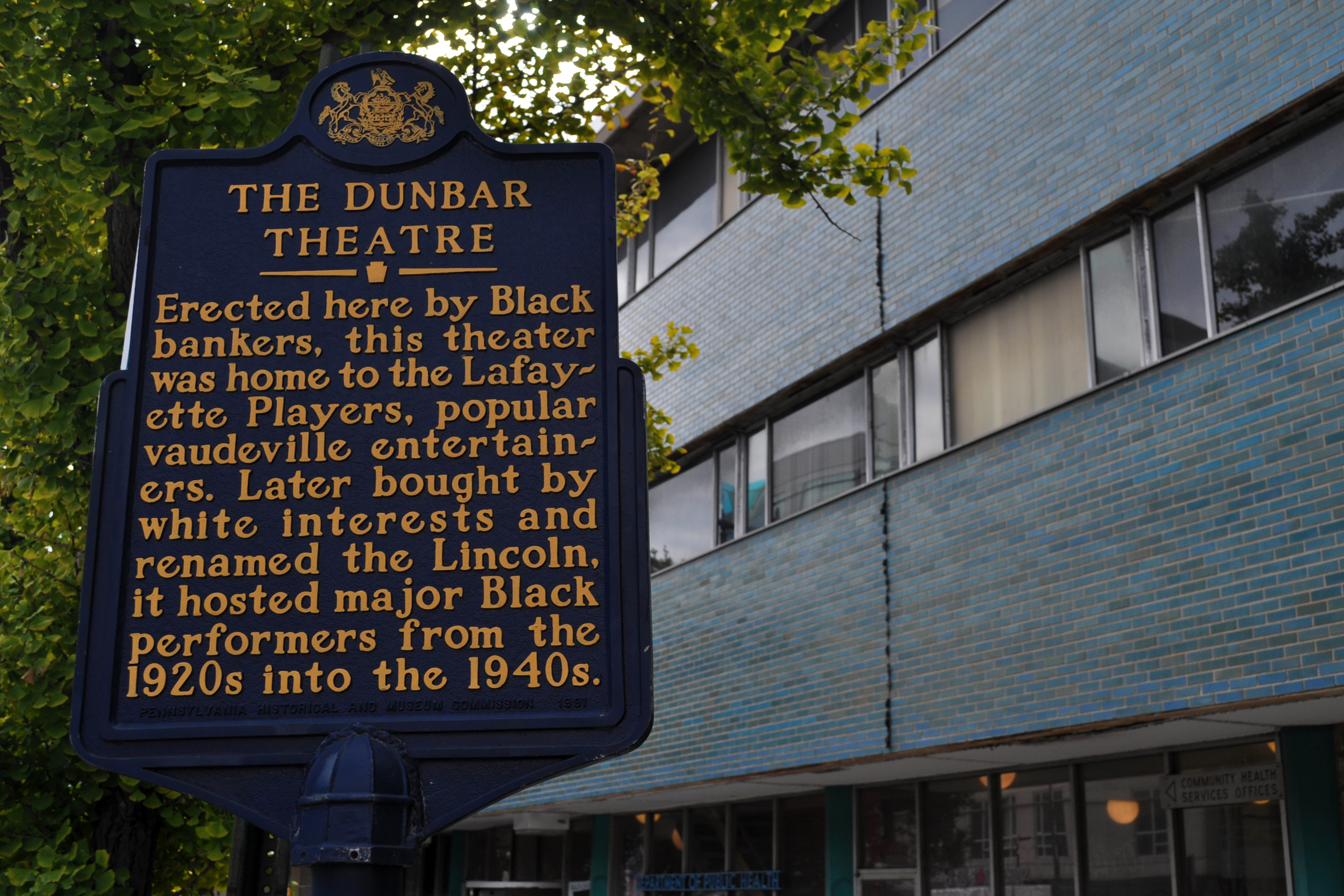
- Dunbar Theatre historical marker, Pennsylvania Historical and Museum Commission, 1991
- Interactive map of Dunbar Theatre
- Address: 500 South Broad Street; Philadelphia, Pennsylvania; United States
- Coordinates: 39°56′40″N 75°09′56″W
- Owner: E. C. Brown & Andrew Stevens Jr. (1919–1921); John T. Gibson (1921–1929); Irvin C. Miller (1929–1940s)
- Type: Theatre
- Events: Vaudeville; music

Construction
- Opened: December 29, 1919

Dunbar Theatre was a 1600-seat theatre and jazz club on the corner of Lombard Street and Broad Street in Philadelphia, Pennsylvania. It opened in 1919 and was later called the Gibson Theatre and Lincoln Theatre.

== History ==
The Dunbar Theatre was opened on December 29, 1919, by the African-American bankers E. C. Brown and Andrew Stevens Jr. with a performance from the Lafayette Theatre group from Harlem, who were raising money for the NAACP and Marcus Garvey. They performed Shuffle Along at Dunbar, before moving to Broadway where it premiered as the first all-black cast and production. Brown and Stevens ran into financial difficulty, and in September 1921, the theatre was sold to businessman John T. Gibson, who bought it for $420,000, offering a 10% share to another partner. The club, which was renamed the Gibson Theatre, along with the Standard Theatre made Gibson the wealthiest African-American in Philadelphia in the 1920s.

Despite his wealth and the club's success, Gibson was ruined by the Great Depression, and the theatre was sold to Jewish owners in December 1929, who renamed it the Lincoln Theatre. As early as October 1928, it was announced that Irvin C. Miller would take over the theatre.

It flourished as a jazz venue in the 1930s and 1940s, with performances from the likes of Duke Ellington, Lena Horne, and the Nicholas Brothers.

Today, there is a historical marker sign at 500 South Broad Street on the southwest corner of Broad and Lombard Streets in the city remembering the theatre and its role in history as a successful venue for black performers of the 1920s to 1940s.
