= Black Renaissance in D.C. =

African-American cultural movement in Washington DC

Black Renaissance in DC
- Part of the Harlem Renaissance in the Roaring Twenties
- Date: July 19, 1919 to 1926 (approx.)
- Location: Washington, D.C., United States and influences from Harlem, New York and Paris, France
- Also known as: Harlem Renaissance in D.C.
- Participants: Various artists and social critics
- Outcome: Mainstream recognition of cultural developments and idea of New Negro

The Black Renaissance in D.C. was a social, intellectual, and cultural movement in Washington, D.C. that began in 1919 and continued into the late 1920s.

== Background ==
Before the start of the Harlem Renaissance, Washington, D.C. developed an educated and prosperous Black middle class, made up of Black intellectuals and scholars who often studied at Howard University. Washington, D.C. had the country's largest Black community from 1900 to 1920, heavily influencing the development of the Black Renaissance in the area.

While the Black Renaissance movement ultimately began in Harlem, Manhattan, New York, with the Harlem Renaissance, the movement ultimately spread to cities across the United States. In Washington, D.C., the movement began on July 19, 1919, with the alleged sexual assault of a white woman by a black predator. The event was never confirmed, but it incited inflammatory responses from the four daily newspapers in the city. Several hundred whites formed a mob near Murder Bay off of Pennsylvania Avenue, a neighborhood known for prostitution and violence. The mob went on to assault a Black couple who were walking on 9th and D Streets, Southwest. Many prominent figures in the Harlem movement had strong roots in Washington, D.C. and heavily influenced the movement there.

== Development ==
=== Music ===
U Street and Shaw was known as a place of entertainment and jazz music during this era. As a result of its cultural importance, U street was often referred to as "Black Broadway".

== Important figures ==
- Lewis Grandison Alexander
- Gwendolyn Bennett
- Marita Bonner
- Sterling Allen Brown
- Carrie Williams Clifford
- William Waring Cuney
- Clarissa M. Scott Delany
- Thelma Myrtle Duncan
- Duke Ellington
- Jessie Fauset
- Rudolph Fisher
- T. Montgomery Gregory
- Angelina Weld Grimke
- Frank Smith Horne
- Langston Hughes
- Zora Neale Hurston
- Georgia Douglas Johnson
- Alain LeRoy Locke
- Florence Mills
- Richard Bruce Nugent
- James A. Porter
- Willis Richardson
- Addison Scurlock
- Jean Toomer
- James Lesesne Wells
- Edward Christopher Williams

== See also ==
- African-American art
- African-American culture
- African-American literature
- Black Arts Movement
- Blackbirds of 1928
- Chicago Black Renaissance
- Encyclopedia of the Harlem Renaissance (book)
- Harlem Renaissance
- List of African-American visual artists
- List of female entertainers of the Harlem Renaissance
- List of figures from the Harlem Renaissance
- New Negro
- The New Negro: The Life of Alain Locke
- Niggerati
- Roaring Twenties
- Shuffle Along
- William E. Harmon Foundation award
