= Ruth Gaines-Shelton =

American playwright and educator

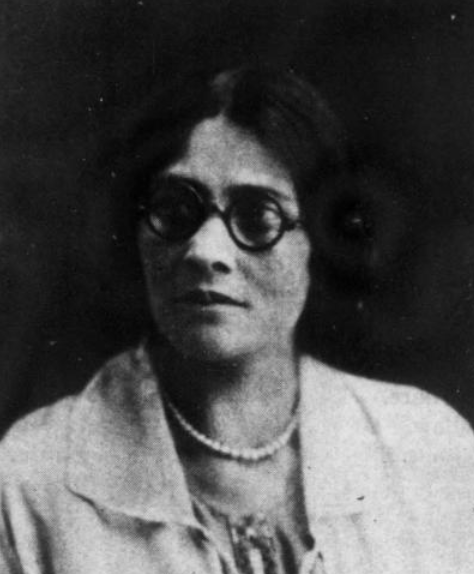
- Ruth A. Gaines-Shelton, from a 1926 publication
- Born: April 8, 1872; Glasgow, Missouri
- Died: 1938 (aged 65–66)
- Occupations: Playwright, educator

Ruth Ada Gaines-Shelton (April 8, 1872 – 1938) was an American playwright and educator. She is a playwright of the Harlem Renaissance era and is best known for her allegorical comedy,The Church Fight, written in 1925.

== Biography ==
Gaines-Shelton was born on April 8, 1872, in Glasgow, Missouri. Her father was Reverend George W. Gaines, a minister in the African Methodist Episcopal Church and her mother was Mary Elizabeth Gaines. Gaines-Shelton was raised by her father following her mother’s early death when Gaines-Shelton was only a little girl. Throughout her life, Gaines-Shelton assisted her father with church work as he directed the building of the Old Bethel AME Church on Dearborn Street in Chicago. Gaines-Shelton attended Wilberforce University in Ohio and graduated in 1895. She taught in public schools in Montgomery, Missouri from 1894 to 1899. In 1898, Gaines-Shelton married William Osbern Shelton and together they had three children. Gaines-Shelton is most well known for her play The Church Fight (1925) and the play is notable for being one of the first comedies written by an African-American. Gaines-Shelton died in Montgomery, Missouri, in 1938.

== Works ==
Ruth Gaines-Shelton plays were part of the Harlem Renaissance. She began writing plays in 1906 many of which were written for her own church, for children, and for women's clubs. Not all of her plays have survived with many of her manuscripts lost and unpublished. Some of the many other plays she has written include Aunt Hagar's Children, The Church Mouse, Gena, the Lost Child, Lord Earlington's Broken Vow, Mr. Church, and Parson's Dewdrop Bride. Gaines-Shelton’s work, like many other Black artists of her time, is highly important because it documents the experiences of Black Americans during a time when opportunities for this expression were closed off to them.

In 1925, when Gaines-Shelton was just a grandmother she submitted her play, The Church Fight, to a playwrighting contest sponsored by The Crisis. Her work earned her a second-place prize of $40 as well as additional recognition for Gaines-Shelton's work. Her play was subsequently published in The Crisis in May 1926. Additionally, her play was performed by The Krigwa Players in the basement of Harlem’s 135th Street Library. The play was performed alongside another winner of the crisis magazine, The Broken Banjo. The two plays together earned $240 in ticket sales. It is averaged that 200 patrons would come and watch The Church Fight along with other plays of that time. The Church Fight marked a milestone in the Harlem community by being a part of the first series of plays written by Black Americans and for Black Americans.

=== The Church Fight ===
The Church Fight is a comedy that uses a church as the main focal point of the story and explores the many different people one may encounter at church. Gaines-Shelton uses this setting to “poke fun at the follies of the church as the parishioners set out to get rid of the minister [Parson Procrastinator] but end up giving him a solid vote of confidence”. The Church Fight has three distinctive aspects. The first notable aspect is that the play is a comedy which sets it apart from many other play written by Black Americans at the time. Comedies were not commonly done during the Harlem Renaissance era because of ongoing racial struggles, World War I, and the economic challenges as the depression approached. The second unique aspect of The Church Fight is that it is a religious allegory. The characters in the play symbolize abstract categories: Investigator, Judas, Instigator, Experience, Take-It-Back, and Two-Face. The play often reveals the “fickleness and pettiness of some elders of the church." The final unique aspect is that it does not deal with the relationship between different racial communities. It is wholly centered around the Black experience, and written for a Black audience. Despite The Church Fight being a one-act short play, it is full of humor and the audience deeply resonated with the play’s themes. Gaines-Shelton uses the most valued and highly regarded place to the Black community, the church, and satirizes the most common activity among church members, gossip, to create an experience that Black audience members described as watching a “slice of life”. The Church Fight, being one of the very few comedies and plays with a church as its focal point, was well loved by many that it was even a possible inspiration for Eulalie Spence’s A Fool’s Errand.

=== Characters ===
The Brethren

- Ananias: the husband to Sapphira. Ananias has only one scene in which he declare to his wife his opposition to having Parson Procrastinator at the church.
- Investigator: logical and levelheaded.
- Judas: comedic and mischievous. Judas encourages Take-it-Back behavior, and encourages the sisters to have the same fighting spirit.
- Parson Procrastinator: notoriously bad with money relating to church affairs. The center of the conflict and an intimidating figure.

The Sisters

- Sapphira: the wife to Ananias. Sapphira is first introduced with her husband at the start of the play. Her role in the play is to represent those that do not fit into an archetype like "Meddler" and "Instigator".
- Instigator: a jokester and an instigator as her namesake suggests. Like Take-it-Back, Instigator is known to be quite troublesome in her own regard. Instigator adds fuel to fire when everyone is discussing whether Parson Procrastinator should leave.
- Meddler: as her namesake suggests, Meddler is known to find any opportunity to meddle in other's personal affairs. For example, bringing up the fact that Parson Procastinator bought an expensive home and questioning where he could have possibly acquired the money from.
- Experience: the most mature and responsible among the sisters. Experience wants to avoid fighting because she has already had experience being in one against a Parson Hard-head.
- Take-it-Back: known to start gossip and not back down from a fight. Take-it-Back is the most adamant on finding any claim to get Parson Procrastinator out of the church.
- Two-Face: oblivious and indifferent to the church fight. The shyest of the sisters. Two-Face does not have much dialogue, however, Two-Face is noted for being the only woman of the sisters to wear a street dress instead of a house dress like the rest of the sisters.
