= List of figures from the Harlem Renaissance =

The Harlem Renaissance, also known as the New Negro Movement, was a cultural, social, and artistic explosion centered in Harlem, New York, and spanning the 1920s. This list includes intellectuals and activists, writers, artists, and performers who were closely associated with the movement.

== Intellectuals, activists, journalists ==
- Alain Locke
- Ferdinand Q. Morton
- Mary White Ovington
- Chandler Owen
- A. Philip Randolph

== Writers ==
- Lewis Grandison Alexander
- Sterling A. Brown
- Joseph Seamon Cotter, Jr.
- Countee Cullen
- Alice Dunbar-Nelson
- Jessie Redmon Fauset
- Rudolph Fisher
- Edythe Mae Gordon
- Eugene Gordon (writer)
- Angelina Weld Grimke
- Robert Hayden
- Gladys May Casely Hayford
- Ariel Williams Holloway
- Langston Hughes
- Zora Neale Hurston
- Georgia Douglas Johnson
- Helene Johnson
- James Weldon Johnson
- Nella Larsen
- Claude McKay
- May Miller
- Effie Lee Newsome
- Richard Bruce Nugent
- Esther Popel
- George Schuyler
- Eulalie Spence
- Anne Spencer
- Wallace Thurman
- Jean Toomer
- Carl Van Vechten
- Eric Walrond

== Performers and entertainers ==
- Josephine Baker
- Anise Boyer
- Charles Sidney Gilpin
- Adelaide Hall
- Nina Mae McKinney
- Mantan Moreland
- Krigwa Players
- Bill 'Bojangles' Robinson
- Nicholas Brothers
- Paul Robeson
- Tip, Tap and Toe
- The Four Step Brothers

== Musicians and composers ==
- Marian Anderson
- Louis Armstrong
- Count Basie
- Gladys Bentley
- Eubie Blake
- Cab Calloway
- The Chocolate Dandies
- Dorothy Dandridge
- Duke Ellington
- Adelaide Hall
- Roland Hayes
- Fletcher Henderson
- Billie Holiday
- Lena Horne
- Hall Johnson
- James Price Johnson
- Moms Mabley
- Pigmeat Markham
- Florence Mills
- Jelly Roll Morton
- Ma Rainey
- Noble Sissle
- Bessie Smith
- Victoria Spivey
- William Grant Still
- Fats Waller
- Ethel Waters
- Chick Webb
- Bert Williams
- Fess Williams

== Visual artists ==
- Charles Alston
- Henry Bannarn
- Richmond Barthé
- Romare Bearden
- Leslie Bolling, wood carvings
- Miguel Covarrubias, caricaturist
- Beauford Delaney
- Aaron Douglas
- Edwin A. Harleston
- Palmer Hayden
- Sargent Johnson
- William H. Johnson (painter)
- Lois Mailou Jones
- Jacob Lawrence
- Norman Lewis (artist)
- Archibald Motley
- Augusta Savage
- James Van Der Zee
- Meta Warrick Fuller
- Laura Wheeler Waring
- Hale Woodruff
