= Ethiopian Art Theatre =

The Ethiopian Art Theatre — originally called the Chicago Folk Theatre, later the Colored Folk Theatre, also referred to as the Ethiopian Art Players — was an African American theatre company based out of Chicago, Illinois. The company was an influential albeit short-lived (1922/1923–1925) group founded during the Harlem Renaissance. There are differing views over the precise year that the company was founded, 1922 or 1923. The founder was Raymond O'Neil, a white theatre director, and its principal sponsor was Mrs. Sherwood Anderson, also white; though all its performers were African American. The organization was unique and controversial during its era, primarily for being one of the few African American Theatre Companies to perform European theatrical works, but also, among other things, for producing theatrical works of African American playwrights for both African American and Non-African American audiences.

== Aim of the Ethiopian Art Theater ==
According to The Crisis magazine in 1923, the aims of the Ethiopian Art Theater were to create "dramatic pieces" that have "universal appeal" for both African Americans as for other races including Caucasians and Asians. Secondly, the organization sought to encourage African Americans and Whites in the construction of dramatic literature and theater. Last, the Ethiopian Art Theater sought to extend this experience to other organizations and cities where there was a large African American community in the hopes of establishing similar theaters.

As a response to numerous social, legal, and artistic restrictions on African Americans in the early 20th century, the Ethiopian Art Theater became a significant means of African American self-actualization. Raymond O'Neil's talents and use of African American culture became one of the greatest successes in the African American cultural production. It was one of the first African American dramatic theater companies to make its way to the Broadway stage. Some even say it paved the way for other great African Americans to showcase their talents. In addition, the theater found a way to create a middle ground between white and black cultural drama. For approximately three years after its opening, Fredi Washington became the first Negro actress to play a mulatto in the play The Great White Way. Such roles were normally played by white actors but Washington fought to play this role. In addition, O'Neil revised Salome for one week in May 1923 to include African American features, and created a jazzy version of Shakespeare's Comedy of Errors. He also recreated the Medieval drama, Everyman, to include a cabaret scene. Supporters of the theater group saw the organization as a way to promote cultural and economic development in the community.

The theater hit some financial struggles due to the lack of donors in the Ethiopian Art Theater organization. Still, W.E.B. Du Bois made a statement proclaiming it a success by saying how "Financially the experiment was a failure; but dramatically and spiritually it was one of the greatest successes that this country has seen."

== The Chip Woman's Fortune (play) ==
Along with the Ethiopian Art Theatre's European theatrical repertoire the group was also committed to performing works by African American playwrights. The company, "requested help from The Crisis, the official publication for the National Association for the advancement of Colored People (N.A.A.C.P). W.E.B. Du Bois, its editor, recommended Willis Richardson, who had won two of its annual literary contests, and the company chose Richardson's one-act play The Chip Woman's Fortune. " ... The Chip Woman's Fortune opened on [sic] 7 May 1923 at the Frazee Theatre, making it the first black drama produced on the Great White Way." The play centered around a critical incident in the life of a poor African American family. It was not a financial success but W. E. B. Du Bois lauded it:

The Negro Drama in America took another step forward when the Ethiopian Art Players under Raymond O'Neil, came to Broadway, New York. Financially the experiment was a failure; but dramatically and spiritually it was one of the greatest successes this country as ever seen.

— W. E. B. Du Bois
The Crisis, July 1923

=== Controversy ===
In its brief existence, the Ethiopian Art Theatre managed to stir-up considerable controversy — to a level that, in some instances, challenged its otherwise well-established credibility. The biggest controversy came from external conflicts " ... when the show opened in New York on 7 May 1923, it faced enforced segregated seating at Broadway's Frazee Theatre. The African American Press and many in the audience were given seats in the balcony, but they, "flatly refused to occupy them." Eventually the management withdrew segregated seating and the performance continued for two weeks before returning to Harlem." David Krasner writes, "[m]any attendees of the opening night's performance had to be forcibly removed from the theatre, while others interrupted with "laughter and loud talk" during "the climax of the play."

Another point of tension between the company, the New York City Critics, and the greater New York theatre establishment was that the Ethiopian Theatre Company chose to perform works such as Oscar Wilde's Salome and Shakespeare's Comedy of Errors, that, at the time, were not thought to be plays for African American performers and that cut in on the financial gains of other theatre companies who felt that ethically they had exclusive rights to European works. Instead of playing exclusively for audiences in Harlem, the Ethiopian Art Theatre chose ambitiously to work within the mainstream New York, Washington, D.C., and Chicago theatre systems that, due to both social and financial segregation, primarily catered to white audiences.

O'Neil also caused internal and external strife when he couldn't decide which pieces from the company's repertoire to perform. "O'Neil eager to capitalize on the "novelty" of African American actors in "mainstream" plays, frequently switched shows at the last minute. Audiences, purchasing tickets with the guarantee for a particular show, were infuriated at discovering that the bill had been switched at curtain time and another show was being offered. This not only angered the audience, it upset the actors, who only at the last minute learned what show they would perform. As a consequence the acting suffered and the Broadway productions received mixed reviews."

=== The Curtain Closes ===
"With only modest success, they [the Ethiopian Art Theatre] opened on Broadway for only two weeks and then returned to Lafayette before closing their New York engagement and disbanding entirely." The company gave rise to several noteworthy careers such as: Evelyn Preer (1896–1932) who was considered a "pioneer in the cinema world for colored women", Sidney Kirkpatrick, Marion Taylor, Laura Bowman, Solomon Bruce, and Aurthur Ray. Many of these performers were previously involved with the Lafayette Players, and went on to other notable projects.

Richardson's characters in The Chip Woman's Fortune are not stereotyped: They have dignity, pride, and a love of God, family, and neighbors. Nor did other works produced by the Ethiopian Art Players stereotype African Americans as drunks, prostitutes, criminals, or clowns who grin and sham their way through life. Thus The Ethiopian Art Players not only performed classical European works and opened the door of mainstream professional theatre to African American performers, but the company also opened doors for realistic plays about African American life.

— Marvie Brooks
John Jay College of Criminal Justice (2004)

== Productions ==
- Everyman

Medieval drama
By Hugo von Hofmannsthal

- The Follies of Scapin

By Molière

- George

An expressionistic play from the German of Büchner
By D.B. Bowerfind (Note: D.B. Bowerfind is likely Dorothy H. Bowerfind (1900–1997), one of two wives of Raymond O'Neil)

- Salome

By Oscar Wilde
May 1923, Dunbar Theatre, Philadelphia
Daily performances preceded The Chip Woman's Fortune

- The Taming of the Shrew

By Shakespeare

- The Comedy of Errors

jazz style (jazz band accompaniment)
By Shakespeare
March 15, 1923, Frazee Theatre

- The Chip Woman's Fortune

By Willis Richardson
May 1923, Dunbar Theatre, Philadelphia
Daily performances preceded Salome

- The Gold Front Stores, Inc.

Comedy, 3 acts (1924)
By Caesar G. Washington
Opened March 23, 1924, Lafayette Theatre, Harlem
Starring Abbie Mitchell, Edna Thomas, Gus Smith
Directed by Raymond O'Neil

- Cooped Up

Drama, 1 act (1924)
By Eloise Bibb Thompson (née Eloise Bibb; 1878–1928)
1925
(also produced October 15, 1924, by the National Ethiopian Art Theatre, Inc.)

== Selected actors ==
- Lewis Alexander
- Coy Applewhite
- Laura Bowman
- Solomon Bruce
- George Jackson
- Sidney Kirkpatrick
- Lionel Monagas
- Charles Olden
- Evelyn Preer (1896–1932), a pioneer in the cinema world for African American women
- Arthur Ray
- Marion Taylor
- Arthur Thompson
- Walter White
- Zaidee Jackson
