= The Pot Maker =

Play by Marita Bonner

- Written by: Marita Bonner
- Characters: Elias Jackson; Lucinda Jackson; Nettie Jackson; Luke Jackson; Lew Fox

The Pot Maker or The Pot Maker: a Play to be Read is a short one act play by Marita Bonner. The play was written in 1927 and was the first Bonner wrote, the others being The Purple Flower and Exit, an Illusion: A One-Act Play. It was published in the February 1927 issue of Opportunity: A Journal of Negro Life.

== Character list ==
- The Son - "Called of God" Elias Jackson
- His Wife - Lucinda Jackson
- His Mother - Nettie Jackson
- His Father - Luke Jackson
- Lucinda's lover - Lew Fox

== Plot summary ==
The play opens with Elias trying to get his family to sit in a row so he can give a sermon. Both Mother and Lucinda, Elias' wife are not amused with the situation and try to give feedback as to what is being said. Elias' father is sympathetic and tries to calm the women. Elias then goes on to tell his tale about the pots. Elias tells a story of a man who lived in a house full of pots. Rooms and rooms of pots. One day the man was talking to the pots, telling them that they all have a handle and bottoms and that if they do as Elias says they can turn into any type of pot that they want, "Tin pots, iron pots, brass pots, silver pots. Even gold." The pots then respond asking what they have to do. The man tells them to sit right where they are and to not spill any of the liquid that he put inside of them. One of the pots tells the man that it has a crack in it so the man fixes the crack with some dirt and spit. One of the pots gets scared, rolls over and spills its contents. Slowly the pots started to hear noises and more and more tipped over and spilled. The next morning the man comes into the room. The most cheery of the pots turned to gold, the pots that acknowledged the man but hung their heads turned to silver, and the pots that tried to stand back up after toppling over turned to brass. The rest that were still on their sides turned to tin. Elias then goes on to end his sermon by saying that the pots are people. Those who keep the ways of the Lord will be gold, while those who dismiss Him will be as worthless as a tin can.

After finishing the rest of his sermon Father congratulates Elias on a job well done, while Mother and Lucinda are skeptical about the subject matter of the story. Lucinda, sick of being in the house, decides she will put on her red-beaded necklace and go out. Mother tries to go with her. Elias tries to stop Lucinda from leaving but Lucinda lashes out, telling Elias if he were a real man he would keep a job and that God would never pick a fool to be a preacher.

Suddenly outside the dark window a noise can be heard coming from the bushes outside. There is a splash and it is believed that someone fell into the well outside the house. Lucinda tries to go outside to check but Elias holds her back saying there is no point. Then Elias accuses Lucinda of trying to go see Lew, her lover. He encourages her to go. She suddenly realizes it was Lew who fell down the well. She runs outside calling Lew's name. All of a sudden there is a crack and a splash and Lucinda is gone. Elias shouts outside "You all is tin!" Having a change of heart he rushes outside. We hear the cracking of wood and a splat. The play ends with the sound of wind rushing through the door.

== Themes ==
The main theme of this plot is that the guilty always meet their fate. It is quite obvious that each person in the family is represented by a pot in Elias' story. Lucinda being a tin pot who does not follow God at all, Mother being a brass pot who is skeptical but still loves her son, Father who is silver who supports his son but is not as vocal, and finally Elias, the golden child, who trusts in God until the very end when he tries to save the others.

== Rule of three ==
This story heavily uses the rule of three, which establishes the smallest pattern a person is able to recognize. The rule of three is used heavily in bible verses, songs, stories, speeches and quotes. Because of the small number it makes people remember the information for a longer period of time and helps the message stick. The Rule of Three is used effectively in the Pot Maker, Elias representing the gold pot, his Mother and Father the Silver pots and Lucinda being the Brass pot. Bonner also uses the Rule of Three at the end of the story with the crashing of trees and the loss of three of the stories characters.

== Production history ==
This is a play that is meant to be read. Because of this people have honored Marita Bonner's wishes and have not produced a published production of this play.

=== Harlem Renaissance ===
The Harlem Renaissance was an explosion of culture and social issues that occurred in Harlem, New York during the 1920s and is considered the "rebirth of African American Arts."
