= Cleveland Play House =

Regional theater company in Ohio, US

- Formation: 1915
- Type: Theatre group
- Location(s): 1407 Euclid Avenue; Cleveland, Ohio 44115
- Artistic director: Michael Barakiva
- Website: www.clevelandplayhouse.com

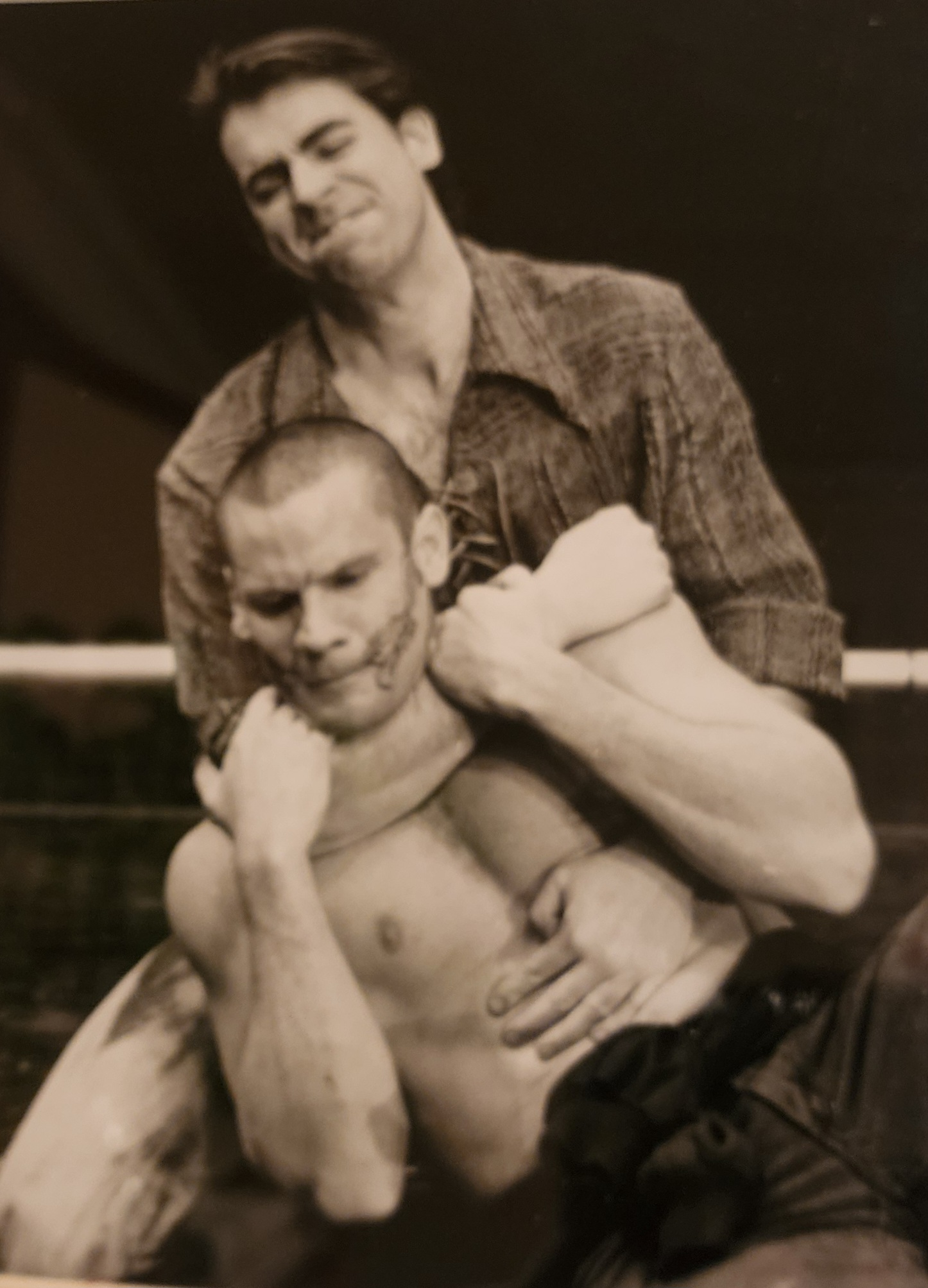
James Riordan (above) and Ted Marcoux in "Bovver Boys"

Cleveland Play House (CPH) is a professional regional theater company located in Cleveland, Ohio. It was founded in 1915 and built its own noted theater complex in 1927. Currently the company performs at the Allen Theatre in Playhouse Square where it has been based since 2011.

Cleveland Play House is organized like most American theater companies, with a board of directors and a number of administrators. The board of directors is chaired by Jonathon Bloomberg. The artistic director is Michael Barakiva. The managing director is Rachel Fink. The theater's honorary national directors are Alan Alda, Austin Pendleton, and Joel Grey.

The theatre received the 2015 Regional Theatre Tony Award on June 7, 2015, at Radio City Music Hall in New York City.

== History ==
=== Origins ===
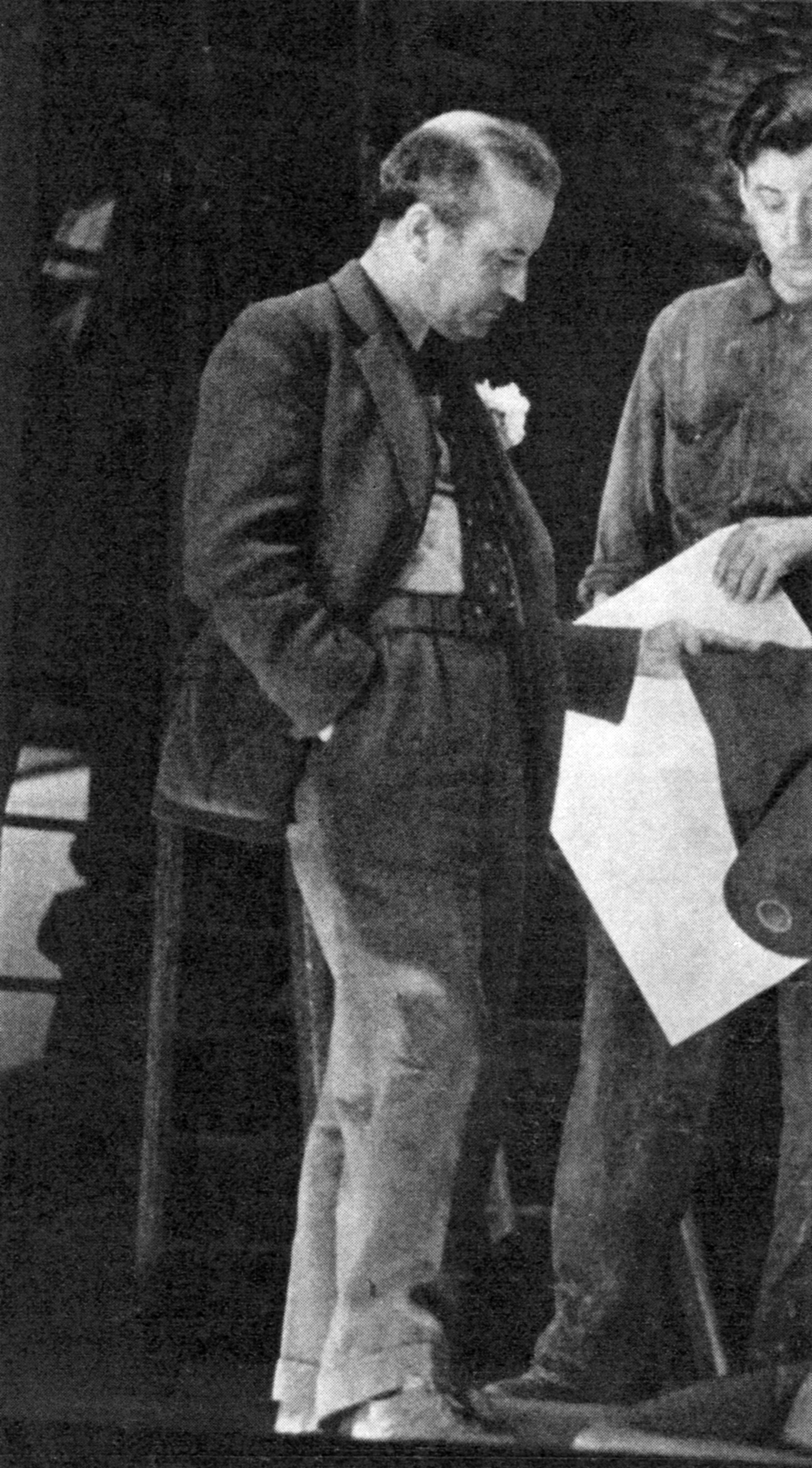
Frederic McConnell, director of the Cleveland Play House (1938)

In the early 1900s Cleveland theatre featured mostly vaudeville, melodrama, burlesque and light entertainment. In 1915 a select group of ten Clevelanders met in the home of Charles S. and Minerva Brooks to discuss the formation of an Art Theatre. Those present in addition to the Brooks were Walter and Julia McCune Flory, Raymond O'Neil, Ernest and Katharine Angell, Henry and Anna Hohnhorst, George Clisbee, Grace Treat, and Marthena Barrie. Together, they formed Cleveland Play House and named O'Neil as the Director. Their initial productions were performed in a home donated by Cleveland industrialist Francis Drury located at East 85th and Euclid Avenue. O'Neil was a devotee of the artistic ideals of Edward Gordon Craig, and the Play House's earliest productions reflect this. The founders of the Play House were bohemians and suffragists, and were thus outsiders in conservative Cleveland society. As a result, the Play House in its early years performed for a select group of individuals interested in avant-garde art, rather than the larger community of Cleveland.

The Play House was founded midway through a decade of cultural renaissance in Cleveland. Through a partnership of idealistic vision and philanthropic largess, many of Cleveland's major cultural organizations were formed between 1910 and 1920—Cleveland Music School Settlement, Karamu House, the Cleveland Museum of Art, the Cleveland Orchestra, the Cleveland Institute of Music and the Cleveland Museum of Natural History.

After moving through several facilities in its first two years, the Play House purchased and renovated a church at Cedar Avenue and East 73rd Street, and opened the Cedar Avenue Theatre in December 1917. The new facility seated 160 and marked a turn toward professionalism. Soon after this, the Play House began to struggle financially, and the Board of Directors became increasingly dissatisfied with Raymond O'Neil's leadership. The resulting arguments led to O'Neil's resignation in 1921. The board subsequently hired Frederic McConnell as the next Director, along with his associates K. Elmo Lowe and Max Eisenstat as assistants. The three transformed CPH into a popular regional theatre, ushering in a long era of growth and prosperity.

A new Cleveland Play House facility, built in 1927, housed the Brooks Theatre and the Drury Theatre. To accommodate its growth, CPH in 1949 opened the 77th Street Theatre in a converted church, which featured America's first open stage – the forerunner of the thrust stage that was popularized in the 1950s and 1960s. In the 1980s, the 77th Street Theatre was closed, Cleveland Play House purchased the Sears building and the world-renowned architect Philip Johnson designed significant additions for the complex, including the Bolton Theatre. With the 1927 buildings, the Sears building and the Johnson buildings taken together, the complex for CPH became the largest regional theatre complex in the country.

=== Recent history ===
In 2009, through a collaboration called "The Power of Three," CPH partnered with Playhouse Square and Cleveland State University to create the new Allen Theatre Complex in downtown Cleveland. In July 2009, CPH sold its building at 86th Street and Euclid Avenue to Cleveland Clinic. In September 2011, CPH kicked off its 96th consecutive season in the transformed Allen Theatre at Playhouse Square. Two new venues adjacent to the Allen Theatre came on board in January 2012, the Second Stage (renamed the Outcalt Theatre in 2014) and the Helen Rosenfeld Lewis Bialosky Lab Theatre. A new production center is now located along the lakeshore in Cleveland, and administrative offices and education center are on East 13th Street.

The list of plays and playwrights that have had premiers at Cleveland Play House is impressive, the most notable being Tennessee Williams' You Touched Me, and Bertolt Brecht's Mother Courage. Other notable premiers include The Pleasure of Honesty by Luigi Pirandello, Simone by Ben Hecht, Translations by Brian Friel, A Decent Birth by William Saroyan, Command by William Wister Haines, Ten Times Table by Alan Ayckbourn, The March on Russia by David Storey, The Archbishop's Ceiling by Arthur Miller, First Monday in October by Jerome Lawrence and Robert E. Lee, Lillian by William Luce, The Cemetery Club by Ivan Menchell, The Effect of Gamma Rays on Man-in-the-Moon Marigolds by Paul Zindel, Jerusalem by Seth Greenland, The Smell of the Kill by Michele Lowe, and Bright Ideas by Eric Coble. Cleveland Play House continues to have a strong commitment to new works, especially those written by Ohio playwrights.

At least one mainstage production in each season is a new play.

== Master of Fine Arts Program ==
Founded in 1996, the MFA program at Cleveland Play House is affiliated with Case Western Reserve University. The master's degree for actors is a three-year program with a new class beginning study every other year. Tuition is waived, and an annual living stipend is awarded to each student automatically. The most notable graduate to date is Rich Sommer (class of 2004), who is featured on the AMC series Mad Men and had a recurring role on NBC's The Office. Elizabeth A. Davis (class of 2006), was nominated for a Tony for her performance in Once. During the students' third year in the program, they are engaged on an Actors' Equity contract in a Cleveland Play House main stage production. Students conclude their studies by performing in an agent showcase in New York. During their term of study, the students are also cast in readings and other smaller productions. Each year of study focuses on a different area and period of theatre, as well as a cumulative study of voice, movement, and technique. Cleveland Play House teaches pre-K to MFA so children can start learning and developing skills when they are young.

== New Ground Theatre Festival ==
New Ground Theatre Festival (formerly known as FusionFest) is an annual showcase of new theatrical works. Cleveland Play House develops and presents a variety of new work from nationally recognized artists, and each year produces a centerpiece production.

Cleveland Play House has showcased many playwrights and their emerging work at New Ground Theatre Festival, including Jordan Harrison (Marjorie Prime, 2013), George Brant (Grounded, 2014), Elizabeth A. Davis (Joe, 2014), Kirsten Greenidge (Little Roe Boat or, Conjecture, 2016), and Eric Coble(Fairfield, 2014, Feed 2016, These Mortal Hosts, 2017).

== Notable artists ==
Alan Alda, Joel Grey, Margaret Hamilton, Paul Newman, Elizabeth Hartman, Eleanor Parker, June Squibb, Ray Walston, Jack Weston, Grant Show and James Riordan are among the many actors whose careers began at the Play House which also operates the nation's oldest community-based-theatre-education programs.

== Artistic directors ==
1915–1921	Raymond O'Neil
1921–1958	Frederic McConnell
1959–1970	K. Elmo Lowe
1970–1971	William Green
1971–1985	Richard Oberlin
1988–1994	Josephine Abady
1995–2004	Peter Hackett
2004–2013	Michael Bloom
2013–2022	Laura Kepley
2023–present	Michael Barakiva

== Recent productions ==
=== 2019–2020 season ===
Show	Date	Location
Into the Breeches!	September 14 - October 6	Allen Theatre
Pipeline	October 12 - November 3	Outcalt Theatre
The Merchant of Venice	November 6 - November 16	Helen Theatre
Every Brilliant Thing	November 23 - December 22	Helen Theatre
A Christmas Story	November 29 - December 23	Allen Theatre
Clue	January 25 - February 23	Allen Theatre
Getting Near to Baby	February 7–15	Helen Theatre

=== 2018–2019 season ===
Show	Date	Location
The Woman in Black	September 15 - October 7	Allen Theatre
Sweat	October 13 - November 4	Outcalt Theatre
A Christmas Story	November 23 - December 23	Allen Theatre
An Iliad	January 12 - February 10	Outcalt Theatre
Ken Ludwig's Sherwood: The Adventures of Robin Hood	February 2–24	Allen Theatre
Tiny Houses	March 23 - April 14	Outcalt Theatre
Native Gardens	April 27 - May 19	Allen Theatre

=== 2017–2018 season ===
Show	Date	Location
Shakespeare in Love	September 9 - October 1	Allen Theatre
The Diary of Anne Frank	October 21 - November 19	Outcalt Theatre
A Christmas Story	November 24 - December 23	Allen Theatre
Marie and Rosetta	January 20 - February 11	Allen Theatre
The Invisible Hand	February 17 - March 11	Outcalt Theatre
The 25th Annual Putnam County Spelling Bee	April 14 - May 6	Allen Theatre
The Royale	May 5–27	Outcalt Theatre

=== 2016–2017 season ===
Show	Date	Location
All the Way	September 17 - October 9	Allen Theatre
Sex With Strangers	October 22 - November 13	Outcalt Theatre
A Christmas Story	November 25 - December 23	Allen Theatre
Ken Ludwig's Baskerville: A Sherlock Holmes Mystery	January 21 - February 12	Allen Theatre
How I Learned to Drive	March 4 - March 26	Allen Theatre
Between Riverside and Crazy	April 1–23	Outcalt Theatre

=== 2015–2016 (100th anniversary) season ===
Show	Date	Location
Ken Ludwig's A Comedy of Tenors	September 5 - October 3	Allen Theatre
The Crucible	October 10 - November 8	Outcalt Theatre
A Christmas Story	November 27 - December 23	Allen Theatre
Little Shop of Horrors	January 9 - February 7	Allen Theatre
The Mountaintop	January 23 - February 14	Outcalt Theatre
Luna Gale	February 27 - March 20	Allen Theatre
Mr. Wolf	April 2–24	Outcalt Theatre
Steel Magnolias	May 21 - June 12	Allen Theatre

=== 2014–2015 season ===
Show	Date	Location
The Little Foxes	September 12 - October 5	Allen Theatre
How We Got On	October 24 - November 16	Outcalt Theatre
A Christmas Story	November 28 - December 21	Allen Theatre
Five Guys Named Moe	January 23 - February 15	Allen Theatre
The Pianist of Willesden Lane	February 27 - March 22	Allen Theatre
Vanya and Sonia and Masha and Spike	April 3–26	Allen Theatre
Fairfield	May 1 - May 31	Outcalt Theatre

== References in pop culture ==
In the movie Wet Hot American Summer, when upset about the effort of the actors in a camp play, Amy Poehler as "Susie" says: "OK, stop. I feel like I'm watching regional theatre, you guys. God! Am I in the Cleveland Play House or something? Your craft is a muscle, you need to exercise it. Take a break; think about what you've done."

Filmmaker David Wain explained, "The joke was that in saying how bad these campers are, she compares them to a truly respected theater company. I figured why not make a reference to my hometown?"
