= Garland Anderson =

Garland Anderson may refer to:

- Garland Anderson (composer) (1933–2001), American composer and pianist
- Garland Anderson (playwright) (1886–1938), African American playwright
