= Thelma Myrtle Duncan =

American playwright

Thelma Myrtle Duncan Brown
- Born: 1902; St. Louis, Missouri, U.S.
- Education: Howard University; Columbia University
- Occupation: playwright
- Notable work: "The Death Dance"
- Movement: Black Renaissance in DC; National Negro Theatre
- Parent(s): Samuel L. Duncan and Addie Duncan

Thelma Myrtle Duncan was an American playwright who advocated for the National Negro Theatre and who was influential during the Black Renaissance in DC.

== Biography ==
Duncan was born in St. Louis, Missouri. She was raised by Samuel L. Duncan and Addie Duncan. Duncan began studying music at Howard University on October 1, 1920. While at Howard, she studied under Thomas Montgomery Gregory, who helped her to develop her talents. As a student, Duncan wrote a play, "The Death Dance," in 1921 which was later published in Plays of Negro Life in 1927. The play was edited by Gregory and Alain Locke and was one of the earliest productions of the Howard Players, the drama troupe at Howard University. Duncan graduated from Howard with a degree in music.

After graduating from Howard, Duncan went on to be a music teacher in North Carolina, which she did not enjoy. In 1930, Duncan wrote one of her most popular plays, Sacrifice, in which she attempted to change white opinion and black morality. The play followed a character named Roy, who forfeited his good name and college scholarship to protect his friend Billy's reputation after Billy stole a chemistry exam. In 1932, Duncan moved to Albuquerque, New Mexico and worked on a novel, Ham’s Children.

In 1932, Duncan married a man with the last name Brown.

== Works ==
- "The Death Dance"
- "Sacrifice"
- "Drifter: One-Act Play of Lower Negro Life"
- "Jinda"
- "Payment"
- "The Scarlet Shawl" (c. 1920)
- "The Witch Woman"
- "Hard Times"
- "Black Magic"
