= The Chip Woman's Fortune =

The Chip Woman's Fortune is a 1923 one act play written by American playwright Willis Richardson. The play was produced by The Ethiopian Art Theatre and is historically important as the first serious work by an African American playwright to be presented on Broadway. Although Broadway had seen African American musical comedies and revues, it had never seen a serious drama.

== Characters ==
Emma: Liza's daughter, 18 and beautiful

Liza: Mother of Emma, struggling with her health

Aunt Nancy: The “chip woman” who lives with Liza's family in their home

Silas: Husband of Liza

Jim: Son of Aunt Nancy

== Synopsis ==
The play opens with Liza not feeling well and being taken care of by Aunt Nancy. Emma enters and is chastised by Liza for wearing makeup. Both Emma and Liza agree that Aunt Nancy has been a very helpful presence in the home, especially for Liza’s health. Liza explains to Emma that the Victrola has left the family in debt, and that Silas has been furloughed for a couple of days. With the family already being extremely poor, and men coming to gather the debt any minute, Liza suspects that Silas will need to put Aunt Nancy out of the house, because she does not pay rent. Silas enters the home and explains how he suspects Aunt Nancy secretly has a fortune that she keeps buried in the backyard. He wants to either ask her for the money or kick her out. Aunt Nancy re-enters and confesses that she is keeping money in the backyard to save for her son, who got out of jail that day and will be appearing at the house any minute. Jim enters and gives Silas fifteen dollars. He then proceeds to give half the money Aunt Nancy has saved for him to Silas. Silas repays his debts, and Aunt Nancy and Jim exit.

== Reviews ==
The Chip Woman's Fortune is noted for its simplicity. None of the characters are over glorified or overdone. Bernard Peterson quotes from the New York Times review, "The Chip Woman’s Fortune…is an unaffected and wholly convincing transcript of everyday character. No one is tricked out of pleasure; no one is blackened to serve as a 'dramatic' contrast. I am referring, of course, to points of essential character, not to that matter of walnut stain." W. E. B. Du Bois wrote in The Crisis, "The Negro Drama in America took another step forward when The Ethiopian Art Players under Raymond O'Neil, came to Broadway, New York. Financially the experiment was a failure; but dramatically and spiritually it was one of the greatest successes this country as ever seen."

== Willis Richardson's Legacy ==
Noted as one of the most important playwrights for the African American community. In a review of the biography Willis Richardson, Forgotten Pioneer of African-American Drama (1999), by Christine Raucous Gray, N. Graham Nesmith writes:

In this essay, "The Hope of A Negro Drama”, Richardson stresses "that the plays written by African Americans should focus on the black community and not on racial tension and differences". He goes on to state that most of his plays would be "drawn for the most part from folk tradition, they should center on black conflicts within the black community."

On December 13, 1922, Richardson sent a letter to Thomas Montgomery Gregory, stating "Negro drama has been, next to my wife and children”, the very hope of my life. I shall do all within my power to advance it.” During these formative years of black drama, Richardson exerted his energies towards promoting and perfecting his craft. He was posthumously honored as "Outstanding Pioneer" in black Theatre by AUDELCO, Audience Development Committee, which promotes black theatre in New York City.
