= Garland Anderson (playwright) =

American dramatist

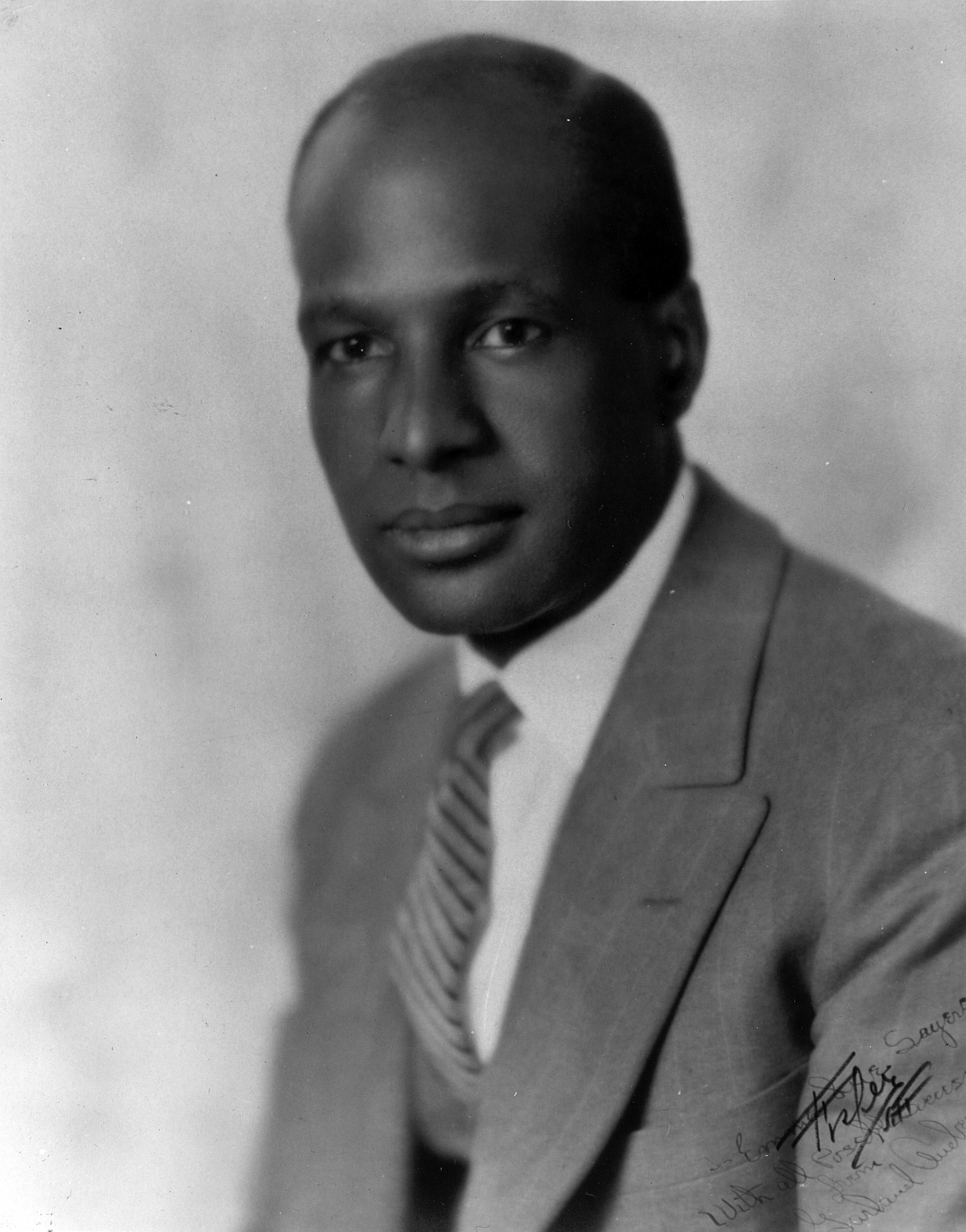
- Anderson in 1928
- Born: February 18, 1886; Wichita, Kansas, United States
- Died: June 1, 1939 (aged 53); New York City, New York, United States
- Occupations: Playwright; speaker
- Known for: First African American playwright to have a full-length drama on Broadway
- Notable work: Appearances (1925)
- Spouse: Doris Sequirra

Garland Anderson (February 18, 1886 – June 1, 1939) was an American playwright and speaker, known for his contributions to African-American literature. After having a full-length drama on Broadway, Anderson gave talks on empowerment and success largely related to the New Thought movement. Born in Wichita, Kansas, his family moved to Sacramento, California. Anderson left home at an early age, working as a newsboy, railroad porter and hotel bellhop. In his late 30s he read a book about New Thought, saw a play by Channing Pollack and thought that his life experience and new attitude had the makings of a play. Anderson wrote the initial version of Appearances; with the assistance of Al Jolson, the play (the first three-act play by an African American) was produced on Broadway. Although it was not a success, Anderson's industry and can-do attitude were appreciated. The play was produced several times and toured the US and the UK. Anderson settled in the UK, inventing a malted-milk product and giving religious talks. He received support from Dean of Canterbury Dick Sheppard, and returned to the US for a speaking tour. During the tour, he became a New Thought minister and married Doris Sequirra. After their return to England, she wrote a book about their experiences which was published in the UK and the US. Anderson wrote other plays and books; in early 1939 he was promoting his book, Uncommon Sense, as a possible play. After having a heart attack in London, he died in New York a few days after his return. Anderson was cremated, and Doris brought his remains back to the UK.

Appearances was the first three-act play by an African American on Broadway after The Chip Woman's Fortune, a 1923 one-act play by Willis Richardson which was the first non-musical Broadway play by an African American. The substance of Appearances' moral dimensions and its history are the objects of diverse points of view.

== Background ==
According to Alan Kriezenbeck in 1994, most available primary information about Anderson is in the Billy Rose Theatre Division of the New York Public Library for the Performing Arts. Most of the material is unsourced, undated newspaper clippings from Anderson's scrapbooks. The Helen Armstead-Johnson collection at the library also has a number of clippings; Anderson was the first person of color who was a member of PEN International.

=== Kansas ===
Anderson was born on February 18, 1886, the fourth of twelve children. After about four years of schooling, he and his family moved to California. Their last known residence in Kansas may have been Topeka in 1895, and a March 1928 California State Library biography lists his parents as Louis Anderson and Naomi Bowman. Newspaper articles also indicate the early-to-mid-1890s for Anderson's arrival in California; they referred to his father's birth in slavery, and Wichita was incorporated as a city on July 21, 1870 (after the American Civil War). The only black man then in the settlement, a migrant from the east, signed the petition to form the city. It is doubtful that Anderson's parents' families were from Wichita; his parents were probably attracted to it because of economic opportunity and relatively-relaxed attitudes about race. Churches for blacks were founded in the late 1870s, and a larger black settlement began during the 1880s.

After Wichita was incorporated, it experienced an economic boom with the founding of two colleges and the passage of the Kansas Civil Rights Act of 1874. By 1890 Wichita was Kansas' third-largest city, despite anti-Chinese violence in 1886 and increased racial segregation. The city fell into recession, and many of its original settlers went bankrupt.

=== California ===
When Anderson's family arrived in Sacramento, his father was a janitor for the post office. His mother died shortly after their arrival, and Anderson soon moved to San Francisco. From the 1860s to the 1880s San Francisco began its transformation into a major city, expanding in all directions and culminating in the 1887 construction of Golden Gate Park. The city's cable-car system was developed around this time.

During the first decade of the 20th century, Anderson worked as a newsboy; decades later, his old boss remembered him working before the 1906 San Francisco earthquake and fire. He may have been a railroad porter after the fire. For about 15 years beginning around 1909, Anderson worked as a bellhop at a number of hotels. According to a 1918 draft card, Anderson was married and a hotel clerk in San Francisco. In the 1920 census Anderson, divorced, worked on Sutter Street as an operator; his father was born in Virginia and his mother in Ohio.

== Appearances ==
Anderson briefly dabbled in Christian Science. In early 1924, before he heard about Channing Pollack's The Fool, he became aware of psychology and read a book on New Thought, which impressed him. Anderson received tickets from an elderly couple, saw Pollock's play and became convinced that he could write a comparable play based on his experiences. His son was eight years old at the time, and the whereabouts of his first wife are unknown. Anderson headed the household of his brother's widow and her four children. He later said about his decision to write:

At first the idea seemed absurd ... No one realized more than myself that though I wanted to write this play, I had no training in the technique of dramatic construction; but I also realized that to shirk what I wanted to do could be likened to the outer shell of the acorn after it was planted in the ground saying to the inner stir of life for expression, "What are you stirring for? Surely you don't expect to become a great oak tree?" With this firm conviction I determined to write a play."

He wrote about the process of writing:

Whenever the switchboard would ring while I was writing I would say to myself, "This is just a loving call coming just at the right time to refresh my thoughts in order that I might be able to write better"; and when someone would speak to me I would mentally say, "This is a loving interruption coming at just the right time to prevent me from writing the wrong thing.

Anderson wrote Don't Judge By Appearances in three weeks. According to his typist, she became engrossed by it and it helped her solve a personal problem. He showed the play to San Francisco Chronicle critic George Warren; Warren thought the idea very good, but its writing needed work. Anderson received support from friends and co-workers at his hotel because of his optimism and enthusiasm. He was connected with Al Jolson, who supported the play's early development and his move to New York City in 1924. Anderson, living at the Braeburn Apartments on Sutter Street and noted as vice-president of San Francisco's NAACP chapter, appeared in New York with his attorney in November. By Christmas, Anderson reported a leave of absence from the Braeburn Apartments Hotel (where he was a switchboard operator) and support from Al Jolson, Marjorie Rambeau, Channing Pollock and Richard Bennett. He stayed at the Harlem YMCA.

=== New York ===
In January 1925, it was reported that Jolson had financed Anderson's move to New York. Anderson made the rounds of newspapers, who took him at his word. By April, however, the play had funding difficulties. Early in the month, Anderson presented a reading to an audience of 600 at the Waldorf-Astoria to drum up support. Although audience members were reportedly moved to tears, the reading earned only $140. Newspapers continued to cover the play's development, and a free reading at the Manhattan Opera House was scheduled for April 26. When funding still lagged, Anderson went to see President Calvin Coolidge and New York Governor Al Smith; in June, another writer was brought in and the play was renamed Appearances. Theater manager Lester W. Sagar offered to produce it, receiving an option to purchase half the rights for $15,000 while Anderson retained the West Coast production rights. Two Braeburn Apartments residents reportedly became major investors. Anderson returned to his job in San Francisco, selling half the West Coast production rights for another $15,000 after two public readings (the second broadcast on KFCR). His sendoff from the mayor of San Francisco was well-publicized; he hurried back to New York in a touring car driven by a friend (another car held his supporters) in early September and appeared on WHN several weeks later, receiving a positive review. Appearances previewed in Elmira, New York, on September 26 and Utica on the 27th, opening at the Frolic Theater (atop the New Amsterdam Theatre) in New York on October 13. Lionel Monagas and Mildred Wall, who worked into the 1940s, played the leads. The play received a standing ovation on opening night but lukewarm reviews, although Anderson was praised. The New York Times called it "finely conceived, crudely wrought. ... If the language of the play is not always smooth and eloquent, if many of the characters are overdrawn, if the plot dips too often into melodrama, the play is none the less moving ... What if the lines are heavy and speechy? They are filled with the protest which roused a negro bellboy to write a play. They are lines of preaching - proud, dignified, restrained preaching which ennobles this play." The first week's gross was less than $2,000, but Anderson wrote a book describing his ideas. Although Appearances ran for only three weeks, it was the first full-length play written by a black man produced on Broadway after a 1923 one-act play by Willis Richardson. Anderson appeared on WHN near the end of October, and spoke at a Harlem school community meeting in early November.

He attempted to revive the play in late November, with attention from David Belasco and investors from Texas. The Amsterdam News published lists of contributors to the revival. Anderson was invited to address churches, and appeared on WNYC. The revival continued for a few more weeks, thanks to the unexpected contributors from Texas. Anderson supported a new church in December; two weeks later there was favorable critical publicity, and he spoke at another church. However, the revival closed in mid-January 1926. Anderson appeared on WRNY in March, and in May he was in Los Angeles exploring movie rights and future productions of Appearances.

=== West Coast ===
In June 1926, Anderson was still in Los Angeles trying to market Appearances' film rights to fund another production and spoke at an NAACP fundraiser. In April 1927 a new production, produced by Thomas Wilkes and directed by Virginia Brissac, opened at the Majestic Theatre. According to Anderson, Appearances ran for five weeks in Los Angeles. Although reviews were more positive, Anderson himself was more popular than his play.

Appearances then went on tour, reportedly opening on March 19 and running for about 12 weeks in San Francisco. Audience members played jurors for the play's trial, and response was so great that the entire audience was framed as jurors. The play closed on June 9, and was staged in Oakland, Seattle and Vancouver before heading east.

=== On the road ===
In mid-November 1928 Appearances was staged in Great Falls, Montana, several days later in Bismarck, North Dakota (receiving a positive review), followed by Minneapolis (again receiving a positive review). It reached Des Moines, Iowa in December, returning several days later to Minneapolis. In January 1929 Anderson was in Chicago, received positively but in financial difficulty which was resolved in February with nine weeks of performances. In mid-March Anderson gave a talk in New York, and Appearances returned to the city in April to negative reviews. A claim by another writer that he had written part of Appearances underwent arbitration by the Authors League of America, and Anderson received sole credit for the play. He gave talks to a local black church. In 1929, Anderson sold a work entitled Extortion to David Belasco. Appearances closed in June after 23 performances. In the summer Anderson brought producer Dorothy Tallman and leading man Dario Shindell to a gathering of Bahá'ís in New Jersey.

Anderson wrote another play, which was not produced. He successfully brought Appearances overseas in January 1930. In London, Anderson began speaking publicly about the philosophy embodied in his play. Appearances was staged in March, touring Wales, Scotland, Brussels and Paris. Anderson remained in London, presenting "tea talks" at the Mayfair Hotel. Appearances was staged in Winnipeg in April.

=== Analysis and commentary ===
Appearances was reprinted in 1996, and the play and its author have been discussed. It has been said that Appearances "does not deal with negro material", and the play is solely about the murder of a white woman. Its impact has been summarized:

Because no New York critic complained about black and white actors appearing together on stage, within four months of the opening of Anderson's most notable play, Belasco produced Lulu Belle (1926), with ninety-seven black actors and seventeen white actors. Hence the production of Appearances marked the beginning of an integrated Broadway stage.

== Speaking tours ==
=== United Kingdom ===
During the summer of 1930, Anderson debated Hannen Swaffer about the source of his inspiration at Queen's Hall in London. In December, he presented a talk entitled "Can playwrights turn failure into success?" A play, Not Quite a Lady was reportedly produced, and Anderson opened a milk bar. In 1932, he spoke to the Manchester Playgoers' Club and Appearances was performed as a Christmas benefit for the unemployed.

In 1935 Anderson gave a talk to the Practical Psychology Club, "Finding our place in life", which began a speaking tour. He published a religious book, Uncommon Sense; The Law of Life in Action, and reportedly gave talks in Germany, France and Austria. John Galsworthy invited him to speak before PEN, a London writers' association.

=== United States ===
Anderson returned to the US on May 14, 1935. He addressed audiences in New York, Boston and Philadelphia, sponsored by Dick Sheppard, William T. Manning, S. Parkes Cadman and Stephen S. Wise, and offered a series of lessons on faith and success. That year Anderson married Doris (or Dorothy) Sequirra, a British subject, in Washington.

From September 1935 through the following winter, Anderson was in California; in late January 1936, he went to Hawaii. In San Mateo, California, the "playwright, lecturer and philosopher" gave talks entitled "Finding your place in life" and "How to realize your heart's desire" to a Unity church and promoted Uncommon Sense. which was published in a few years earlier. That year in Seattle, Anderson became a New Thought minister. According to Craig Prentiss, New Thought impeded his reach to African Americans. In September and October, Anderson was again speaking in California; an Oakland series began with "Why Christianity is practical". In October, he also appeared on KLX. In November and December, Anderson was in Los Angeles with support from followers in the UK and New York; although he recognized Jesus as the founder of the most practical teaching of all time, he was independent of any religious group. In December, Anderson spoke at Beth Eden Baptist and other churches.

=== Hawaii and return to North America ===
Anderson was reported as coming to Honolulu, and he was profiled in the Honolulu Advertiser in late January as a "playwright, lecturer, philosopher, traveler and religious teacher" not dependent on religion, mysticism, or science (or any "ism") for his ideas who spoke at the Young Hotel on "How and why prayers are answered", "Finding your place in life", "Using Uncommon Sense" and "How to be prosperous". In an interview, he was described as not being "puffed up" and speaking in a "simple, conversational vein that was delightful as well as informative." Anderson addressed audiences every week, with occasional breaks: an evening audience at the Central Union Church, the Kawaihoa Church, a Chinese New Year luau, returning to the Young Hotel, a reception, a Bahá'í meeting and a youth group. Doris was mentioned (by her maiden name) in March, and left in April. Anderson visited Winnipeg in June and Buffalo, New York, in October. He made another trip to Canada in the spring of 1937, and the Andersons left for Paris in July.

== Book ==
In January 1938, Doris published a memoir entitled I Married a Negro (in the UK) and Nigger Lover in the US. Coverage of the book continued into the summer. The book was reportedly not as lurid as either title, noting that they could generally stay in the same hotel on the West Coast and in Canada but were forbidden to share a room. The Andersons ultimately returned to the UK.

== Final play ==
In 1939 Anderson had a heart attack in London, but he insisted on returning to the US in late May to stage another play based on his book Uncommon Sense. He was ill when he arrived and was interviewed in bed, with Doris answering most of the questions.

- "Garland Anderson to present Broadway Play", The New York Age, May 27, 1939, p. 4.
- Writer returns home from England, The Pittsburgh Courier, June 3, 1939, p. 5. She said that the original name of her book was its UK title, I Married a Negro. Anderson died on June 1. He was cremated, and his remains were returned to England.

== Legacy ==
Doris Anderson was again mentioned in Jet in 1953. Biographical material has been published occasionally on Anderson since the late 1960s, particularly by James Weldon Johnson. James Hatch republished Appearances, and a longer biography was written in 2012.

== Works ==
- Garland Anderson (1925). From Newsboy and Bellhop to Playwright. Cathedral Publishing Company.
- Garland Anderson (1925). The Hows and Whys of Your Success.
- Garland Anderson (1925). Appearances: A Play.
- Garland Anderson (1933). Uncommon Sense: The Law of Life in Action. L. N. Fowler & Company.
