= Exit: An Illusion =

One-act play by Marita Bonner

Exit: An Illusion is a one-act play by Marita Bonner. The play was written in 1929, but was performed for the first time in New York City by the Xoregos Performing Company in 2015. The play involves three characters (Dot, Buddy and Exit Mann), who are used as symbols to represent beliefs of the early 20th century, including colorism and sexism in America.

== Plot ==
The play begins with a foreword written by Bonner. It describes Dot and Buddy’s flat, which is a room with disheveled furniture, ragged curtains, scattered clothes, with newspapers and pillows strewn about the place. Bonner frequently mentions that the room is mixed, from the shoes to the dishes.

The play then opens with a description of Dot, who is sleeping on a couch bed, with Buddy sleeping on the floor next to it. Dot, described as a slender, pale woman who is twitching in her sleep, wakes up and tells Buddy she has to leave for her date. She shakes him awake to tell him once again. Buddy, described as a black man with "thin high-poised features", is enraged at the fact that Dot has a date. Dot insists she has known this man her entire life and mentions that his name is Exit Mann. She totters out of bed and begins to get dressed, and Bonner writes that she "is not curved, you see she is flat where she should curve, sunken where she should be flat".

At the sight of her weakened physical state, Buddy begs her to not go out. Dot is insistent, causing Buddy to change his tactics, and ask her if she’s "Fixin' to go out passing are you?", revealing the fact that even though Dot is a pale-skinned woman, she is actually half black. They begin to argue, causing Dot to call Buddy’s friends the "N-word", and Buddy to lunge towards her in anger. Although their relationship is not defined, Buddy begins to become angry at the fact that Dot has been seeing Exit Mann behind his back, and bringing him to their flat while he is not there. Blinded by anger, Buddy pulls out a pistol. Bonner's stage directions say that a man appears behind Buddy, "Half in shadow, you cannot see his face for his back is turned". The shadowy man is revealed to be Exit Mann.

The play takes a turn when the stage directions call for Dot to be drawn into Exit's arms while begging Buddy to say he loves her, and the lights go out. Buddy relights the stage with a match, and Exit Mann turns, showing a limp and silent Dot. Exit Mann's appearance is revealed by Buddy's match as the "Hollow eyes and fleshless cheeks of Death". The room suddenly reverts to how it was in the beginning of the play. Dot is back on the couch bed, with Buddy sleeping next to it. Dot struggles to wake up, and yells out Buddy's name. She calls to him, saying, "Buddy, do you love me? Say you love me 'fore I go!" Dot suddenly stretches rigid on the bed, and Buddy wakes with a start. He calls out and touches Dot, who is now presumably dead. He professes his love for her as the curtain falls.

== Characters ==
Dot – At the beginning of the play, Dot is described as a thin-faced, slender, pale woman with brown hair. She awakes easily from her sleep, and it is evident that her body is unhealthily thin. It is unclear whether Dot is in love with Buddy or Exit Mann throughout the play. When Exit makes his appearance, she begs Buddy to say he loves her, in order for her to return to him. His refusal causes her to be captured by Exit, and finally, her death. Dot's act of "passing" as a white woman shows that her racial identity causes her to have to choose a side depending on who she is with. Her eventual death represents the inability for biracial women to truly separate one identity from the other.

Buddy – Buddy is described as a "blackly black with the thin high-poised features that mark a keen black man". From the beginning of the play, he acts with a demeanor that he is responsible for Dot, even though they are described as neither brother or sister, nor man and wife. He quickly becomes angry and insulted when Dot mentions leaving him to go see another man. His choice to not confirm his love for Dot in front of Exit Mann causes him to lose her to Exit. Buddy's disapproval with Dot's independence alludes to the theme of Black men having to prove and maintain their masculinity, through owning and protecting women. His refusal to tell Dot he loves her while she is alive allows Bonner to show that men must value and appreciate the women in their life, rather than try and control them.

Exit Mann – Exit is a mysterious figure who is supposedly Dot's "date". He first appears in the show with his back turned to Dot, Buddy and the audience, but when he turns, he is described to have the "Hollow eyes and fleshless cheeks of Death". He represents an exit out of the lifestyle that Dot and Buddy live, and is romanticized in Dot's eyes in order to seem more appealing.

== Colorism and sexism in Exit ==
Dot's theatrical purpose in the show is a representation of issues of colorism and misogynoir within the Black community of that time period. Issues of Dot's race and fidelity are brought up throughout the first half, representing the fact that scrutinization of Black women, including those who are mixed, is never-ending and is brought up by those of their own race. Instead of including the usual representation of fairer skinned black women, who are seen to be more beautiful and intelligent in the eyes of white people, Bonner writes a representation that addresses the insults they must face from Black men, but also highlights the privilege their fairer skin gives them: An Exit. However, this Exit is proven to be a trap. Although it seems like passing as a white woman may be salvation from the strife of being a black woman, leaving that identity behind does not guarantee one can truly leave it behind, and that white people will be one's saving grace. Dot's manifested self-hatred is expressed through her disdain for Buddy's friends, referring to them as the n-word. Dot's ability to pass off as a white woman is based on the fact that she does resemble a woman who is white. Her inability to find a place in either world, due to judgements from both Black people (Buddy's insults) and finding false romance in retreating to the White community (Her "date" with Exit), causes her own demise.

== Harlem Renaissance Influence ==
Exit: An Illusion was written in 1929, towards the end of the Harlem Renaissance. Exit follows in the footsteps of the themes in the movement, which included challenging the pervading racism and stereotypes of the time in order to promote progressive or socialist political views, and racial and social integration. The creation of art and literature would serve to "uplift" the race, as Exit does through creating characters like Dot and Buddy, and creating Exit Mann to represent a false escape from Black strife.

Defining black identity was another main theme of the Renaissance. Buddy's complete identification as a Black man and his need to protect that identity was a common take on this theme, whereas Dot's shying away from owning her Blackness was a new and uncommon take on Black identification. Bi-racial people faced difficulties when it came to finding a place in the Renaissance, and Bonner's writing of a half-white woman added to the variations of representations in the movement. Bonner's writings were also alternative due to the fact that she did not venture into African idealism, but instead focused on the time period at hand, and settings in and around Chicago.

== Author ==
Marita Bonner was born on June 16, 1898 (although usually reported as 1899) and died in 1971. Her writings, although scarce, revealed both the underlying and materialistic impact of racism (scattered newspapers, shoes and books, ragged chairs). She was a pioneer in reclaiming racist images (Mammy figures) and subverting them to progressive representations of Black people. She gave vignettes from the point of view of the "invisible" black subjects and believed that views on certain neighborhoods were stifled by outside forces, which caused her characteristic appeal to the spiritual realm in her plays.

Similar to other Black female playwrights of her time, Bonner's writings combatted racism and sexism. Through characters like Dot, Bonner points out the layered oppression and layered strife they must overcome in order to find salvation. Bonner did not stray to show a character's success or failure in achieving such (Dot's death).

== Productions ==
Similar to other works of black female playwrights from the Renaissance, Bonner's works have not been performed on the stage frequently. Exit: An Illusion first premiered in New York by the Xoregos Theatre Company in 2015, 86 years after it was written.

== See also ==
- The Purple Flower
- Harlem Renaissance
- Georgia Douglas Johnson
- Colorism
- Racism in the 1920s
