= Ottie Beatrice Graham =

American writer (1901–1944)

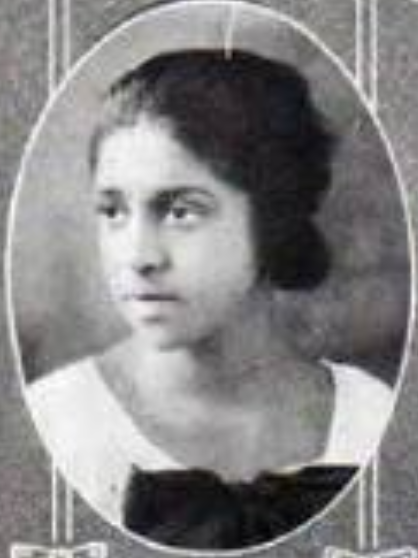
- From the 1922 yearbook of Howard University
- Born: December 11, 1901; Virginia, U.S.
- Died: March 31, 1944 (aged 42); Harrisburg, Pennsylvania, U.S.
- Other name: Ottie B. Jefferson (after 1925)
- Education: Howard University
- Occupation: Writer
- Spouse: William Guss Jefferson (m. 1925) (died 1941)
- Children: 1

Ottie Beatrice Graham Jefferson (December 11, 1901 – March 31, 1944) was an American writer associated with the Harlem Renaissance cultural movement.

== Early life and education ==
Graham was born in Virginia, United States, and raised in Philadelphia, the daughter of Rev. Wesley Faul Graham and Josephine A. Shields Graham. Her father was a Baptist clergyman and insurance executive. She graduated from William Penn High School for Girls in Philadelphia in 1918. She studied drama with Thomas Montgomery Gregory, was active in the first productions of the Howard Players, and graduated from Howard University in 1922. She was a member of the Delta Sigma Theta sorority.

== Career ==
Graham's "To A Wild Rose" was awarded first prize in a student fiction contest, by the judges Arthur B. Spingarn, Jessie Redmon Fauset, and W. E. B. Du Bois. She starred in a production of her own one-act play The King's Carpenters (1921) at the Harlem YWCA in 1922. Later in her life, she taught school in Pennsylvania.

== Publications ==
- The King's Carpenters (1921, one-act play)
- Holiday (1923, one-act play)
- "To A Wild Rose" (1923, short story)
- "Blue Aloes" (1924, short story)
- "Slackened Caprice" (1924, short story)

== Personal life ==
Graham married physician and musician William Guss Jefferson in 1925. They lived in Steelton, Pennsylvania, and had a son, Michael Graham Jefferson, born in 1927. Her husband died by suicide in December 1941, and she died in March 1944, at the age of 42, at a hospital in Harrisburg. Her stories have been included in several anthologies of African-American women's writing.
