= Thomas Montgomery Gregory =

American dramatist

- Citizenship: American
- Education: Howard University; Columbia University
- Occupations: dramatist, educator. activist, philosopher
- Movement: Black Renaissance in DC; National Negro Theatre

Thomas Montgomery Gregory (August 31, 1887 – November 21, 1971) was a dramatist, educator, social philosopher and activist, historian and a leading figure in the National Negro Theatre Movement.

Montgomery Gregory, a native of Washington, D.C., was key in cultivating and nurturing the concept of a National Negro Theatre Movement during the early decades of the 20th century against the backdrop of an 80-year-old minstrel tradition and the popularity of Black-themed dramatic works by white writers, underscored by the commercially fledgling efforts of Black playwrights in America.

== The Howard Players ==
At Howard University, Gregory founded the acclaimed college theater troupe, The Howard Players. Formerly, the university's theatre interests were served by the College Dramatic Club, developed in 1909 by English instructor Ernest Just and a group of students. Gregory was the organizer of the Howard University Department of Dramatic Art and Public Speaking in 1921 and co-creator with Alain Locke of The Stylus literary club.

Gregory was appointed the first director of the drama department and was joined in his efforts by acting coach Marie Moore Forrest and stage designer Cleon Throckmorton of the Provincetown Players. The department's course in Pageantry and Drama was the first of its kind in the U.S. to be offered for credit. Through his work at Howard, Gregory generated national interest in legitimate Black drama, collaborating with important playwrights such as Willis Richardson, Paul Green, and Eugene O'Neill, and creating, via The Howard Players, a critically acclaimed forum for student-written plays and performances. George Pierce Baker of the 47 Workshop at Harvard University cited The Howard Players as one of the two most creative college theatre companies in the United States, with The Carolina Playmakers of the University of North Carolina being the other.

== Early life ==
Gregory was educated at Williston Seminary (1902-1906), then Harvard University, graduating in the celebrated Class of 1910 which included T. S. Eliot, Walter Lippmann and John Reed. His father, James Monroe Gregory, who transferred from Oberlin College in 1868 to become the first student enrolled in Howard University's College Department, was in the university's first graduating class of three men, and stayed on as a member of the faculty. His mother, Fannie Emma Hagan, a former Howard student of Madagascan descent, was an independent-minded woman, who, while a Howard faculty spouse, mentored young students and devoted much of her life to the up-liftment of “colored women.”

The family's home on the Howard campus stood on the present site of the Ira Aldridge Theatre. The elder Gregory was instrumental in acquiring the first significant Congressional endowment for Howard. In 1897, the James Monroe Gregory family left Washington, D.C. for Bordentown, New Jersey, where Professor Gregory took the helm of the Bordentown Industrial and Manual Training School.

In 1910, after completing his studies at Harvard University, Montgomery Gregory was appointed English Instructor at Howard, rising quickly to Professor and, in 1919, Head of department. In 1918, he married Hugh Ella Hancock of Austin, Texas. Their offspring were writer/poet Yvonne (deceased), Thomas Montgomery Jr. (deceased), Hugh Hancock (deceased), Eugene Chandler (deceased), Mignon (deceased), and writer/former television producer Sheila Gregory Thomas, who resides in Washington, D.C.

In 1919, Gregory organized The Howard Players, and in 1921 became the first director of the newly organized division of Dramatic Art and Public Speaking. "During the period from 1919 to 1925, drama at the university reached a peak both financially and technically."2 It was during those years that Gregory began orchestrating his dream of a National Negro Theatre.

== Early career ==
Early in Gregory's career, he began to formulate the notion that the Black race could, and should necessarily, use the arts as a means for social change. He articulated his "empowerment through artistic achievement" framework in "Race in Art," an article for The Citizen, a Boston-based magazine, published in 1915 by Charles F. Lane, with Gregory, George W. Ellis, and William Stanley Braithwaite serving as editorial board members. "If art is self-expression, it is necessarily race expression," wrote Gregory. Not only had the Black race in America suffered from the perception of intellectual and artistic inferiority, Gregory argues in this lengthy treatise, but Black leaders of the period, he wrote, undermined Black ascendancy by advancing a negative "race attitude," while encouraging Black people to mimic the tone and texture of Euro-Americanism:

"… By race attitude I mean the attitude of the individual members of the Negro race to the race itself. For instead of cultivating a race pride, a race self-respect, a race consciousness, we have sought to un-race ourselves, to avoid whatever might definitely associate us with the Negro race. Even the name itself is to many a stigma and an insult! Goaded by injustice and prejudice we have sought to offset them by disowning the race.”

In March 1921, after successful runs of works by Lord Dunsany (“The Lost Silk Hat”) and Booth Tarkington (“Beauty and the Jacobean”), as well as other productions, Gregory aroused the interest of national theater critics with a performance of Eugene O’Neill's "The Emperor Jones" before a non-segregated audience at the Shubert-Belasco Theatre in Washington, D.C.

Most extraordinary was the presence of Charles Gilpin, America's most celebrated Negro actor of the period, recreating the title role for which he, that same year, had been named one of the ten best actors for his performance in O'Neill's New York production of the play. The Howard Players performed as the supporting cast before "an audience that was far less in numbers than merited. …"

Although "Jones" was the product of a white playwright's vision of a tragic Black figure, Gregory saw the work as an important vehicle toward a sustained, legitimate Negro-centered theater. "... for the histrionic ability of Charles Gilpin has been as effective as the dramatic genius of Eugene O'Neill – the serious play of Negro life broke through to public favor and critical recognition."

With the notion of introducing the evolving artistry of the Negro to the world stage, in 1921 Gregory also organized a performance of Ridgely Torrence's “Simon, the Cyrenian” by the Howard Players for the delegates to the World Disarmament Conference.

The meritorious events, however, were but steps toward Gregory's National Negro Theatre, for which he groomed young Negro dramatists to provide plays in which Black actors could present Black themes largely for the benefit of Blacks, however, played outside "established theaters in the Negro districts, for that would tend to prevent the white community from seeing their art…"

== Influence on Social Change ==
Gregory's contradictions between his "race attitude" dissertation and his efforts to market Black theatre to white audiences in an attempt to create social change, are immutable considerations. On this score, his steady promotion of Black-authored plays of Negro life gives pause for discussion. Consider Gregory's review of Jessie Fauset’s novel, There is Confusion (1924). Here he appears, exclusively, to advocate — at least on the consumer end — Black art, primarily, for Black audiences: "If our poets, novelists, and dramatists are to succeed we must form a large reading public for the products of their pens. Let the slogan be: Read the works of our own writers first!”7

The range of Gregory’s ideas and influences were also evident in his work with Howard's student dramatists. "[At Howard University] an attempt is being made to build a structure of native Negro drama, to be interpreted by people of that race," wrote Leonard Hall, a Washington D.C. theater critic, citing the works of then-student Helen Webb (“Genefrede”), and Howard alumna De Reath Irene Byrd Beausey (“The Yellow Tree”), as cornerstones of an emerging "native Negro drama."Poet, playwright, anthologist, and educator May Miller, daughter of Kelly Miller, a Howard University scholar and administrator, also enjoyed relative success under Gregory’s tutelage with a Players production of “Within the Shadow” in 1920. Writer/choreographer Ottie Beatrice Graham, another member of the drama program and Gregory's student, wrote at least two of her one-act plays while in his class, “The King’s Carpenters” (1921), which appeared in The Stylus, and “Holiday,” later published in Crisis.

== The Negro in Drama ==
In 1927, Gregory contributed “The Negro in Drama” to the 14th edition of the Encyclopædia Britannica. In late winter, Gregory and Locke's Plays of Negro Life was published. The collection of twenty-two works by well-and lesser-known playwrights includes Howard drama student Thelma Myrtle Duncan's "The Death Dance" and works by Georgia Douglas Johnson, Jean Toomer, Eulalie Spence, Willis Richardson, Richard Bruce, John Matheus, Ernest H. Culbertson, Paul Green, and Eugene O'Neill, with illustrations by artist Aaron Douglas.

Both Gregory and Locke refer to themselves in Plays as "formally Professor of …," an ironic gesture since both men had, at some point in their careers, been "encouraged" or forced to leave the university.

== Later life ==
Gregory's resignation was tendered in 1912 after an anonymous letter to the university's president accused the 23-year-old professor of a drunken display at a Washington D.C. bar. A "who's who" army of Gregory defenders, which included longtime friend William A. Sinclair and Booker T. Washington, gracefully negotiated on the young professor's behalf. Gregory was reinstated the following year. A second and final resignation came eleven years later, in August 1924, when Gregory opted for a position as Supervisor of Negro Schools, and later Principal, in Atlantic City, New Jersey, which offered "a broader field of service and a very considerable increase of salary."10 Locke exited the university the following year, returning at a later time. In New Jersey, Gregory continued to promote Negro drama. In 1929 he undertook a tour of the South lecturing at eight State summer schools on educational and community drama. In 1956, he retired, and in 1960 returned to Washington. Gregory died after a long battle with leukemia, in Washington's Sibley Hospital, November 21, 1971.

Gregory was the maternal great-grandfather of actress and comedian Aisha Tyler. His wife Hugh Ella was the granddaughter of U.S. congressman John Hancock.
