= Songs of the Harlem River =

Songs of the Harlem River: Forgotten One Acts of the Harlem Renaissance is a collection of five one-act plays written between 1920 and 1930 by several African-American playwrights at the time including Marita Bonner, Ralf M. Coleman, Georgia Douglas Johnson, Willis Richardson, and Eulalie Spence. Also included are poems by Sterling A. Brown, Langston Hughes, and Jessie Fauset.

The world premiere of Songs of the Harlem River was produced with Theater for the New City at the Xoregos Performing Company as a part of NYC's Dream Up Festival where it played six performances in August and September 2015, directed and choreographed by Sheila Xoregos. Each one-act play tackled a contemporary issue during the Harlem Renaissance including the Women's Voting Rights Act, lynching, Harlem life, and bi-racism.

Songs of the Harlem River also opened the Langston Hughes Festival in Queens, New York on February 13, 2016.

== Synopsis and description ==
- The plays delve into the happenings of love and the difficulties of life in Harlem during the Harlem Renaissance.
- Jazz music is used to signify the popular music of the decade. Artists included: Jean Moreau Gottschalk, Ray Henderson and Shelton Brooks.
- Choreographed dance can be set to the poetry sequences.
- All the one-acts, as a collection, are performed straight through without any breaks or intermissions, so as to unify the otherwise quick, disjoined concepts within each of the stories.

== Plays ==
- The Girl from Bama by Ralf M. Coleman (1929)
- The Deacon's Awakening by Willis Richardson (1920)
- Blue-Eyed Black Boy by Georgia Douglas Johnson (ca. 1930)
- Exit, An Illusion by Marita Bonner (1927)
- The Starter by Eulalie Spence (1927)

=== The Girl from Bama ===
Characters: Della, Jazz Barrett, Dr. Lee

Summary: A young southern girl Della, trapped in a relationship with a numbers “banker” Jazz Barrett who doesn’t want to marry her, decides to run away with an old flame Dr. Lee.

=== The Deacon's Awakening ===
Characters: Martha Jones, David Jones, Sol, Ruth Jones, Daughter

Summary: Martha defends her daughter’s presence at a meeting advocating for the passing of the Nineteenth Amendment to her husband David and his associate Sol.

=== Blue-Eyed Black Boy ===
Characters: Pauline, Rebecca, Dr. Thomas Grey, Hester Grant

Summary: After discovering that her son has been arrested and people are calling for a lynching, Pauline does what she can to save him.

=== Exit, An Illusion ===
Characters: Dott, Buddy, The Lover

Summary: Death comes to a sick biracial girl in Harlem in the guise of a romantic lover.

=== The Starter ===
Characters: T.J., Georgia, Two Ladies

Summary: T.J. and Georgia share a park bench and talk about their jobs, social standing, and love.

== Poems ==
- Odyssey of Big Boy by Sterling A. Brown.
- Mother to Son and I, Too by Langston Hughes.
- Words! Words! by Jessie Fauset.

== Themes ==
Lynching, African American life in Harlem ca. 1920, sexism in the African-American Community, African-American theatre ca. 1920, bi-racism, social and financial standing of African-Americans during the Harlem Renaissance.

=== Bi-Racism ===
Bi-racism is defined as an inability to conceive the notion that someone's parents could be of a different skin color. This element is particularly present in Bonnor's Exit, An Illusion, where Dot encounters death through the illusion of a lover.

=== Classism ===
Classism and even classist undertones can be deduced from certain plays within the collection such as in "The Starter," where the two main characters spend their stage time discussing their class and social standing in the form of their jobs.

=== Romance/Love ===
Also in "The Starter," another topic discussed by T.J. and Georgia is love. In "The Girl From Bama," romance drives Della to steal away with Dr. Lee when she is forced to marry Jazz Barrett, a banker. Love is also clearly a topic throughout some others of the plays that aren't specifically characterized as "romantic," such as in "The Deacon's Awakening," where the character of Martha advocates for her daughter by strongly defending the proposed nineteenth amendment.

=== Sexism ===
As a result of romantic elemental themes during the time period these plays take place in, sexism comes into play throughout a number of the stories. Some characters are solely driven by their sexist desires and undertones, while others are oppressed by the unavoidable linkage that their characters have to other sexist individuals.

== Productions ==
Songs of the Harlem River: Forgotten One Acts of the Harlem Renaissance was first produced by the Xoregos Performing Company as a part of the NYC Dream Up Festival from August 30 to September 6, 2015. It also opened the Langston Hughes Festival in Queens, New York on February 13, 2016.

=== Original Cast ===
Michèle Cannon
Carol Carter
Andrew R. Cooksey
Yohanna Florentino
Michael A. Jones
Lambert Tamin
Mike Jones
Jessie Jordan
Jak Watson

Eight actors play all of the roles in the five plays.
