= Eulalie Spence =

American dramatist

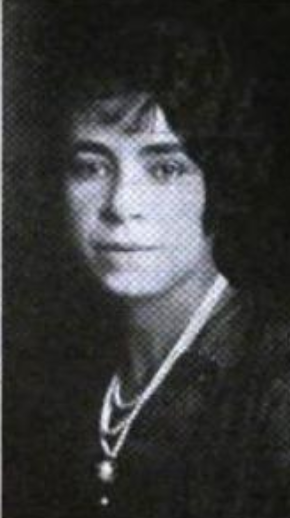
- Eulalie Spence, from a 1928 publication
- Born: June 11, 1894; Nevis, British West Indies
- Died: March 7, 1981 (aged 86); Gettysburg, Pennsylvania, US
- Occupations: Playwright, teacher

Eulalie Spence (June 11, 1894 – March 7, 1981) was a writer, teacher, director, actress and playwright from the British West Indies. She was an influential member of the Harlem Renaissance, writing fourteen plays, at least five of which were published. Spence, who described herself as a "folk dramatist" who made plays for fun and entertainment, was considered one of the most experienced female playwrights before the 1950s, and received more recognition than other black playwrights of the Harlem Renaissance period, winning several competitions. She presented several plays with W.E.B. Du Bois's Krigwa Players, of which she was a member from 1926 to 1928. Spence was also a mentor to theatrical producer Joseph Papp, founder of The Public Theater and the accompanying festival currently known as Shakespeare in the Park.

== Early life ==
Spence was born on the island of Nevis in the British West Indies on June 11, 1894, to Robert and Eno Lake Spence, the oldest of seven girls. She spent her formative years on her father's sugar plantation. The plantation was destroyed by a hurricane, and she moved to New York City with her family in 1902, living in Harlem before eventually settling in Brooklyn. Her niece Patricia Hart, described Spence as "prim, proper and ultracorrect in speech and dress, yes – but she was gentle, generous and loving and the backbone of a family of seven girls." Because of her father's difficulty in finding steady employment, Spence and her family lived in meager circumstances, crowded in a small apartment in Brooklyn. Poverty forced their mother to make clothes from discarded uniform fabric at the school where she worked, and there was a great sense of loss when their father "gave up his dream of returning to their homeland." Moreover, she was quite aware that West Indians were not welcomed by the indigenous black population. Despite her difficult circumstances, Spence had many positive influences, particularly from her mother. Spence's mother often read to her as a child, and the strong, independent nature she displayed, served as a model for Spence, both in her own life and in the female characters she created in her plays.

=== Education ===
Spence overcame her impoverished childhood and managed to obtain an exceptional education. She graduated from Wadleigh High School and the New York Training School for Teachers. In 1924 she was a student at the National Ethiopian Art Theatre School, which was dedicated to the training and employment of black actors. Spence received a B.A. in 1937 from New York University and an M.A. in speech in 1939 from Teacher's College, Columbia University, where she studied under Hatcher Hughes. Spence began teaching in the New York public school system in 1918, including over thirty years (1927-1958) at the Eastern District High School in Brooklyn, where she taught elocution, English, and dramatics. One of her students during that time was Joseph Papp, a playwright and producer who founded The Public Theater in 1954.

== Writing career ==
W. E. B. Du Bois, founder and editor of The Crisis, the monthly journal of the N.A.A.C.P., surmised that Black Drama must be built from scratch, by Blacks for a Black theater. In 1926, he founded Krigwa (Crisis Guild of Writers and Artists), originally known as Crigwa. Krigwa sponsored a yearly literary contest that included a playwriting competition and fostered a theater company, the Krigwa Players, which rehearsed and performed at the 135th St. branch of the New York Public Library. The contest, originally titled "The Amy Spingarn Prizes in Literature and Art", was held in 1925 and 1926, and was funded by Amy Spingarn, wife of Joel Elias Spingarn, who was treasurer of the N.A.A.C.P. at the time, and later served as president. Mrs. Spingarn contributed over $1200.00 to prize winners. Spence finished second in the 1926 Krigwa playwriting contest for her one act play Foreign Mail. She also won a second place prize for Her, which was entered into a contest held by Opportunity, a magazine published by Charles S. Johnson. In 1927, Fool’s Errand, with sets designed by artist Aaron Douglas competed in the Fifth Annual International Little Theatre Tournament, a first for Blacks since the finalists competed in a Broadway theatre. The Krigwa Players won one of four $200.00 prizes and the play was published by Samuel French. Undertow tied for third place in the 1927 Crisis contest. Spence's play The Hunch, won second place in the 1927 Opportunity contest, while The Starter won third place, and was included in Plays of Negro Life, an early collection of African-American theater written by Alain Locke and Montgomery Gregory.

Spence's play Her opened the Krigwa Players' second season, and her sisters, Olga and Doralene Spence, acted in the Krigwa Players' productions, with both receiving praise for their acting performances. Doralene Spence went on to replace Rose McClendon as the lead role in In Abraham's Bosom at the Cherry Lane Theatre in 1927. Critic William E. Clarke wrote in the New York Age, “Her…was by far the best of the bill. It was a ghost story and was written with such skill that it rose to the heights of a three-act tragedy that might have been written by a Eugene [O’Neill]." Another play by Spence, On Being Forty, went unpublished, but was presented publicly on at least two occasions, on October 15, 1924 by the National Ethiopian Art Theatre, and a presentation in Newark, New Jersey by the Bank Street Players, the first Little Negro Theater in New Jersey, on May 6, 1927. Spence also directed two plays, Before Breakfast by Eugene O'Neill and Joint Owners in Spain by Alice Brown for the Dunbar Garden Players, a short-lived theater group that was named in honor of Paul Laurence Dunbar.

=== Dispute with W.E.B. DuBois and the end of the Krigwa Players ===
The plays of Eulalie Spence helped to make a name for the Krigwa Players amongst both Black and white critics., however, Spence and Du Bois did not see eye to eye, artistically or politically. Du Bois felt that theatre should be used as a vehicle for propaganda to advance the cause of the American Negro. Spence, on the other hand, always acutely aware that she was from the West Indies, had a different outlook on the theatre. She felt that the theatre was a place for people to be entertained and not antagonized by the problems of society. In a 1928 essay for Opportunity she wrote, "The white man is cold and unresponsive to this subject and the Negro, himself, is hurt and humiliated by it. We go to the theatre for entertainment, not to have old fires and hates rekindled." Du Bois tried several times to get Spence to write politically themed drama but she refused. Spence "insisted that plays obey the rules of dramatic form, not a political agenda." Du Bois took the $200.00 prize money from the 1927 Little Theatre Tournament and used it to reimburse production expenses and paid neither the actors nor Spence. The Krigwa Players disbanded as a result.

=== The Whipping ===
Spence's only three-act play was her last, The Whipping, adapted from a novel written by Roy Flannagan. The story is about a promiscuous young white woman whose arrival in town causes a scandal among the local people. She is attacked by the Ku Klux Klan in an attempt to scare her away. She instead frames the Klan, and uses the media attention to start a movie career. The plot about a white woman subverting the Klan was unique for an African-American female writer in the Harlem Renaissance, as black women of that era wrote mostly about black folk life. Spence crossed racial barriers when she approached the white author to secure publishing rights, and by hiring a white agent, Audrey Wood, who also represented Tennessee Williams. Spence cast Queenie Smith, a popular Broadway actress in the 1920s, in the lead role for the play, which was scheduled to open at the Empress Theatre in Danbury, Connecticut in 1933. The production was canceled without explanation four days before it was to open, and a disheartened Spence optioned the screenplay to Paramount Pictures for $5000.00. Although her play never reached the stage, it remains significant because it represents one of the earliest attempts to enter commercial theater by an African-American writer. According to some sources her screenplay was never made into a film, but in a 1973 interview Spence revealed that her screenplay was filmed as Ready for Love, a 1934 film starring Ida Lupino and Richard Arlen and directed by Marion Gering. The discrepancy is likely due to the fact that she was not listed in the film credits.

== Writing style ==
Eulalie Spence developed a sensitivity towards race and gender from memories of her parents' struggles as black immigrants. Spence's plays were mostly comedies, although she did write three dramatic works: Her, Undertow, and La Davina Pastora. Spence wrote "folk plays", which tended to focus on the everyday lives of African-Americans, particularly domestic life, shunning Du Bois' belief that the black theater should be used for propaganda, or "race plays." Her plays often included a love triangle, with weak male characters contrasting against the strong personalities of the female characters. Although Spence said that this contrast was likely from her experiences at home with a quiet, soft-spoken father who left all the decisions to his wife, the differences between her male and female characters was unintentional.

In a 1924 review, writer George S. Schuyler criticized Spence's play On Being Forty for its inability to connect with the audience and for having characters that were "not true to Negro life." The review of On Being Forty was mostly negative, but it did hint at dramatic depth that would make Spence's 1927 play Undertow one of her lasting works, and one of the few plays from the Harlem Renaissance era that can be successfully produced today. Undertow is about a woman who returns to Harlem after many years in the South to take back the man she loves, from his wife. The hint of racial overtones is also present in the script, as the man's dark-skinned wife is obsessed with light skin of his former lover, and she eventually destroys their attempt to reunite. Spence uses the ethnicity of the characters in Undertow as part of plot development, instead of racial propaganda. Spence did not agree with Du Bois' political views in regards to the theater, but her plays are not entirely apolitical. She frequently addressed issues such as racism, infidelity, and the roles of women, using comedy as a medium because she felt it provided other ways, such as satire, to bring awareness to the African-American experience. While her characters "were undeniably black", Spence avoided racial themes in her plays in favor of universal themes.

=== Use of black dialect ===
Spence was a disciple of Alain Locke, who believed that black theatre "should woo its audiences into appreciating its African roots." During the mid-1920s, a time when there was conflict about how African-Americans should be represented on stage, she insisted on using Black dialect in her plays. In 1929, when asked by Willis Richardson to submit a play without dialect, she replied that she was "very sorry indeed, that I have no play on hand suitable for the book you have in mind." This response is an example of how important she felt the use of dialect was to accurately portray the characters she wrote about, many of whom were poor and lived in urban environments that included prostitution and gambling. Spence's use of black dialect onstage, considered "a bold and dangerous choice", actually "underscored race consciousness" by dramatizing black women's struggle to maintain racial and gender identity. According to Adrienne Macki Braconi, "Spence's work serves as a paradigm to examine the presence of dialect on the stage in black drama, taking into account how linguistic patterns confirm ethnicity on-stage and what that suggests in performance."

== Legacy ==
Eulalie Spence was considered one of the Harlem Renaissance's rising young playwrights, although she did not have a great deal of financial success. W.E.B. Du Bois' refusal to give Spence a share of the award money won by her play at the National Little Theatre Tournament eventually led to the end of the Krigwa Players. The $5000.00 payment she received for her screenplay of The Whipping was the only compensation she ever received as a writer. Spence, who never married, retreated from public life after The Whipping and focused on her work as a high school teacher, while she continued to write and act for Columbia University's Laboratory Players.

=== Influence on Joe Papp ===
Spence was a progressive thinker who challenged her students to discuss social norms. Teaching in a predominantly white classroom, she encouraged her students to think about race and gender in the literature they studied, something that was unheard of prior to the 1960s. Theatrical producer Joe Papp called Eulalie Spence "the most influential force in his life." He continued to speak about her in reverential terms even fifty years after he was a student in her classroom, at Eastern District High School, where she was the only black teacher. Papp credited Spence with "scrubbing his tongue" of its Brooklyn accent and eliminating his "gutter speech" by teaching him grammar and proper enunciation. She brought actors to class and gave her students poetry and plays to read. Papp said that Spence "was interested in me. She made me feel good about myself. She took me under her wing. And she was interested in an area that I seemed to find interesting: language." Papp never forgot the impact of Spence on his life and career, but was unaware of her life as playwright, only learning about her theatrical work years later at a Harlem museum exhibit.

=== Re-assessment of her work ===
Contemporary scholars have tended to dismiss Spence's plays because of their inclusion of Black dialect and because of her inability to sustain a career in theatre. Spence has actually made a notable contribution to theatrical history, especially in relation to the art theatre movement and the history of African American theatre. She was responsible for a major shift in attitudes on dialects in race drama by the mid 1920s. Many modern critics hold Spence in high esteem, such as Elizabeth Brown-Guillory, who said that Spence could be credited with "initiating feminism in plays by black women", and James Hatch and Ted Shine, who noted that Spence was one of the first to write "black characters into non-racial plots." Hatch and Shine also called Spence one of the best craftswomen of the Harlem Renaissance, and probably the only playwright of the period to formally attend classes in dramatic structure."

=== Modern performances of her plays ===
Spence has been overshadowed by the counterparts of her day such as Langston Hughes, Zora Neale Hurston, and James Weldon Johnson, although in recent years scholars have reconsidered her work along with other lesser known African-American female writers such as May Miller and Pauline Elizabeth Hopkins. Eulalie Spence's play Hot Stuff, a story about Harlem street hustlers, was presented on stage in February and March 2007 by The American Century Theater of Arlington, Virginia (TACT) as part of Drama Under the Influence, a collection of one-act plays written by women during the 1920s. The production was conceived and directed by Steve Mazzola. Included along with Spence's work were plays by Sophie Treadwell, Gertrude Stein, Dorothy Parker, Susan Glaspell and Rita Wellman. The Xoregos Performing Company opened its Harlem Remembered program on February 14, 2015 with a performance of Spence's play The Hunch. The production was directed by Shela Xoregos, and had nine shows February 14–28, 2015 in New York City, Yonkers and Newburgh, in New York state. Her play The Starter premiered in Xoregos Performing Company's program Songs of the Harlem River in New York City's Dream Up Festival, August 30-September 6, 2015. Songs of the Harlem River also opened the Langston Hughes Festival in Queens, New York on February 13, 2016. "She's Got Harlem On Her Mind," a trio of three plays, "Hot Stuff," "The Starter," and "The Hunch," opened in February, 2023 at the Metropolitan Playhouse in New York City.

== Death ==
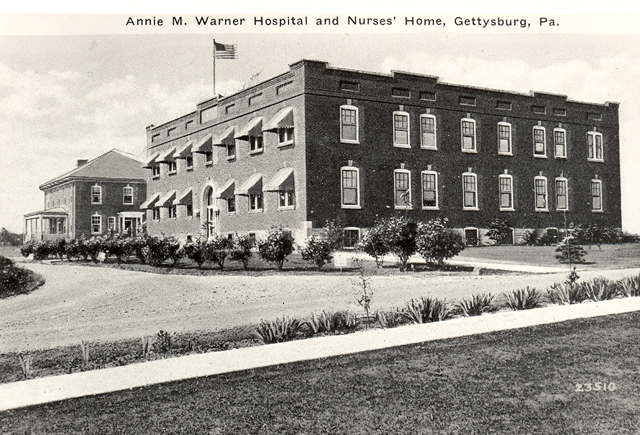
Annie M Warner Hospital and Nurses Home, Gettysburg Pa. Eulalie Spence was in this hospital at the time of her death.

Eulalie Spence died in Gettysburg, Pennsylvania, on March 7, 1981, at the age of 86. She had been living at the home of her niece, Patricia Hart, and died at the Warner Hospital. Hart occasionally corresponded with writers inquiring about her aunt, providing photos and additional biographical information. Spence's obituary did not mention her career as a playwright, saying only that she was a retired schoolteacher.

== Written works ==
=== Plays ===
- The Starter (1923)
- On Being Forty (This play was never published, but was first presented on October 15, 1924 at the Lafayette Theater in Harlem. No extant copies of the script have been found.)
- Foreign Mail (1926)
- Fool’s Errand (1927)
- Her (1927)
- Hot Stuff (1927)
- The Hunch (1927)
- Undertow (1927)
- Episode (1928)
- La Divina Pastora (1929)
- The Whipping (1934)

=== Essays ===
- "A Criticism of the Negro Drama as it Relates to the Negro Dramatist and Artist." Opportunity, June 28, 1928.
- "Negro Art Players in Harlem." Opportunity, December, 1928.

== See also ==
- Harlem Renaissance
