= Audrey Couloumbis =

American children's author

- Born: Audrey Darnell Peyton; August 9, 1947; Springfield, Illinois, USA
- Occupation: Author
- Writing career
- Genre: Children's literature

Audrey Couloumbis (born August 9, 1947) is an American children's author. Her novel Getting Near to Baby was a Newbery Honor recipient in 2000.

== Biography ==
Audrey Peyton was born in Springfield, Illinois. Her parents separated; her mother remarried when Peyton was two years old. Peyton's father worked as an electrician for various traveling productions during much of her childhood, and she often traveled to visit him while he was onsite in locations around the world.

She married Akila Couloumbis on September 7, 1967; the couple have two children.

Couloumbis' debut book, Just Before Daybreak, was published in 1987. Her next work, and her first for children, Getting Near to Baby, was published in 1999. It was named a Newbery Honor title in 2000. Her later books include Say Yes (2002), Summer's End (2005), and The Misadventures of Maude March; or, Trouble Rides a Fast Horse (2005).
