= Frank Smith Horne =

American poet (1899–1974)

Dr. Frank Smith Horne
- Born: August 18, 1899; New York City, U.S.
- Died: September 7, 1974 (aged 75); New York City, U.S.
- Other name: Xavier I
- Education: City College of New York; Northern Illinois College of Ophthalmology; University of Southern California
- Occupations: Lyricist; poet; government official
- Office: Dean and President (acting), Fort Valley Normal and Industrial School (1927-1936); Assistant Director, Division of Negro Affairs, National Youth Administration (1936); Assistant Director, United States Housing Authority (1938)
- Movement: Harlem Renaissance; Black Renaissance in DC
- Spouses: Frankye Priestly Burn (m. 1930; died 1939); Mercedes Rector (m. 1950)
- Relatives: Lena Horne (niece)

Frank Smith Horne was an American lyricist, poet, and government official who was an influential figure in the Harlem Renaissance. He was a member of President Franklin Delano Roosevelt's Black Cabinet where he served as Assistant Director of the Division of Negro Affairs, National Youth Administration. Later, Horne worked for the Housing and Home Finance Agency and helped to found the National Committee Against Discrimination in Housing (NCDH).

== Early life and education ==
Frank Smith Horne was born and raised in Brooklyn, New York by Edwin Fletcher Horne and Cora Calhoun Horne. He was raised Catholic and had three brothers, Errol, John Burke, and Edwin Fletcher Jr. Horne's father was a private contractor and builder. His parents were early members of the National Association for the Advancement of Colored People and well-known members of middle class Black New York.

Horne attended the City College of New York, graduating in 1921 with a Bachelor of Science. Horne received an optometry degree from Northern Illinois College of Ophthalmology in 1923. In 1932, he graduated from the University of Southern California with a Master's Degree.

== Career ==
From 1922 through 1926, Horne practiced optometry through private practice in Chicago and New York City. In 1927, Horne moved to Georgia, where he was the dean and acting president of Fort Valley Normal and Industrial School in Fort Valley, Georgia, until 1936. In 1938, Mary McLeod Bethune asked Horne to join Roosevelt's Black Cabinet as the Assistant Director of the Division of Negro Affairs, National Youth Administration, and he accepted the position. In 1938, Horne began working as the Assistant Director for the United States Housing Authority.

Horne was designated a member of the Civil Service Committee of Expert Examiners for the Housing and Home Finance Agency (HHFA) in 1949 and in May 1950, he conducted research into the economic situation of Negro war workers for the HHFA. Horne was a founder of the National Committee Against Discrimination in Housing (NCDH).

In October 1953, the Eisenhower Administration made an effort to dismiss Horne, and he was consequently reassigned as the "Assistant to the Administrator" of HHFA, which he considered a demotion. In 1954, Horne's colleague, Edward Rutledge, was accused of being a communist sympathizer, and Horne participated in Rutledge's defense. Horne also conducted a fight to protect Leon Condol, a disabled World War I veteran. Horne and his assistant, Corriene Morrow, were terminated from the HHFA in 1955 because of Republican National Committee's hostility toward Horne's policies. Horne returned to New York City in 1956 and began working in city government. He was appointed as the Executive Director of the New York City Commission on Intergroup Relations by Mayor Robert Wagner.

In 1960, Horne wrote an anthology of poetry titled, "Haverstraw" which was published in 1963. Throughout his career, Horne's poetry appeared in work appeared in Crisis Magazine and Opportunity: A Journal of Negro Life.

Horne became a consultant in human relations in the Housing and Redevelopment Board in New York City in 1962, and served the board until to 1973. In October 1964, he helped the National Committee Against Discrimination in Housing in writing a Ten Year Plan aimed at ending discrimination in housing. In 1967, he helped to set up the Metropolitan Applied Research Center. That same year, Horne was awarded the plaque of the Housing and Urban Renewal Conference for "dauntless courage... in the battle for open housing." The mayor of New York City, John V. Lindsay, appointed Horne as the Assistant Administrator for Equal Opportunity in the Housing and Development Administration (HDA). Horne later received an award from the Housing and Development Administration for his work in human relations. In April 1969, Horne participated in the establishment of a Joint Research Training Program between the Metropolitan Applied Research Center and the HDA. Horne began the initial research for the history of Racial Relations Service in 1970 and retired from the HDA in 1972. Horne then accepted a consulting job with the NCDH.

== Personal life ==
On August 19, 1930, Horne married his wife, Frankye Priestly Burn in the Little Church Around the Corner in New York City. Burn died in 1939 at the Tuberculosis League Hospital. In 1950, Horne married Mercedes Rector. Horne is the uncle of actress and civil rights activist Lena Horne, and briefly served as her guardian when she began her film career. Lena lived with him from 1927 to 1929. In 1960, Horne suffered a stroke which partially paralyzed the right side of his body. During his time in the hospital, Horne wrote a collection of poetry titled, Haverstraw. Horne died on September 7, 1974, from arteriosclerosis.

== Publications ==
=== Nonfiction ===
- "Black Verse," Opportunity: A Journal of Negro Life, November 1924, pp. 330–332.
- "I Am Initiated into the Negro Race," Opportunity: A Journal of Negro Life, May 1928, pp. 136–137.
- "The Epic of Fort Valley," Crisis Magazine, June 1929, pp. 190, 206-207.
- "Running Fools: Athletics in a Colored School," Crisis Magazine, November 1930, pp. 375–376.
- "Concerning White People," Opportunity:A Journal of Negro Life, March, 1934, p. 77-79.
- "The Industrial School of the South", Opportunity: A Journal of Negro Life, May 1935, pp. 136–139; June 1935, pp. 178–181.
- "Dog House Education," Journal of Negro Education, July 1936, p. 339.
- "Providing New Housing for Negroes," Opportunity: A Journal of Negro Life, October 1940, pp. 305–308.

=== Poetry ===
- (As Xavier I) "Letters Found near a Suicide," Crisis Magazine, November 1925, pp. 12–13.
- "Harlem,” Crisis Magazine, June 1928, p. 196.
- "More Letters Found near a Suicide," Crisis Magazine, December 1929, p. 413.
- Haverstraw, Breman, 1963.
- "Balm in Gilead: A Christmas Jingle, Played with Trumpets and Muffled Drums," Crisis Magazine, December 1965, pp. 646-647.
- "Mamma!," Crisis Magazine, April 1966, p. 213.
- "He Won’t Stay Put: A Carol for All Seasons," Crisis Magazine, December 1970, pp. 403-404.

=== Short stories ===
- "The Man Who Wanted to Be Red: A Story," Crisis Magazine, July 1928, pp. 225–226, 242-243.
