= Marita Bonner =

American dramatist (1899–1971)

- Born: June 16, 1899; Boston, Massachusetts, U.S.
- Died: December 6, 1971 (aged 72); Chicago, Illinois, U.S.
- Other names: Marita Occomy; Marita Odette Bonner; Marita Odette Bonner Occomy; Marita Bonner Occomy; Joseph Maree Andrew
- Education: Brookline High School; Radcliffe College
- Occupations: Playwright; essayist
- Known for: Association with the Harlem Renaissance

Marita Bonner (June 16, 1899 – December 7, 1971), also known as Marieta Bonner, was an American writer, essayist, and playwright who is commonly associated with the Harlem Renaissance. Other names she went by were Marita Occomy, Marita Odette Bonner, Marita Odette Bonner Occomy, Marita Bonner Occomy, and Joseph Maree Andrew. On December 29, 1921, along with 15 other women, she chartered the Iota chapter of Delta Sigma Theta sorority.

== Life ==
Marita Bonner was born in Boston, Massachusetts, to Joseph and Anne Noel Bonner. Marita was one of four children and was brought up in a middle-class community in Massachusetts. She attended Brookline High School, where she contributed to the school magazine, The Sagamore. She excelled in German and Music, and was a very talented pianist. In 1917, she graduated from Brookline High School and in 1918 enrolled in Radcliffe College, commuting to campus because many African-American students were denied dormitory accommodation. In college, she majored in English and Comparative Literature, while continuing to study German and musical composition. At Radcliffe, African-American students were not permitted to board, and many either lived in houses off-campus set aside for black students, or commuted, as Bonner did. Bonner was an accomplished student at Radcliffe, founding the Radcliffe chapter of Delta Sigma Theta, a black sorority, and participating in many musical clubs (she twice won the Radcliffe song competition). She was also accepted to a competitive writing class that was open to 16 students, where her professor, Charles Townsend Copeland, encouraged her not to be "bitter" when writing, a descriptor often used for authors of color. In addition to her studies, she taught at a high school in Cambridge, Massachusetts.

After finishing her schooling in 1922, she continued to teach at Bluefield Colored Institute in West Virginia. Two years later, she took on a position at Armstrong High School in Washington, D.C., until 1930, during which time her mother and father both died suddenly. While in Washington, Bonner became closely associated with poet, playwright and composer Georgia Douglas Johnson. Johnson's "S Street salon" was an important meeting place for many of the writers and artists involved in the New Negro Renaissance.

While living in Washington D.C., Bonner met William Almy Occomy. They married and moved to Chicago, where Bonner's writing career took off. After marrying Occomy, she began to write under her married name. After 1941, Bonner gave up publishing her works and devoted her time to her family, including three children. She began teaching again in the 1940s and finally retired in 1963.

Bonner died on December 7, 1971, from smoke-inhalation complications at a hospital after her apartment caught fire. She was 72.

== Works ==
Throughout her life, Bonner wrote many short stories, essays and plays, and was a frequent contributor to The Crisis (the magazine of the National Association for the Advancement of Colored People) and Opportunity (official publication of the National Urban League) between 1925 and 1940. After her parents' death, she wrote her first essay, "On Being Young–A Woman–And Colored" (December 1925), which highlights the limits put on black Americans, especially black women, in New York (during this time), who lacked "the full-range of New Negro mobility." The speaker in this essay also addresses the residential segregation and social constraints she faced as a woman living in the "Black Ghetto", a community where black Americans were "shoved aside in a bundle because of color." Winner of the inaugural essay contest sponsored by The Crisis (whose literary editor at the time was Jessie Redmon Fauset), this essay encouraged black women not to dwell on their problems but to outsmart negative situations.

Bonner also wrote many short stories between 1925 and 1927, including "The Prison-Bound", "Nothing New", "One Boy's Story" and "Drab Rambles". Her short stories explored a multicultural universe filled with people drawn by the promises of urban life.

She wrote three plays — The Pot Maker (1927), The Purple Flower - A Play (1928) and Exit, an Illusion (1929) — the most famous being The Purple Flower, which portrays black liberation. Many of Bonner's later works, such as Light in Dark Places, dealt with poverty, poor housing, and color discrimination in the black communities, and shows the influence that the urban environment has on black communities. Bonner is one of the many frequently unrecognized black female writers of the Harlem Renaissance who resisted the universalizing, essentialist tendencies by focusing on atypical women rather than on an archetypal man, such as the New Negro," which can be seen in her earliest works. Bonner regularly discussed poverty, familial relations, urban living, colorism, feminism, and racism in her works. She also often wrote about multi-ethnic communities, such as in "Nothing New". Bonner was wholly opposed to generalizations of black experience, and wrote about several differing black experiences in her short stories and plays. She is thus remembered as an advocate for intersectionality and a documentarian of multicultural urban life.

Bonner sometimes wrote under the pseudonym Joseph Maree Andrew, such as when she penned “One Boy’s Story”, a short bildungsroman that details the life of a young black boy living in a white town. Bonner may have adopted this pseudonym as a reaction to the untimely death of her parents, namely her father, Joseph, who financially supported her schooling.

== Influences on the Harlem Renaissance ==
Bonner contributed a variety of things to the Harlem Renaissance. Her writings addressed the struggles of people who lived outside of Harlem. Her greatest involvement was her emphasis on claiming a strong racial and gender identity. She argued against sexism and racism and advised other black women to remain silent in order to gain understanding, knowledge, and truth to fight the oppression of race and gender. She also encouraged African Americans to use the weapons of knowledge, teaching, and writing to overcome inequalities. Unlike most Renaissance writers, she focused her writings on issues in and around Chicago. Several of Bonner's short stories addressed the barriers that African-American women faced when they attempted to follow the Harlem Renaissance's call for self-improvement through education and issues surrounding discrimination, religion, family, and poverty.

Although she was not often appreciated during her time and even today, perhaps one of Bonner's greatest contributions to the Harlem Renaissance was her emphasis on claiming not only a racial identity, but a gendered one as well. Bonner's works focused on the historical specificity of her time and place rather than the universality of an idealized African past. In "On Being Young -- A Woman -- And Colored", Bonner explores the necessarily layered identity of black womanhood, discussing the difficulties that come with belonging to two oppressed groups. She describes it as a "group within a group", and discusses the frustrations that come with expressing anger not only as a woman, but as a black woman - she is doubly expected to express her anger with her own oppression "gently and quietly", once from white society and once more from black male society. She is one of many writers whose efforts to discuss intersectionality have been dismissed, forgotten or largely eradicated from modern canon.

== Legacy ==
In more recent years, critical exploration of Marita Bonner has noticeably diminished, having been at its peak in the late 1980s.

Xoregos Performing Company premiered Exit: An Illusion in its 2015 program "Harlem Remembered", repeating the play with a different cast in its "Songs of the Harlem River" program in NYC's Dream Up Festival, August 30–September 6, 2015. Songs of the Harlem River opened the Langston Hughes Festival in Queens, NY, on February 13, 2016.

In 2017, Bonner was inducted into the Chicago Literary Hall of Fame.

== Bibliography ==
=== Short stories ===
- "The Hands - A Story". Opportunity: A Journal of Negro Life 3 (August 1925): 235–37.
- "The Prison-Bound". The Crisis 32 (September 1926): 225–26.
- "Nothing New". The Crisis 33 (November 1926): 17–20.
- "One Boy's Story". The Crisis 34 (November 1927): 297–99, 316–20 (pseudonym: Joseph Maree Andrew).
- "Drab Rambles". The Crisis 34 (December 1927): 335–36, 354–56.
- "A Possible Triad of Black Notes, Part One". Opportunity 11 (July 1933): 205–07.
- "A Possible Triad of Black Notes, Part Two: Of Jimmie Harris". Opportunity 11 (August 1933): 242–44.
- "A Possible Triad of Black Notes, Part Three: Three Tales of Living Corner Store". Opportunity 11 (September 1933): 269–71.
- "Tin Can". Opportunity 12 (July 1934): 202–205, (August 1934): 236–40.
- "A Sealed Pod". Opportunity 14 (March 1936): 88–91.
- "Black Fronts". Opportunity 16 (July 1938): 210–14.
- "Hate is Nothing". The Crisis 45 (December 1938): 388–90, 394, 403–04 (pseudonym: Joyce M. Reed).
- "The Makin's". Opportunity 17 (January 1939): 18–21.
- "The Whipping". The Crisis 46 (January 1939): 172–74.
- "Hongry Fire". The Crisis 46 (December 1939): 360–62, 376–77.
- "Patch Quilt". The Crisis 47 (March 1940): 71, 72, 92.
- "One True Love". The Crisis 48 (February 1941): 46–47, 58–59.

=== Essays ===
- "On Being Young–A Woman–And Colored". The Crisis (December 1925).
- "The Young Blood Hungers". The Crisis 35 (May 1928): 151, 172.
- "Review of Autumn Love Cycle, by Georgia Douglas Johnson". Opportunity 7 (April 1929): 130.

=== Drama ===
- "The Pot-Maker (A Play to be Read)". Opportunity 5 (February 1927): 43–46.
- "The Purple Flower". The Crisis (1928).
- "Exit - An Illusion". The Crisis 36 (October 1929): 335–36, 352.

== See also ==
- African Americans
- African-American culture
- African-American history
- African-American literature
- List of African-American writers
