= Getting Near to Baby =

1999 novel by Audrey Couloumbis

- Author: Audrey Couloumbis
- Illustrator: Ian Schoenherr
- Language: English
- Genre: Realistic fiction
- Publisher: G. P. Putnam's Sons; Penguin Young Readers Corp
- Publication date: September 13, 1999
- Publication place: United States
- Media type: Print (hardback & paperback)
- Pages: 211 pgs (first edition)
- Awards: Newbery Honor (2000)
- ISBN: 9780399233890

Getting Near to Baby is a 1999 children's novel by Audrey Couloumbis. It was awarded a Newbery Honor in 2000 and is an ALA Notable Children's Book. The book' is aimed at readers between the ages of 10 and 14.

Getting Near to Baby was influenced by the author's personal experience as a child, as her aunt experienced the death of a child due to cystic fibrosis. At the same time, a family living nearby had died of a bacterial illness by drinking tainted water.

== Plot summary ==
The characters Willa Jo and Little Sister are dealing with their grief after the death of their baby sister, who drank contaminated water. Their mother is unable to handle her own grief while caring for the two girls, and her sister, Patty, takes them to stay with her. Aunt Patty has no children, and her household is full of rules. Things become even more difficult for the girls because Aunt Patty does not fully understand them.

When Willa Jo and Little Sister climb up on Aunt Patty's roof to watch the sunrise, then decide not to come down for a while, Patty realizes she has not been fulfilling the girls' emotional needs. Willa Jo reflects on her time at her Aunt Patty's house.

== Characters ==
- Willa Jo: Willa Jo is thirteen years old and ends up living with her Aunt Patty after the death of her baby sister.
- Little Sister: Little Sister's real name is Jo Ann, but everyone calls her Little Sister. Little Sister is seven years old and also goes to live with Aunt Patty after the death of her baby sister. She has ceased to speak.
- Baby: Baby is the youngest child of Noreen. She drank contaminated water at a carnival, was sick through the night, and died in her mother's arms the next morning.
- Noreen: Noreen is the mother of Willa Jo, Baby, and Little Sister. After the death of her youngest daughter, her grief seems unbearable. She sends Willa Jo and Little Sister to her sister Patty's house.
- Aunt Patty: Aunt Patty is Noreen's older sister. She is controlling, and her household has many rules.
- Uncle Hob: Uncle Hob is Aunt Patty's husband. He is more calm and relaxed than his wife.

== Reviews ==
"Couloumbis' first novel wears its heart on one sleeve and its humor on the other. Together, they make a splendid fit." - Booklist, boxed review

"Willa Jo tells the tale in a nonlinear, back-and-forth fashion that not only prepares readers emotionally for her heartrending account of Baby's death but also artfully illuminates each character's depths and foibles...The author creates a cast founded on likable, real-seeming people who grow and change in response to the tragedy." - Kirkus Reviews, pointer review

== Theatrical adaptation ==
A theatrical version of Getting Near to Baby was written by Y. York and premiered by People's Light and Theatre Company (Malvern, Pennsylvania) in 2008. The play has subsequently been produced at ChildsPlay (Tempe, Arizona), Seattle Children's Theatre, and Riverwalk Theater.
