= Ferdinand Q. Morton =

American politician

- Born: 1881
- Died: 1949 (aged 67–68)
- Education: Harvard University (unfinished), Boston University School of Law (attended)
- Occupations: Political leader, Lawyer
- Known for: Leader of the United Colored Democracy (UCD); First African-American member of the New York City Civil Service Commission
- Notable work: Advocated for African-American appointments in New York City government
- Political party: Democratic
- Parent(s): Edward James Morton, Mattie Shelton Morton

Ferdinand Q. Morton (1881 – 1949) was an American political leader during the Harlem Renaissance in Harlem, New York City.

== Biography ==
Ferdinand Q. Morton's parents, Edward James Morton and Mattie Shelton Morton, were former slaves in Mississippi.

Morton attended Harvard University, though he remained half-a-credit shy of graduating due to a policy change. He attended Boston University School of Law for a year and a half. Morton began his career in politics by working on the unsuccessful presidential campaign of Democrat William Jennings Bryant. He passed the New York State Bar in 1910.

Morton joined the United Colored Democracy (UCD), a New York City African-American organization that allied with the New York City Democratic Party organization known as Tammany Hall. Morton became the leader of the UCD in 1915. In 1922, Morton was appointed to the New York City Civil Service Commission as its first African-American member; he served for 26 years. Morton used his influence to secure the appointment of several African-American judges during his career.

== See also ==
- J. Raymond Jones
