= Elizabeth Brown-Guillory =

American playwright

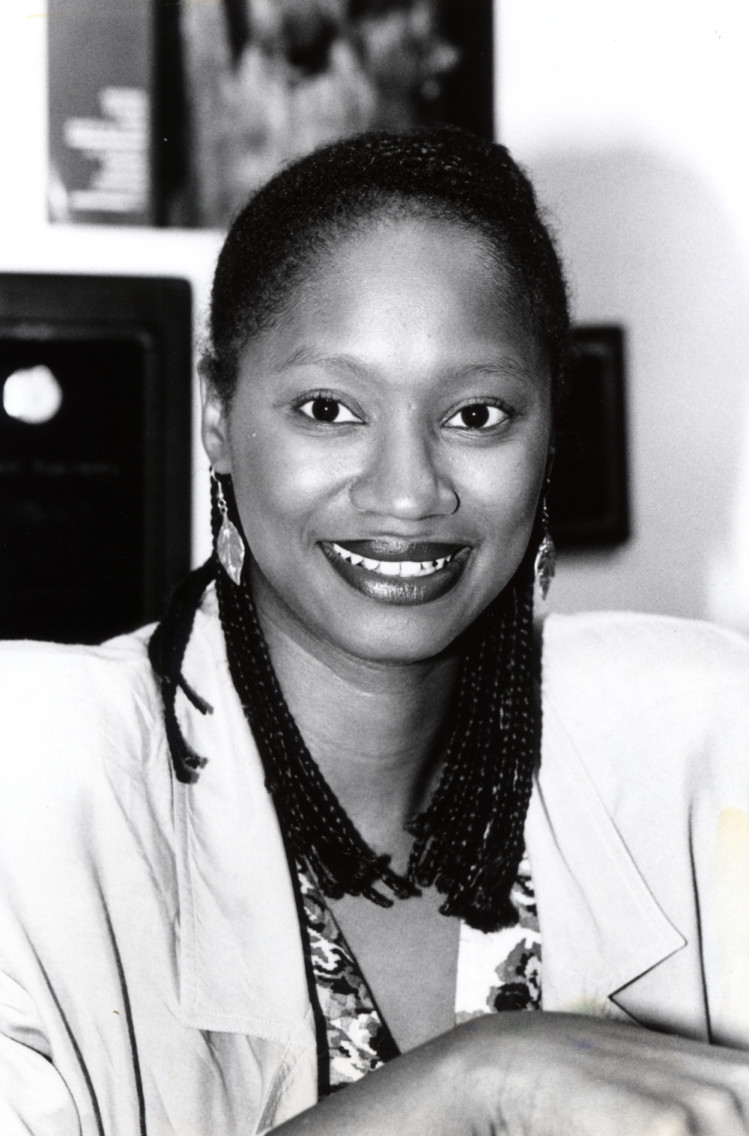
- Elizabeth Brown-Guillory

Elizabeth Brown-Guillory is an academic, playwright, and performing artist. She is a former professor of English at the University of Houston and is now the Dean of Texas Southern University's Thomas F. Freeman Honors College.

== Career ==
Brown-Guillory has had twelve plays produced in Washington D.C., New York City, Los Angeles, Denver, New Orleans, Houston, Cleveland, and Chicago. Her plays include Bayou Relics', Snapshots of Broken Dolls, Mam Phyllis, La Bakair, When the Ancestors Call, and The Break of Day. Ten of her plays have been published in Black Drama: 1850 to Present, an on-line collection of 1,200 plays by Blacks. Her book, Their Place on the Stage has been described as "a reference work important to anyone studying black women playwrights or black drama".

Brown-Guillory was formerly professor of English at the University of Houston. Since 2009 she is Distinguished Professor of Theatre at Texas Southern University in Houston, Texas.

== Books ==
- Their Place on the Stage: Black Women Playwrights in America. Westport, Connecticut: Greenwood Press, 1988. Hardcover, 165pp; New York and London: Praeger, 1990 Paperback, 165 pp; Korean translation, 2001.

== Plays published ==
- The Break of Day. In Black Theatre in Texas. Ed. Sandra Mayo and Ervin Holt. Austin: University of Texas Press. (forthcoming in 2011)
- When the Ancestors Call. In Black Theatre in Texas. Ed. Sandra Mayo and Ervin Holt. Austin: University of Texas Press. (forthcoming in 2011)
- Saving Grace. The Griot (the official journal of the Southern Conference on African American Studies, Inc.) 22.2 (Fall 2003): 47-66.
- La Bakair. The SUNO REVIEW: A Journal of the Arts and Humanities 1:2 (Spring 2001): 49-88.
- Mam Phyllis. In Wines in the Wilderness: Plays by African-American Women from the Harlem Renaissance to the Present. Ed. Elizabeth Brown-Guillory. Westport, Connecticut: Greenwood Press, 1990: 191-227.
- Snapshots of Broken Dolls. Colorado: Contemporary Drama Service, a division of Meriwether Publishing Co., 1987. 36pp.
- Bayou Relics. Colorado: Contemporary Drama Service, a division of Meriwether Publishing Co., 1983. 30 pp.
