= Raymond O'Neil =

American theatre director

Raymond O'Neil was a European-trained American theater director.

He was the critic of drama and music at The Cleveland Leader newspaper (now The Plain Dealer). To explore more innovative theatrical ideas than what was available in Cleveland at the time, O'Neil traveled to Europe to study newer forms of theatrical expression, including at the Moscow Art Theatre and the work of Max Reinhardt. After returning to Cleveland, O'Neil and his friend Henry Keller began experimenting with new theatrical techniques involving puppets, cardboard, shadows and light. The popularity of O'Neil and his shadow plays led him to become he first art director at the Cleveland Play House in 1915. However, he was not a theatre manager nor was he interested in the operation of a professional theatre company. A dreamer at heart, O'Neil resigned from the Play House in 1921 to pursue other opportunities in live theatre.

Following his resignation at the Play House, O'Neil formed a company of professional black actors in Chicago. He was inspired from seeing, "African American nightclub performers in Chicago." O'Neil persuaded several of the Lafayette Players [another little-theatre group out of New York originally called the Anita Bush Stock Company formed by Anita Bush (1883–1974)] to join him by promising them roles that were not previously available. Under O'Neil's direction the performers received, over a twelve-month period, extensive artistic training much like many European theatrical groups at the time. Raymond O'Neil was, " interest[ed] in the work of [Edward] Gordon Craig and other modernists and in the experimental techniques and motives of the Moscow Art Theatre." "He sought, not to train [the actors] in imitation of the more inhibited white actors, but to develop their particular racial characteristics-freshness and vigor of their emotional responses, their spontaneity and intense mood, their freedom from intellectual and artistic obsessions." He was interested in "experimenting with the Negro art form in the commercial theatre", and "establishing a national black theatre company.

== See also ==
- Cleveland Play House
- Ethiopian Art Theatre
