= National Ethiopian Art Theatre, Inc. =

American theatre company

National Ethiopian Art Theatre, Inc., was an American thespian company devoted to training, showcasing, and employing black American actors during the Harlem Renaissance. The company was founded by Mrs. Anne Wolter on March 17, 1924, in New York City. The Ethiopian Art Theatre School was its educational arm.

== Initial personnel ==
Corps of instructors

- Philip Loeb, director of the dramatic art department
- Albert W. Noll, director of music
- Henry Creamer, director of dancing
- George Bamman, science & technical director
