= Krigwa Players =

The Krigwa Players (also known as the Krigwa Players Little Negro Theatre and named for the acronym CRIGWA: Crisis Guild of Writers and Artists) was one of the most prominent and popular theatre groups based out of Harlem during the Harlem Renaissance. Though it only lasted for three years, The Krigwa Players' impact was felt throughout Harlem and the cities it spawned offshoot projects into, these cities being Cleveland, Baltimore, Washington, D.C., and even Philadelphia. It was founded in 1925 by W.E.B. Du Bois and Regina Anderson, with Du Bois serving as the chairman of the theater group entirely. The theatre was converted from the basement of the 135th street Harlem Library. The goal of the company was focusing on creating, nurturing, developing, and promoting new writers, directors, performers, and actors within the black community.

== Mission ==
W.E.B. Du Bois published a statement concerning the objective of the Krigwa Players in the NAACP magazine The Crisis

The plays of a real Negro theatre must be: 1. "about us." That is, they must have plays which reveal Negro life as it is. 2. "By us." That is, they must be written by Negro authors who understand from birth and continued association just what it means to be a Negro today. 3. "For us." That is, the theatre must cater primarily to Negro audiences and be supported and sustained by their entertainment and approval. 4. "Near us." The theatre must be in a Negro neighborhood near the mass of ordinary Negro peoples."

== Association with The Crisis magazine ==
Starting in 1924, Amy Spingarn (wife of Joel Elias Spingarn) established an annual literary contest in The Crisis. Accepting submissions for fiction, essays, verse, and plays, this contest became the major source of new work for the Krigwa Players.

== Productions ==
=== First season (1926) ===
The Krigwa Players' first official season was performed at the 135th Street branch of the New York Public Library in May 1926, and consisted of two one-acts plays selected as winners of the literary contest in The Crisis, The Broken Banjo by Willis Richardson and The Church Fight by Ruth Ada Gaines-Shelton, and a third one-act by Richardson "Compromise". It consistently played to full houses, with an average of 200 patrons per night. The entire production cost $165 and made back $240 in ticket sales, netting the company a modest profit.

=== Second season (1927) ===
With the second annual Crisis awards in 1926, one of the winning plays was selected to be part of the three one-acts; Eulalie Spence's Foreign Mail. The other two were a second play by Spence entitled Her and Mandy by W.J. Jefferson. This season also introduced a new interpretive dance and dialogue by J. Gord Arnold entitled Pandora's Box. Unfortunately none of the scripts for this season have survived over the years preventing analysis of the works.

=== Fifth Annual National Little Theatre Tournament (1927) ===
The company's biggest success came after entering Eulalie Spence's Fool's Errand into the Fifth Annual National Theatre Tournament. The production won the Samuel French for Best Unpublished Play and garnered the company a prize of $200. A huge success considering that this was the company's first time entering such a tournament.

== Decline and legacy ==
The company became sharply split after the tournament. W.E.B. Du Bois used the prize money to pay for the cost of the production and entering the tournament with no money going towards the performers. After this the company parted and went their separate ways. According to Eulalie Spence, the last official production of the Krigwa Players was Fool's Errand. Another group using the name Krigwa Players name emerged in 1928, but they were not affiliated with The Crisis or the original Krigwa Players. The legacy of the theater lead to subsequent groups filling the space after its closure, with some being the Negro Experimental Players (1929), the Harlem Players (1931), and the American Negro Theater, which lasted 9 years, and ran the longest out of all the former theater companies.
