= The Purple Flower =

- Original title: The Crisis
- Original language: English
- Written by: Marita Bonner
- Subject: Racial issues
- Genre: Drama

An image of the January 1928 cover of The Crisis, where the Purple Flower was first published.

The Purple Flower by Marita Bonner, is a one-act allegorical play for the racial oppression African-Americans face in the U.S. In 1927, Bonner submitted her play to a literary contest created by W.E.B. DuBois and Charles S. Johnson. The work won best one-act play and was published in January 1928 in Volume 35, Issue 1 of The Crisis, the official magazine of the National Association for the Advancement of Colored People. Bonner was born on June 16, 1899, in Boston, Massachusetts. While based in Chicago, she became an important literary figure in the Harlem Renaissance era for her short stories, plays and essays. The play's use of surrealism and European expressionism distinguishes it from other works written during this era. Its abstract set design and vague character descriptions have contributed to it never being performed in Bonner's lifetime.

== Setting and characters ==
=== Setting ===
The play takes place in "The Middle-of-Things-as-They-Are." The set is described as being split horizontally into an upper and lower section. The majority of the play happens on the upper section, while the lower section is dimly lit. At times, the upper stage actors fall through to the lower stage and "lie twisted and curled in mounds."

=== Character list and descriptions ===
- Sundry White Devils: Angel-like beings with soft hair and glowing red horns. They have tails adorned with bones to "make them seem less like tails and more like mere decorations." They are described as artful creatures skilled in intricate movement and dance.
- The Us's: The descriptions of the "Us's" are left vague. They are described as being "as white as the White Devils, as brown as the earth, as black as the center of a poppy."
  - A Little Runty Us
  - Another Us
  - Another Young Us
  - Average: The father of Sweet and Finest Blood; described as a middle-aged well-browned man
  - Cornerstone: The mother of Sweet and Finest Blood; described as a lighter-browned middle-aged woman
  - First Young Us
  - The Grass Chewer
  - The Man of the Gold Bags
  - The Middle-Aged Woman
  - The Newcomer
  - An Old Lady: An old dark brown lady
  - An Old Man
  - Young Girl
  - Young Man
  - Young Girl- Sweet: A medium light brown girl; Described as "beautiful as a browned peach"
  - The Young Man- Finest Blood: A slender, tall, bronzy brown youth who "walks with his head high"

== Plot summary ==
The play begins with the Us's resting near a brook. A song can be heard coming from the hills, as the White Devils sing to the Us's to stay where they are. The White Devils live on the side of the hill, Somewhere, while the Us's live in the valley between Somewhere and Nowhere. At the top of the hill is the purple Flower-of-Life-at-Its-Fullest. An Old Lady claims that the "Leader" told them if they work hard enough for the White Devils, they can prove themselves. The Young Us's question the point of working, since they have been in slavery for 200 years and still have not seen the flower.

A group of Us's form as they discuss how to get up the hill. Average's son and daughter, Finest Blood and Sweet, volunteer to talk to the group, while Average complains that talking will not accomplish anything. An Old Us becomes excited as A Young Man approaches with books, but the Young Man tosses them to the ground, saying that they are useless in figuring out how to defeat the White Devils since they were written by them. Sweet runs to Cornerstone crying and says that a White Devil hid in the bushes and pinched her. A Newcomer approaches with two heavy bags of gold and throws them down in front of the group. He claims that the gold is of no use to him, as he tried to pay the White Devils to go up the hill, but they would not let him.

Suddenly, an Old Lady exclaims that she had a dream about a White Devil cut into six pieces. The Old Man claims that "It's time then," and asks the Us's to bring him an iron pot. He calls on the Us's ancestors who respond that they are with the Us. The Old Man then asks for a handful of dust, books and gold which he receives and throws into the pot. Finally, he asks for red blood, but no one responds. The Old Man explains that God told him to gather the iron pot and its ingredients so that God can create a New Man. Finest Blood then volunteers to give his blood and is tasked with tricking a White Devil and fighting it to the death, for whether he wins or loses, "blood will be given." The play ends with Finest Blood disappearing into the darkness and confronting a White Devil, as the Us's wait and listen. The final stage directions read "Let the curtain close leaving all the Us's, the White Devils, Nowhere, Somewhere, listening, listening. Is it time?"

== Themes ==
=== Equality ===
The Purple Flower acts as an allegory for the racial oppression African-Americans faced in the U.S., with themes of freedom, resistance and equality appearing throughout the play. The Us's failures to reach the Purple Flower through hard work, books and gold draw parallels to African-Americans' attempts to achieve equality throughout American history.

=== Slavery and freedom ===
The play details how the Us's worked as slaves for 200 years but were never rewarded, building the White Devils' roads and houses and cultivating their fields. The Us's situation draws similarities to African-Americans during slavery, as slaves' labor were responsible for the wealth slave owners experienced.

The play's ending established a different approach towards liberation, that violence is the only way to establish change, a position that gained popularity in the post-Harlem Renaissance era.

== Critical reception ==
Even though The Purple Flower was published in a magazine, it received little critic feedback.

=== Literary context ===
The play's themes, characters and settings are unrealistic, universalized and symbolic, all features of surrealism and expressionism. The play utilized the main tenets of expressionism through its rejection of a current oppressive system, the White-Devils guarding the Purple Flower, and its call for a new system of equality, The Us's revolting at the end of the play.

=== Historical context ===
Bonner's use of European writing techniques set it apart from other works of the time. Influential Black writers like W.E.B DuBois, Alain Locke and Montgomery Gregory believed that works created by Black artists should be grounded in realism in order to combat the existing portrayal of African-Americans through media like minstrel shows. Most works written by Black authors were "Native Dramas" and fell into either of two categories: folk plays or black propaganda plays. Folk plays showcased the reality of everyday Black life in an entertaining and educating way, typically using vernacular. Black propaganda plays aimed to depict Black life as accurately as possible through showing the oppression and inequalities African-Americans faced. Dubois publicly supported black propaganda plays, stating that "all Art is propaganda and ever must be."
