= Willis Richardson =

American dramatist (1889–1977)

Willis Richardson (November 5, 1889 – November 7, 1977) was an American playwright.

== Biography ==
Willis Richardson was born on November 5, 1889, in Wilmington, North Carolina, a son of Willis Wilder and Agnes Ann (Harper) Richardson. His family moved to Washington, D.C., shortly after the Wilmington massacre of 1898.

He attended public schools in Washington, DC including M Street High School (later Dunbar High School). While attending high school there, he was encouraged to write plays by Mary P. Burrill, one of his teachers and a playwright herself. Richardson worked as a "skilled helper" in the wetting division of the Bureau of Engraving and Printing beginning on 8 March 1911.

On September 1, 1914, he married Mary Ellen Jones and they had three children:

- Jean Paula Richardson (August 7, 1916–)
- Shirley Antonella Richardson (April 29, 1918–)
- Noel Justine Richardson (August 14, 1920–)

In 1921, The Deacon's Awakening was Richardson's first play to be staged. It was presented in Saint Paul, Minnesota.

He died on November 7, 1977, in Washington, D.C. During his 30-year career, he had written children's fairy tales, histories, and domestic plays that number 48 in total.

== Plays and productions ==
After The Deacon's Awakening in 1921, Richardson's next play to be staged was The Chip Woman's Fortune, which was produced by Raymond O'Neil's Ethiopian Art Players in Chicago, Washington, D.C., and became the first non-musical production by an African American on Broadway.

His play Mortgaged was presented in 1923 by the Howard Players at Howard University. It was subsequently produced by the Dunbar Players in Plainfield, New Jersey, in 1924. The Deacon's Awakening was staged August 30-September 6, 2015 by Xoregos Performing Company in its Songs of the Harlem River program in NYC's Dream Up Festival. Songs of the Harlem River opened the Langston Hughes Festival in Queens, New York on February 13, 2016.

== The Broken Banjo ==
The characters that appear in The Broken Banjo are Emma, Matt, Sam, and Adam. The play begins with Sam, the brother of Emma, accusing Matt, Emma's husband, of murder. During the visit to Emma's house, broke Matt's banjo and enraged Matt when he returned home. In retaliation, Sam reveals that he saw Matt killing Shelton with a rock. Matt decided to locked Sam and Adam in the house until they made a pledge on the bible not to tell anyone about the murder. Emma tells Matt that they should move to another city as she didn't trust that the two would not keep their pledge. As Matt was planning to leave, Sam and Adam had brought an officer to arrest Matt.

== Honors ==
Richardson was awarded the Amy Spingarn Prize in 1925 for The Broken Banjo, his best known work. In addition, the play took first place in a contest held by The Crisis magazine in March 1925, where the play was published. First place prize was $75. The following year he received the Spingarn Prize for Bootblack Lover, a drama in three acts. He was awarded the prestigious AUDELCO prize posthumously for his contribution to American theatre.

== Personal life ==
Richardson was Catholic.

== Selected works ==
- Richardson, Willis (June 2008). Plays and Pageants from the Life of the Negro. Kessinger. ISBN 9781436685184.
- The Chip Woman's Fortune. OCLC 27409054.
- The flight of the natives. OCLC 58934982.
- Joy rider; a play. OCLC 964682451.
- The visiting lady: a comedy. OCLC 964682350.
- The broken banjo. OCLC 235941136.
- The man who married a young wife. OCLC 27417501.
- The king's dilemma, and other plays for children : Episodes of hope and dream. OCLC 881630084.
- The peacock's feathers; a play in one act. OCLC 27417513.
- A pillar of the church; a play. OCLC 27417530.
- The curse of the Shell Road Witch; a play in one act. OCLC 27409046.
- The jail bird; a play in one act. OCLC 27417481.
- Bold lover; a play. OCLC 27417415.
- The dark haven; a play. OCLC 27409041.
- The nude siren; a play. OCLC 27417506.
- The amateur prostitute; a play. OCLC 27417397.
- Victorian Poems. OCLC 28123722.
- Imp of the devil; a play. OCLC 27417465.
- The brown boy; a play. OCLC 27417450.
- Rooms for rent; a play in one act. OCLC 27417545.
