= List of African-American writers =

This is a list of Black American authors and writers, all of whom are considered part of African-American literature, and who already have Wikipedia articles. The list also includes non-American authors resident in the US and American writers of African descent.

== A ==
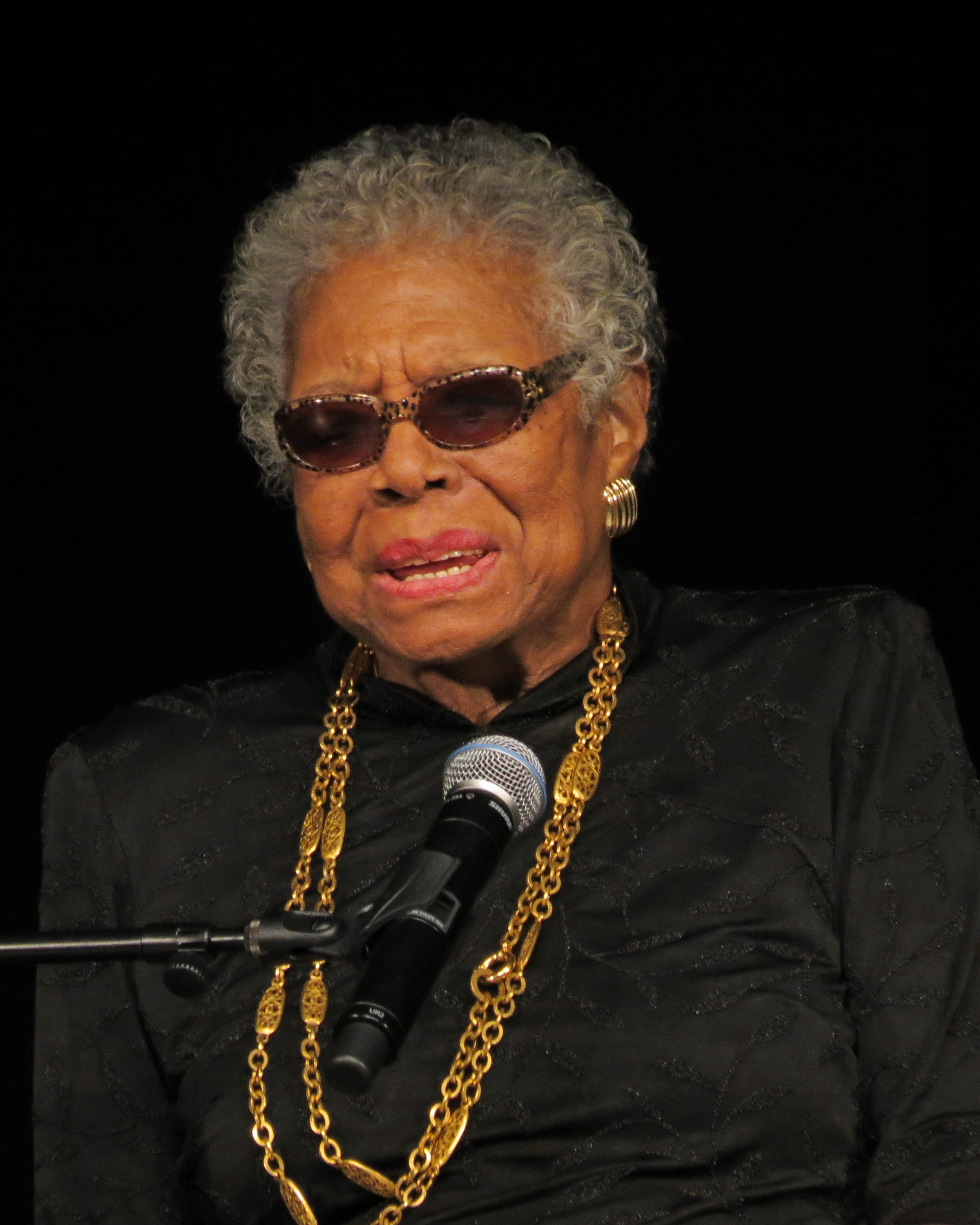
Maya Angelou

- Aberjhani (born 1957), historian, columnist, novelist, poet, artist and editor
- Mumia Abu-Jamal (born 1954), political activist and journalist
- Linda Addison (born 1952), author and poet
- Tomi Adeyemi (born 1993), author and creative writing coach
- Ai, aka Ai Ogawa, birth name Florence Anthony (1947–2010), poet, NBA for poetry, 1999
- Rochelle Alers (born 1943), author and artist
- Elizabeth Alexander (born 1962), poet, essayist and playwright
- Kwame Alexander (born 1968), writer of poetry and children's fiction
- Larry D. Alexander (born 1953), author and artist
- Lewis Grandison Alexander (1898–1945), poet, actor and playwright
- Candace Allen (born 1950), novelist, cultural critic, and screenwriter
- Clarissa Minnie Thompson Allen (1859–1941), author and educator
- Robert L. Allen (1942–2024), activist, writer and academic
- Garland Anderson (1886–1939), playwright
- Monroe Anderson (born 1947) journalist, author, was Chicago's press secretary for mayor Eugene Sawyer
- Maya Angelou (1928–2014), author and poet
- Tina McElroy Ansa (1949–2024), novelist, filmmaker, teacher and journalist
- Ray Aranha (1939–2011), actor, playwright and stage director
- Chalmers Archer (1928–2014), author, veteran and educator
- M. K. Asante Jr. (born 1982), author, poet, screenwriter, professor
- Jabari Asim (born 1962), poet, playwright, professor
- Russell Atkins (1926–2024), musician, playwright and poet
- William Attaway (1911–1986), novelist, short-story writer, essayist, songwriter, playwright and screenwriter

== B ==
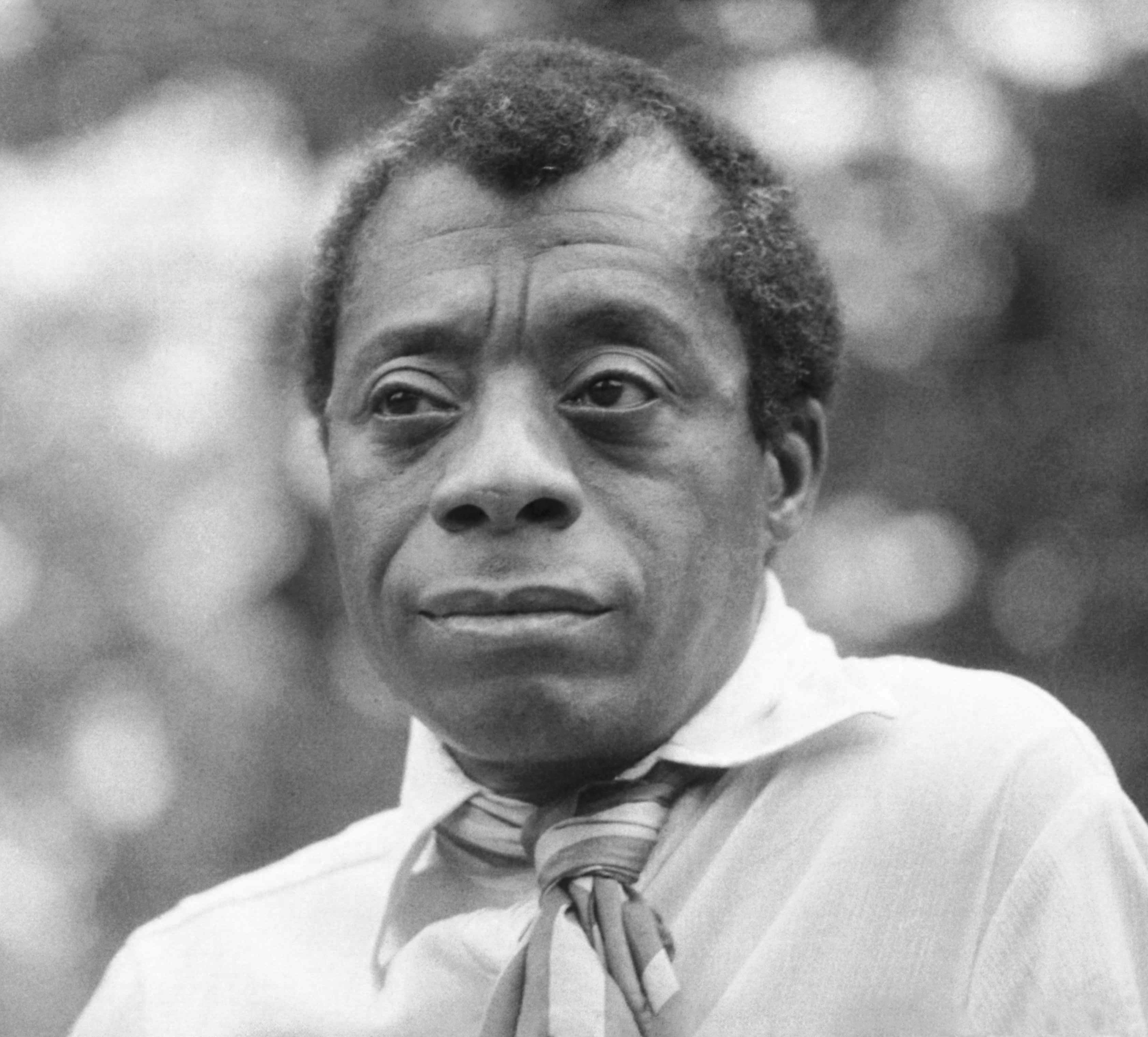
James Baldwin

- Calvin Baker (born 1972), novelist
- Nikki Baker, aka Jennifer Dowdell (born 1962), novelist
- James Baldwin (1924–1987), novelist, playwright, essayist, poet and activist
- Toni Cade Bambara (1939–1995), author, filmmaker and activist
- Leslie Esdaile Banks (1959–2011)
- Amiri Baraka (1934–2014), writer of poetry, drama, fiction, essays, and music criticism
- Aja Barber (living), fashion activist and writer
- Shauna Barbosa (born c. 1988), poet
- Steven Barnes (born 1952)
- Amy DuBois Barnett (born 1969)
- Lindon W. Barrett (1961–2008)
- Samuel Alfred Beadle (1857–1932)
- Paul Beatty (born 1962)
- Robert Beck (1918–1992)
- Christopher C. Bell (born 1933)
- Derrick Bell (1930–2011)
- Brit Bennett (living), novelist
- Gwendolyn Bennett (1902–1981)
- Hal Bennett (1936–2004), novelist
- Lerone Bennett Jr. (1928–2018)
- Bertice Berry (born 1960)
- Venise T. Berry (born 1955), novelist
- Henry Bibb (1815–1854)
- Uché Blackstock (born 1977 or 1978), physician, professor, and author
- Eleanor Taylor Bland (1944–2010), writer of crime fiction
- Marita Bonner (1899–1971), essayist and playwright
- Arna Bontemps (1902–1973), poet, novelist and librarian
- James Boggs (1919–1993)
- Hannah Crafts (born c. 1830s)
- Demico Boothe (living), writer on civil rights
- David Bradley (born 1950)
- William Stanley Braithwaite (1878–1962), poet and literary critic
- Gwendolyn Brooks (1917–2000)
- Claude Brown (1937–2002)
- Hallie Quinn Brown (1849–1949)
- Roseanne A. Brown (born 1995), writer of fantasy, science fiction and young adult fiction
- Sterling A. Brown (1901–1989), poet, literary critic, professor, poet laureate of the District of Columbia
- William Wells Brown (1814–1884), wrote first novel published by an African American, Clotel (1853)
- Anatole Broyard (1920–1990)
- Ashley Bryan (1923–2022)
- Niobia Bryant (born 1972), author of romance and mainstream fiction novels
- Ed Bullins (1935–2021)
- Olivia Ward Bush (1869–1944)
- Octavia Butler (1947–2006)
- Roderick D. Bush (1945–2013), sociologist, activist and author

== C ==
- George Cain (1943–2010), novelist
- Bebe Moore Campbell (1950–2006), author, journalist and teacher
- Clay Cane, journalist, author, political commentator, and radio host
- Stokely Carmichael (1941–1998)
- Ben Carson (born 1951)
- Jennie Carter (1830–1881), journalist and essayist
- Stephen L. Carter (born 1954), legal scholar
- Cyrus Cassells (born 1957), poet and professor
- Kashana Cauley (living), comedy writer and novelist
- Lady Chablis (1957–2016), actress, author, drag performer
- Charles W. Chesnutt (1858–1932), novelist and short-story writer
- Alice Childress (1916–1994), playwright and novelist
- Paulette Childress (born 1948), poet and short story writer
- P. Djèlí Clark, aka Dexter Gabriel or Phenderson Djèlí Clark (born 1971), author and historian
- Breena Clarke (living)
- Cheril N. Clarke (born 1980)
- Cheryl Clarke (born 1947)
- John Henrik Clarke (1915–1998)
- Stanley Bennett Clay (born 1950), writer, director, actor, publisher
- Troy CLE (living), fiction writer
- Pearl Cleage (born 1948), playwright, essayist, novelist, poet, and activist
- Eldridge Cleaver (1935–1998)
- Michelle Cliff (1946–2016), novelist
- Lucille Clifton (1936–2010), poet and educator
- Wendy Coakley-Thompson (born 1966)
- Ta-Nehisi Coates (born 1975), author, journalist, and activist
- Wanda Coleman (1946–2013), poet
- Marvel Cooke (1903–2000), journalist, writer and civil rights activist
- Anna J. Cooper (1858–1964)
- Clarence Cooper Jr. (1934–1978), novelist
- J. California Cooper (1931–2014), playwright and author
- James Corrothers (1869–1917), poet and journalist
- Jayne Cortez (1934–2012), poet and activist
- Bill Cosby (born 1937)
- S.A. Cosby (born 1973), author
- Joseph Seamon Cotter Sr. (1861–1949)
- Donald Crews (born 1938), children's book author
- Stanley Crouch (1945–2020), poet, critic, columnist, novelist and biographer
- Harold Cruse (1916–2005), academic and social critic
- Countee Cullen (1903–1946), poet, novelist, children's writer and playwright
- Waring Cuney (1906–1976), poet
- Christopher Paul Curtis (born 1953), children's book author

== D ==
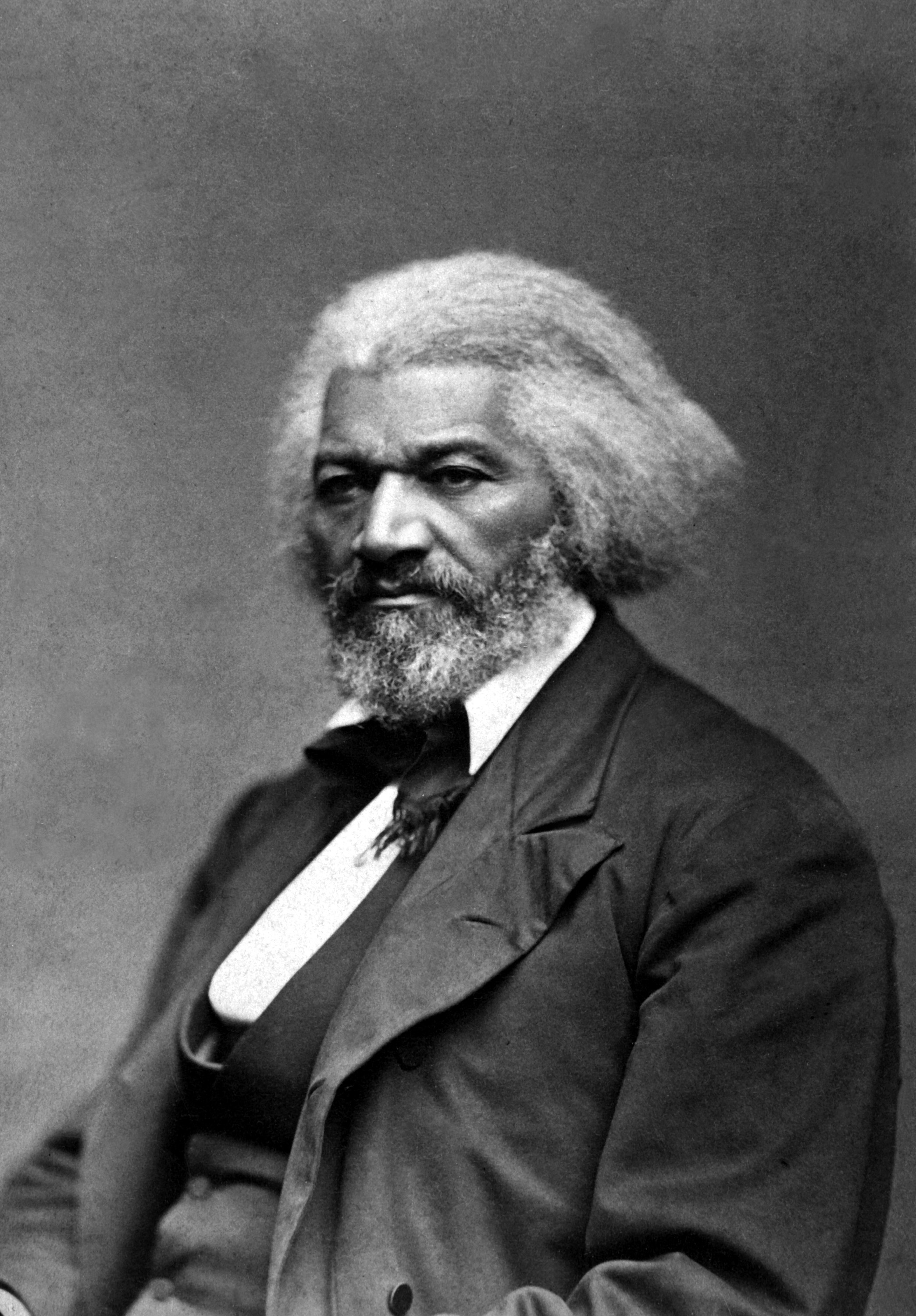
Frederick Douglass

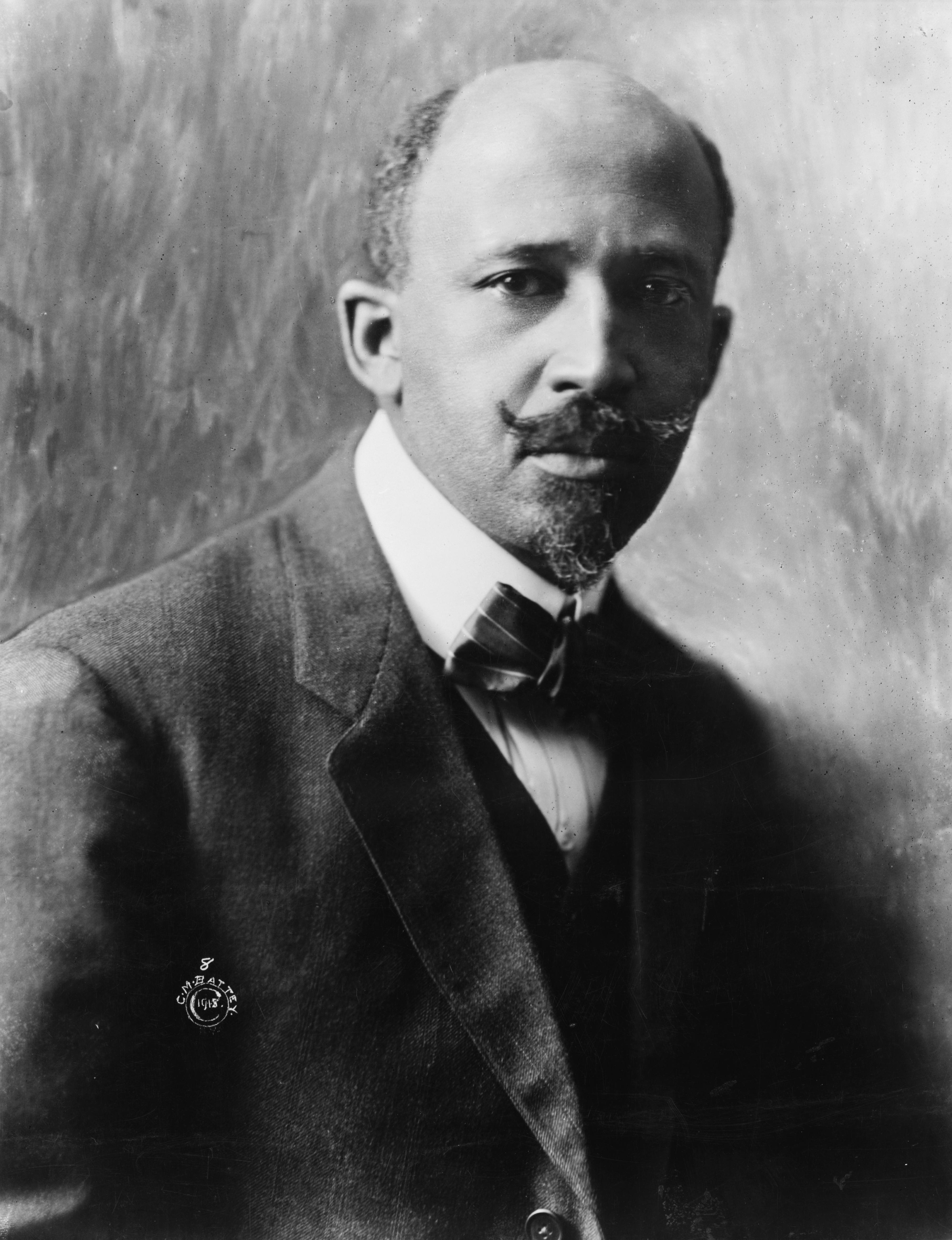
W. E. B. Du Bois

- Jeffrey Daniels (living), poet
- Meri Nana-Ama Danquah (born 1967)
- Christopher Darden (born 1956)
- Angela Davis (born 1944) political activist, writer, and professor
- Frank Marshall Davis (1905–1987)
- Milton Davis (living)
- George Dawson (1898–2001)
- Samuel R. Delany, novelist, author, editor, professor, and literary critic
- Tracy Deonn
- Eric Jerome Dickey (1961–2021)
- Anita Doreen Diggs (born 1966)
- Nahshon Dion (born 1978) creative non-fiction writer
- Lonnie Dixon (1932–2011)
- Frederick Douglass (1818–1895)
- Rita Dove (born 1952), poet and educator. Youngest person and first Black American to be the U.S. Poet Laureate and Consultant in Poetry at the Library of Congress.
- Sharon Draper (born 1948)
- W. E. B. Du Bois (1868–1963) writer, sociologist, and activist, who was a founding member of the NAACP His most notable work is The Souls of Black Folk.
- Tananarive Due (born 1966) writer specializing in Black speculative fiction, and professor of Black Horror and Afrofuturism
- Henry Dumas (1934–1968)
- Paul Laurence Dunbar (1872–1906), poet
- Alice Dunbar-Nelson (1875–1935)
- David Anthony Durham (born 1969)
- Richard Durham, (1917–1984), wrote radio series Destination Freedom
- Michael Eric Dyson (born 1958)

== E ==
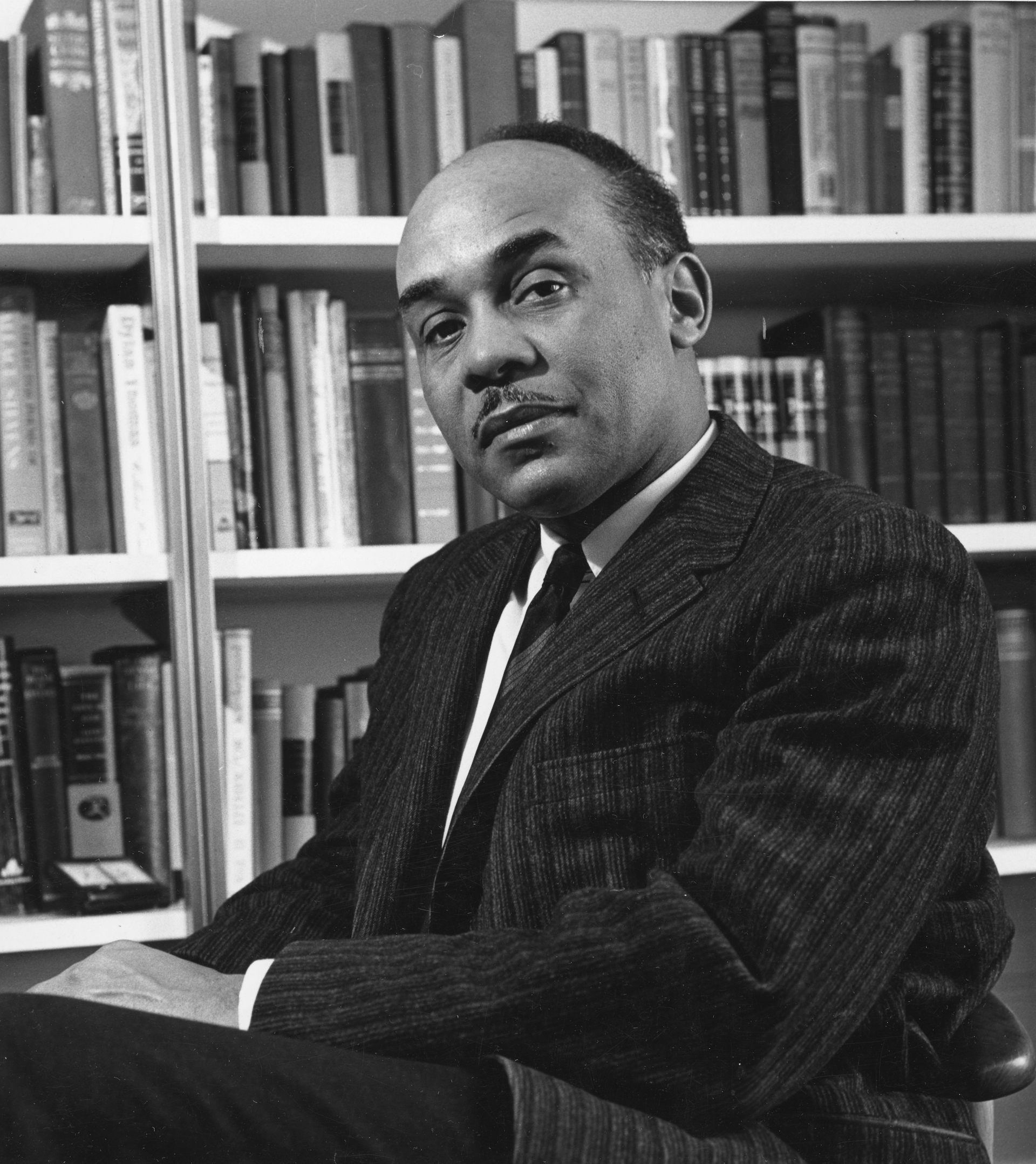
Ralph Ellison

- Cornelius Eady (born 1954)
- Sarah Jane Woodson Early (1825–1907), educator, activist and author
- Junius Edwards (1929–2008)
- Ralph Ellison (1913–1994), novelist, best known as author of Invisible Man
- Olaudah Equiano (c. 1745–1797)
- Don Evans (1938–2003), playwright
- Mari Evans (1919–2017), poet
- Percival Everett (born 1956), novelist
- Eve Ewing (born 1986), author, educator, poet, and sociologist

== F ==
- Sarah Webster Fabio (1928–1979)
- Ronald Fair (1932–2018)
- Sarah Farro, 19th-century novelist
- John M. Faucette (1943–2003), science-fiction author
- Arthur Huff Fauset (1899–1983)
- Jessie Fauset (1882–1961), editor, poet, essayist and novelist
- London R. Ferebee (1849–1883), preacher and author
- Lolita Files (living), author, screenwriter and producer
- Antwone Fisher (born 1959)
- Rudolph Fisher (1897–1934), novelist, short story writer and dramatist
- Sharon G. Flake (born 1955), writer of young adult literature
- Robert Fleming (living), journalist and writer of erotic fiction and horror fiction
- Angela Flournoy, author
- Mary Weston Fordham (c. 1862–1905), poet
- Namina Forna (born 1987), author and screenwriter
- Leon Forrest (1937–1997), novelist
- Tonya Foster (born 1966), poet, essayist and educator
- J. E. Franklin (born 1937), playwright
- John Hope Franklin (1915–2009), historian, sociologist, memoirist
- Hoyt W. Fuller (1923–1981)
- Nina Foxx (living), novelist, playwright and screenwriter

== G ==
- Ernest Gaines (1933–2019), fiction writer
- Ruth Gaines-Shelton (1872–1938), educator and playwright
- Marcus Garvey (1887–1940)
- Tony Gaskins (born 1984), motivational, inspirational, self-help writer
- Henry Louis Gates Jr. (born 1950)
- Roxane Gay (born 1974)
- Nikki Giovanni (1943–2024)
- Roy Glenn (1914–1971), fiction writer, Is It A Crime, Payback
- Donald Goines (1936–1974)
- Marita Golden (born 1950)
- Edythe Mae Gordon (c. 1897–1980), poet, fiction writer
- Eugene Gordon (1891–1972), journalist
- Charles Gordone (1925–1995), playwright
- Amanda Gorman (born 1998), poet
- Lawrence Otis Graham (born 1962)
- Moses Grandy (born c. 1786)
- Ayana Gray (born 1993)
- Victor Hugo Green (1892–1960), travel writer
- Eloise Greenfield (1929–2021), children's book author
- Sam Greenlee (1930–2014), novelist, poet, best known as author of The Spook Who Sat by the Door
- Bonnie Greer (1948–2026), novelist, playwright, critic
- Deborah Gregory, author of The Cheetah Girls book series
- Dick Gregory (1932–2017)
- Sutton E. Griggs (1872–1933)
- Nikki Grimes (born 1950), children's book author and poet
- Angelina Weld Grimke (1880–1958)
- Charlotte Forten Grimké (1837–1914)
- Rosa Guy (1922–2012)
- John Langston Gwaltney (1928–1998), anthropologist, author of Drylongso
- Yaa Gyasi (born 1989), Ghanaian-American novelist, author of Homegoing.

== H ==
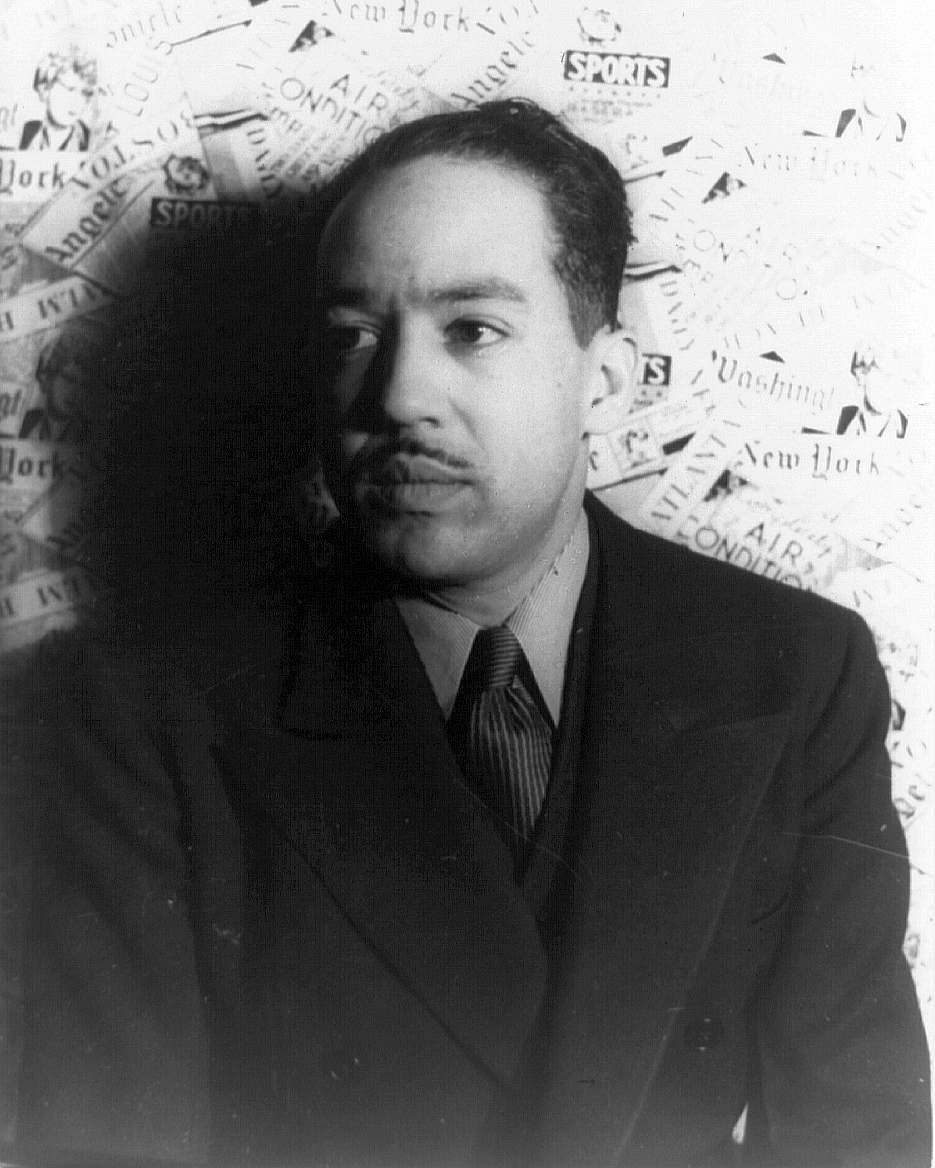
Langston Hughes

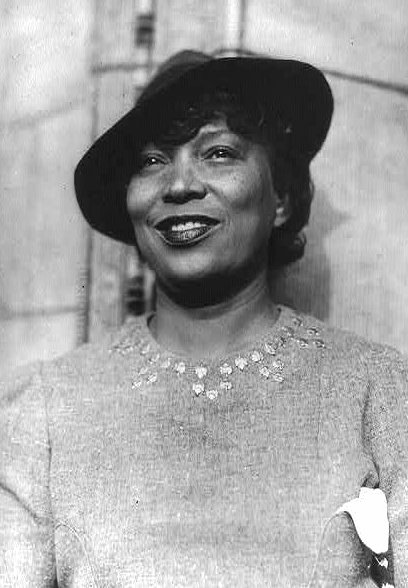
Zora Neale Hurston

- Alex Haley (1921–1992), author of Roots: The Saga of an American Family
- Virginia Hamilton (1934–2002), author of children's books
- Henry Hampton (1940–1998)
- Lorraine Hansberry (1930–1965), playwright
- Joyce Hansen (born 1942), author of children's books
- Vincent Harding (1931–2014), historian and social activist
- Edward W. Hardy (born 1992), playwright
- Nathan Hare (1933–2024), sociologist, activist, academic and psychologist
- Frances Harper (1825–1911), poet and abolitionist
- E. Lynn Harris (1955–2009)
- Juanita Harrison (1891–?)
- Saidiya Hartman (born 1961) writer and academic, known for her seminal work Scenes of Subjection
- Robert Hayden (1913–1980), poet, essayist, educator
- Cheryl A. Head, author and organizer
- Essex Hemphill (1957–1995), poet and activist
- David Henderson (poet) (born 1942)
- Safiya Henderson-Holmes (1950–2001), poet
- Donna Hill
- Chester Himes (1909–1984), novelist
- Kameisha Jerae Hodge (born 1989), poet and publisher
- Corey J. Hodges (born 1970)
- Karla F. C. Holloway (born 1949)
- bell hooks (1952–2021), feminist, and social activist
- Pauline Hopkins (1859–1930), novelist, journalist, playwright, historian and editor
- Nalo Hopkinson (born 1960), Jamaican Canadian, currently based in California
- George Moses Horton (1798–after 1867)
- Roberta Hoskie, real-estate broker, writer, and media personality
- Tracie Howard, fiction writer
- Detrick Hughes (born 1966), poet
- Langston Hughes (1901–1967), poet, social activist, novelist, playwright and columnist
- Zora Neale Hurston (1891–1960), folklorist, anthropologist, author of novels short stories, plays and essays

== I ==
- Jordan Ifueko (born 1993)
- Rashidah Ismaili (born 1941), poet, fiction writer, essayist and playwright

== J ==
- Brenda Jackson (born 1953)
- Jesse C. Jackson (1908–1983), young-adult novelist
- Mae Jackson (born 1946), poet
- Harriet Jacobs (1813 or 1815–1897), author of Incidents in the Life of a Slave Girl (1861)
- T. D. Jakes (born 1957)
- Ayize Jama-Everett (born 1974), science fiction and speculative fiction writer
- John Jea (1773–after 1817)
- N. K. Jemisin (born 1972), writer of speculative fiction. First person to win three consecutive Hugo Awards for Best Novel.
- Beverly Jenkins (born 1951)
- Joseph Jewell (living)
- Terri L. Jewell (1954–1995), poet, writer and Black lesbian activist
- Alaya Dawn Johnson (born 1982)
- Angela Johnson (born 1961)
- Charles R. Johnson (born 1948)
- Georgia Douglas Johnson (1880–1966), poet
- Helene Johnson (1906–1995), poet
- James Weldon Johnson (1871–1938), writer and civil rights activist
- Mat Johnson (born 1970), fiction writer
- Varian Johnson (born 1977)
- Edward P. Jones (born 1950), novelist and short-story writer
- Gayl Jones (born 1949), novelist
- Tayari Jones (born 1970), author and academic
- June Jordan (1936–2002), poet, essayist and activist

== K ==
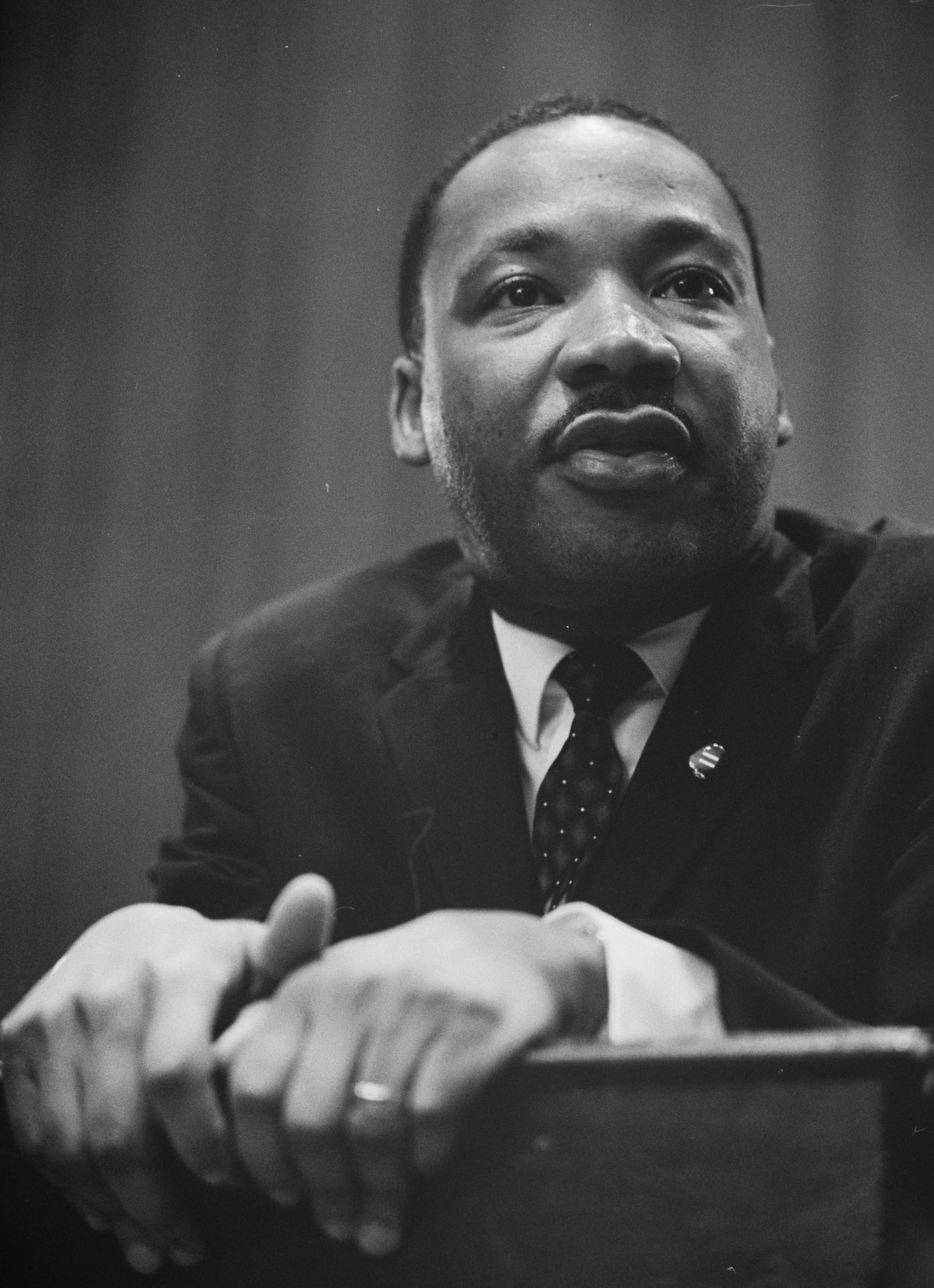
Martin Luther King Jr.

- Ron Karenga (born 1941)
- Bob Kaufman (1925–1986), poet
- Elizabeth Keckley (1818–1907)
- William Melvin Kelley (1937–2017), novelist
- Emma Dunham Kelley-Hawkins (1863–1938), novelist
- Randall Kenan (1963–2020)
- Adrienne Kennedy (born 1931), playwright
- Nina Kennedy (born 1960), memoirist, screenwriter
- John Oliver Killens (1916–1987), novelist
- Jamaica Kincaid (born 1949), novelist and essayist
- Emeline King (born 1957)
- Martin Luther King Jr. (1929–1968)
- Woodie King Jr. (born 1937)
- Etheridge Knight (1931–1991), poet
- Yusef Komunyakaa (born 1941)

== L ==
- Pinkie Gordon Lane (1923–2008), poet, editor and teacher
- Nella Larsen (1891–1964), novelist
- Victor LaValle (born 1972), fiction writer
- Brent Leggs (born 1972), historian and preservationist, writer, academic
- Andrea Lee (born 1953), novelist and memoirist
- Julius Lester (1939–2018), writer and academic
- David Levering Lewis (born 1936), historian
- Willie Little (born 1961) author, multimedia artist
- Alain Locke (1885–1954) writer
- Attica Locke (born 1974), novelist
- Audre Lorde (1934–1992), author, poet, activist
- Bettina L. Love (living), abolitionist educator and writer
- Glenville Lovell (born 1955), novelist and playwright
- Kyra Davis Lurie (born 1972), novelist

== M ==
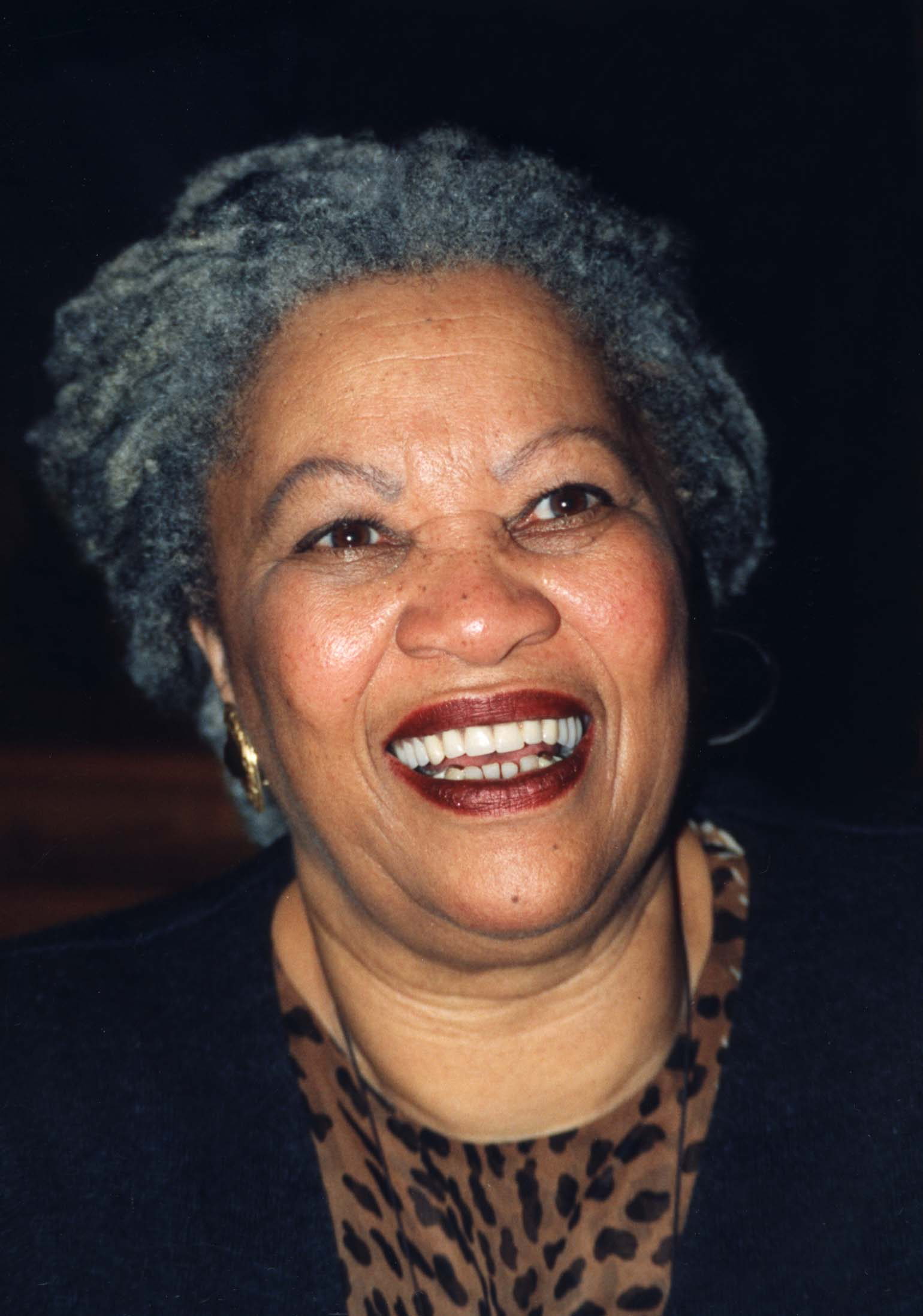
Toni Morrison

- Christopher Mwashinga (born 1965), poet, theologian, essayist
- Nathaniel Mackey (born 1947), poet, novelist, anthologist, literary critic and editor
- Naomi Long Madgett (1923–2020), poet
- Haki R. Madhubuti (born 1942), author, educator, poet, and publisher
- Clarence Major (born 1936), poet, painter and novelist
- Raynetta Manees (living), novelist
- Manning Marable (1950–2011)
- John Marrant (1755–1791)
- Paule Marshall (1929–2019)
- Ora Mae Lewis Martin (1889–1977), journalist and writer
- Hans Massaquoi (1926–2013)
- Brandon Massey (born 1973)
- Victoria Earle Matthews (1861–1907), essayist, newspaperwoman, activist
- Julian Mayfield (1928–1984)
- James McBride (writer) (born 1957)
- Nathan McCall (born 1955)
- Bernice McFadden (born 1965), novelist
- Claude McKay (1889–1948)
- Mia McKenzie, author and activist
- Patricia McKissack (1944–2017)
- Reginald McKnight (born 1956)
- Kim McLarin (born 1964), novelist
- Terry McMillan (born 1951), novelist
- James Alan McPherson (1943–2016)
- Louise Meriwether (1923–2023), novelist, essayist, journalist and activist
- Oscar Micheaux (1884–1951)
- Penny Mickelbury (born 1948), playwright, short story writer, and novelist
- E. Ethelbert Miller (born 1950), poet
- May Miller (1899–1995), poet and playwright
- Arthenia J. Bates Millican (1920–2012), poet, essayist and educator
- Mary Monroe (living), novelist
- Anne Moody (1940–2015)
- Jessica Care Moore (born 1971), poet
- Toni Morrison (1931–2019), author, Nobel laureate 1993
- Bethany C. Morrow, author
- E. Frederic Morrow (c.1909–1994), first black American appointed to a president's administration (1955–60)
- Walter Mosley (born 1952), novelist
- Thylias Moss (born 1954), poet, filmmaker and playwright
- Willard Motley (1909–1965)
- Jason Mott, novelist and poet
- Leila Mottley (born 2002), novelist and poet
- Jess Mowry (born 1960)
- Albert Murray (1916–2013)
- Pauli Murray (1910–1985), civil rights activist, legal scholar, and author
- Walter Dean Myers (1937–2014), writer of children's books

== N ==
- Tariq Nasheed (living)
- Gloria Naylor (1950–2016), novelist
- Larry Neal (1937–1981)
- Barbara Neely (1941–2020), novelist, short-story writer and activist
- Huey P. Newton (1942–1989)
- Richard Bruce Nugent (1906–1987)

== O ==
- Mwatabu S. Okantah (born 1952) poet and professor
- Gabriel Okara (1921–2019), poet and novelist
- Nnedi Okorafor (born 1974), writer of science fiction and fantasy
- Marc Olden (1933–2003), author of mystery and suspense
- Porsha Olayiwola (born 1988), poet
- Rita Omokha (living), journalist and author
- Terry a. O'Neal (born 1973), poet, novelist, screenwriter, columnist, and educator
- Tochi Onyebuchi (born 1987), science fiction and fantasy writer and former civil rights lawyer
- Roscoe Orman (born 1944)
- Ewuare Osayande (living)
- Brenda Marie Osbey (born 1957), poet
- Candace Owens (born 1989), political activist

== P ==
- ZZ Packer (born 1973), writer of short fiction
- Gordon Parks (1912–2006), photographer, composer, author, poet, and film director
- Suzan-Lori Parks (born 1963), playwright, screenwriter, musician and novelist
- Tyler Perry (born 1969), actor, filmmaker and playwright
- Eric Pete (living), novelist and short-story writer
- Ann Petry (1908–1997), writer of novels, short stories, children's books and journalism
- Delores Phillips (1950–2014), poet and novelist
- Gary Phillips (writer) (born 1955), writer, editor, and community activist
- Steve Phillips (born 1964), author, columnist, political thought leader
- Deesha Philyaw (born 1971), author, columnist, and public speaker
- William Pickens (1881–1954), orator, educator, journalist, and essayist
- Leonard Pitts (born 1957), novelist, commentator, journalist, and columnist
- Ann Plato (c. 1824–unknown), educator and author
- Sterling Plumpp (born 1940), educator and author
- Carlene Hatcher Polite (1932–2009)
- Alvin F. Poussaint (1934–2025), author, psychiatrist, and academic
- Jewel Prestage (1931–2014), first African-American woman to earn a Ph.D. in political science, former Dean of the School of Public Policy and Urban Affairs at Southern University
- Robert Earl Price (1942–2025), playwright and poet

== R ==
- Emily Raboteau (born 1976), fiction writer, essayist, and professor of creative writing
- Aishah Rahman (1936–2014), playwright
- Alice Randall (born 1959), author and songwriter
- Dudley Randall (1914–2000), poet and publisher
- Cordelia Ray (1852–1916), poet and teacher
- Francis Ray (1944–2013), writer of romance fiction
- Andy Razaf (1895–1973), poet, composer and lyricist
- Ishmael Reed (born 1938), poet, essayist and novelist
- Kiley Reid (born 1987), novelist
- Jason Reynolds (born 1983), YA/Middle-Grade novelist/poet
- Willis Richardson (1889–1977), playwright
- Florida Ruffin Ridley (1861–1943), essayist and short-story writer
- Vanessa Riley, novelist
- Harrison David Rivers (born 1981), playwright
- Cliff Roquemore (1948–2002), writer, producer and director
- Carolyn Rodgers (1940–2010), poet
- Octavia V. Rogers Albert (1853–c. 1890)
- Al Roker (born 1954), journalist and author
- Fran Ross (1935–1985), novelist
- Shawn Stewart Ruff (born 1959), novelist
- Josephine St. Pierre Ruffin (1842–1924), journalist
- Malinda Russell (c. 1812–?), author of the first known cookbook by a Black woman in the United States
- Rachel Renee Russell (born 1959), author of the Dork Diaries series of children's novels
- Carl Hancock Rux, poet, essayist, playwright, novelist
- Rupaul (born 1960), actor, author, drag performer, TV show host
- Kennedy Ryan, novelist

== S ==
- Kalamu ya Salaam (born 1947), poet, author, filmmaker, teacher, activist
- Sonia Sanchez (born 1934), poet
- Dori Sanders (born 1934) novelist
- Sapphire (born 1950)
- Charles R. Saunders (1946–2020), author and journalist
- Arturo Alfonso Schomburg (1874–1938), historian, writer, and activist
- George Schuyler (1895–1977), author, journalist and social commentator
- Gil Scott-Heron (1949–2011), poet and musician
- Clara Johnson Scroggins (1931–2019), author, collector
- Sandra Seaton (living), playwright and librettist
- Victor Séjour (1817–1874)
- Fatima Shaik (living), author
- Tupac Shakur (1971–1996)
- Ntozake Shange (1948–2018), playwright and poet
- Nisi Shawl (born 1955)
- Sister Souljah (born 1964)
- Iceberg Slim (1918–1992)
- Amanda Smith (1837–1915)
- Danez Smith (living), poet
- Effie Waller Smith (1879–1960), poet
- William Gardner Smith (1927–1974), journalist, novelist, and editor
- Thomas Sowell (born 1930), economist, social theorist, political philosopher
- A. B. Spellman (born 1935)
- Anne Spencer (1882–1975), poet
- Aurin Squire (born 1979), producer, playwright, screenwriter and reporter
- Theophilus Gould Steward (1843–1924)
- Maria W. Stewart (1803–1879), journalist, lecturer, abolitionist, women's rights activist
- Jeffrey C. Stewart (born 1950), professor and Pulitzer prize winner
- Nic Stone (born 1985)

== T ==
- Ellen Tarry (1906–2008), journalist and author
- Nedra Glover Tawwab, mental health therapist, social worker, and author
- Brandon Taylor (born 1989)
- Mildred D. Taylor (born 1943)
- Susie Taylor (1848–1912)
- Mary Church Terrell (1863–1954)
- Lucy Terry (c. 1730–1821)
- Michael Thelwell (born 1939), novelist and essayist
- Angie Thomas (born 1988), young adult author
- Clarence Thomas (born 1948)
- Joyce Carol Thomas (1938–2016), author, poet, playwright, and motivational speaker
- Lorenzo Thomas (1944–2005)
- Piri Thomas (1928–2011), writer and poet
- Sheree Thomas (born 1972), writer, book editor, and publisher
- Truth Thomas (living), poet
- Pamela Thomas-Graham (born 1963)
- Era Bell Thompson (1905–1986)
- Howard Thurman (1899–1981)
- Wallace Thurman (1902–1934)
- Ruth D. Todd (1878–?)
- Lynn Toler (born 1959)
- Melvin B. Tolson (1898–1966)
- Jean Toomer (1894–1967)
- Touré (born 1971), journalist
- Askia M. Touré (born 1938), poet, essayist, leading voice of the Black Arts Movement
- Quincy Troupe (born 1939)
- Sojourner Truth (c.1797–1883)
- Omar Tyree (born 1969), novelist
- Neil deGrasse Tyson (born 1958)

== V ==
- Henry Van Dyke (1928–2011), novelist, editor, teacher and musician
- Ivan Van Sertima (1935–2009), professor, author, historian, linguist and anthropologist at Rutgers University
- Bethany Veney (c. 1813–1916), author of Aunt Betty's Story: The Narrative of Bethany Veney, A Slave Woman (1889)
- Olympia Vernon (born 1973), novelist

== W ==
- Alice Walker (born 1944)
- Frank X. Walker (born 1961), founding member of Affrilachian poets
- Margaret Walker (1915–1998), novelist, poet and writer
- Michele Wallace (born 1952)
- Eric Walrond (1898–1966)
- Mildred Pitts Walter (1922–2026)
- Marilyn Nelson Waniek (born 1946)
- Douglas Turner Ward (1930–2021)
- Jesmyn Ward (born 1977), novelist
- Booker T. Washington (1856–1915)
- Bryan Washington (born 1993), author
- Frank J. Webb (1828–c.1894), novelist, poet, essayist
- Carl Weber (born 1964), author, publisher, television writer, and producer
- Ida B. Wells (1862–1931)
- Richard Wesley (born 1945), playwright, screenwriter
- Valerie Wilson Wesley (born 1947)
- Cornel West (born 1953)
- Dorothy West (1907–1998), novelist
- Phillis Wheatley (1753–1784), first published African-American poet
- Walter Francis White (1893–1955)
- Colson Whitehead (born 1969), novelist (The Intuitionist, The Underground Railroad) and journalist
- Steven Whitehurst (born 1967), award-winning author
- Albery Allson Whitman (1851–1901), poet, minister and orator
- Anthony Whyte, writer of urban and hip-hop literature
- John Edgar Wideman (born 1941)
- Charmaine Wilkerson, journalist, writer, and author
- Isabel Wilkerson (born 1961), journalist and author
- Crystal Wilkinson (living)
- Alicia D. Williams (born 1970), children's novelist
- Chancellor Williams (1893–1992), historian and sociologist
- John Alfred Williams (1925–2015), author, journalist and academic
- Samm-Art Williams (1946–2024), playwright
- Sherley Anne Williams (1944–1999)
- Walter E. Williams (1936–2020)
- August Wilson (1945–2005), playwright
- Harriet E. Wilson (1825–1900), author of Our Nig and the first African-American novelist
- Kathy Y. Wilson (died 2022), journalist, columnist, playwright, and commentator
- William Julius Wilson (born 1935), author of When Work Disappears, The Truly Disadvantaged, and The Declining Significance of Race
- Oprah Winfrey (born 1954), talk-show host, actress, author and media proprietor
- Carter G. Woodson (1875–1950), historian, author and journalist
- Jacqueline Woodson (born 1963), award-winning author of books for children and adolescents, including "Brown Girl Dreaming"
- David Wright (born 1964)
- Jay Wright (born 1934), poet
- Kelly Wright, author of Outed Obsession and Fatal Fixation
- Richard Wright (1908–1960), writer of novels, short stories, poems and non-fiction
- Sarah E. Wright (1928–2009), novelist
- David F. Walker, comic book writer and novelist

== X ==
- Malcolm X (1925–1965)
- Marian X (born 1944), playwright

== Y ==
- Camille Yarbrough (born 1938)
- Frank Yerby (1916–1991), historical novelist
- Al Young (1939–2021), poet, novelist, essayist, screenwriter and professor

== Z ==
- Zane (born 1966/67), author of erotic fiction
- Ahmos Zu-Bolton (1948–2005), activist, poet and playwright

== See also ==
- List of African-American nonfiction writers
- African-American literature
- Lists of writers
- Multi-Ethnic Literature of the United States
- Before Columbus Foundation
- List of Mexican-American writers
