= List of African-American non-fiction writers =

This is a list of African American nonfiction writers who are notable enough to be, or are likely to be, the subject of Wikipedia articles and who are largely known for their books or writing:

(See also)

== A ==
- Larry Dell Alexander (born 1953), visual artist, author of commentaries on Christianity
- Chalmers Archer (1928–2014)

== B ==
- Christopher C. Bell (born 1933)

== C ==
- Jennie Carter (1830–1881), journalist and essayist
- Julia Ringwood Coston, 19th-century Afro-American publisher and magazine editor who founded the first magazine ever published for black women

== D ==
- W. E. B. Du Bois (1868–1963), writer, activist, scholar

== G ==
- Henry Louis Gates Jr. (born 1950), literary critic and Harvard professor
- Lawrence Otis Graham (born 1962), attorney, speaker, and New York Times best-selling author
- John Langston Gwaltney (1928–1998), anthropologist, author of Drylongso

== H ==
- Karla F. C. Holloway (born 1949), author, scholar, professor, administrator Duke University
- bell hooks (1952–2021), feminist, author, professor

== K ==
- Elizabeth Keckley (1818–1907), wrote a controversial book about her time at the White House as Mary Todd Lincoln's employee and confidante

== M ==
- E. Frederic Morrow (c. 1906–1994), author of Black Man in the White House, a memoir of his years as the first African American appointed to a president's administrations (1955–1960)

== N ==
- Neil deGrasse Tyson (born 1958), astrophysicist and science communicator

== P ==
- Rosa Parks (1913–2005), civil rights leader

== S ==
- Thomas Sowell (born 1930), economist, syndicated columnist, academic at the Hoover Institution

== T ==
- Beverly Daniel Tatum, writer, former president of Spelman College
- Lynn Toler (born 1959), arbitrator on Divorce Court
- Lisa Tolliver, academic-practitioner, editor, journalist, and writer

== W ==
- Cornel West (born 1953), public intellectual, author, Princeton University professor
- Steven Whitehurst (born 1967), award-winning author

== Z ==
- Zamba Zembola (born c. 1780), the supposed author of an 1847 slave narrative, The Life and Adventures of Zamba, an African Negro King; and his Experience of Slavery in South Carolina

== See also ==
- List of African-American authors
