= Ruth Todd =

Ruth Todd may refer to:

- Ruth Todd (researcher), American geologist and paleontologist
- Ruth D. Todd, African-American writer
