= African-American teachers =

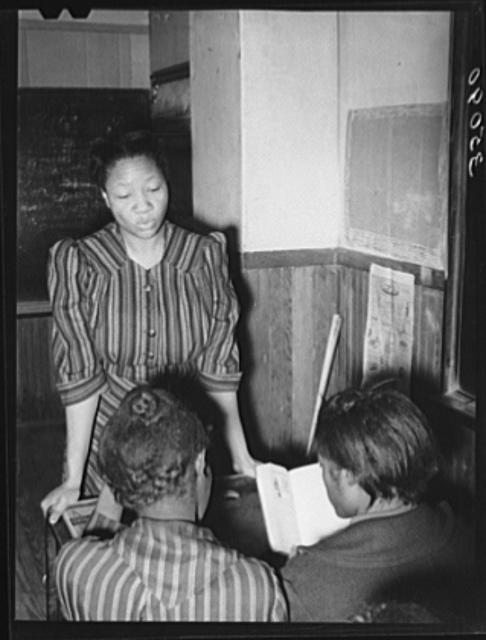
An African-American teacher

African-American teachers educated African Americans and taught each other to read during slavery in the South. People who were enslaved ran small schools in secret, since teaching those enslaved to read was a crime (see Slave codes). Meanwhile, in the North, African Americans worked alongside Whites. Many privileged African Americans in the North wanted their children taught with White children, and were pro-integration. The Black middle class preferred segregation. During the post-Reconstruction era African Americans built their own schools so they did not have White control. The Black middle class believed that it could provide quality education for their community. This resulted in the foundation of teaching as a profession for Blacks. Some Black families had multiple individuals who dedicated their lives to teaching. They felt that they could empower their communities. In the late 19th and early 20th centuries, Southern States passed Jim Crow laws to mandate racial segregation in all aspects of society, and prevent Blacks from voting. Racism made it difficult for Black professionals to work in other professions. In 1950, African American teachers made up about half of African-American professionals.

The Great Depression in the 1930s had a dramatic economic impact among Southern Black Americans. This resulted in the degradation of segregated Black schools. African Americans were deteriorating economically and pled for integration, in hopes of making more resources available. The legal desegregation of schools in the U.S. by federal enforcement of a series of Supreme Court decisions following Brown v. Board of Education in 1954. Desegregation resulted in the closure of Black schools and the loss of most jobs for African-American teachers. Whites did not want their children taught by Black teachers. The African-American communities lost their leaders and role models. It created a distrust in schools from the Black community.

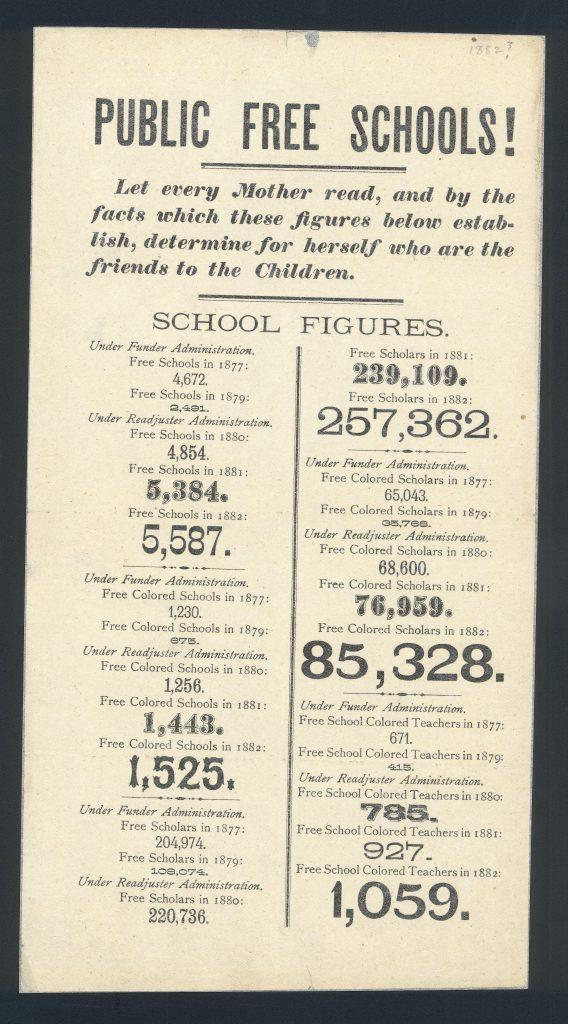
Public Free School, 1882

== Black women educators (19th century) ==
=== Overview ===
During the 19th century in the United States, African-American advocates and educators began to teach across the states. Slavery in the United States was abolished in mid 19th century and allowed for the establishment and push for education among black communities. Education varied in the North and the South yet prominent figures wrote speeches and fought for equal education. African Americans would battle for equality, rights, and inclusion with education as their weapon. Women were the ones to many times lead initiatives to further education for colored students, advocate for attainment of higher education, and promote equitable education opportunity.

==== Pre– and post–Civil War education ====
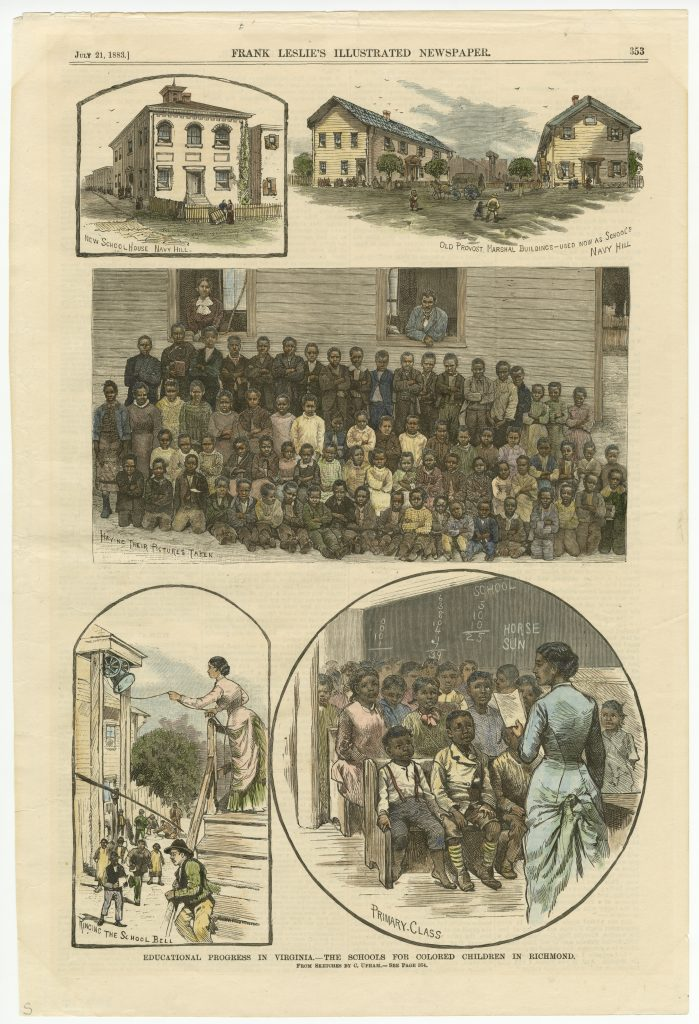
A page from Frank Leslie's Illustrated Newspaper, published on July 21, 1883, includes a montage of colored engravings depicting school life for African American children in Virginia.

The history of education during the 19th century is often divided into two periods: the time of slavery to the rise of insurrection movements (1835) – a time where people were often asked whether "it was prudent to educate the slaves". Secondly, when abolitionist were fighting to end slavery and offer education to "cultivate" the minds of those enslaved. The early-advocates of the education for African-Americans were those who masters who wanted to increase the economic efficiency of their labor supply, sympathetic persons who wished to help the oppressed, and zealous missionaries who taught people who were enslaved, English in hopes they learn the principles of the Christian religion. Freedman school, missions and churches were some of the first few spaces enslaved people were encouraged to start school. The intentions of these institutions were muffled (See Freedmen's Bureau). Such exposure to education allowed others to see the benefits of educated enslaved people. The uplift led to the establishment of separate schooling.

Education was a recurring subject in the pre-civil war era and can be cited to be a subject of interest at the 1843 National Convention of Colored Citizens. Education was a way to obtain equality and become established when considering class. Early efforts highlight the importance of eliminating inequality and education being a tool to succeed that. The African-American struggle for education was rooted in the desire to bring about social and political equality and to defeat racial prejudice. After the American Civil War, there were localized efforts to establish schools and create school systems. It was the former enslaved who, during reconstruction, gave the Southern States their first effective system of free public schools and industrialization led to the establishment of permanently opened and black owned schools.

Later-advocates of education were characterized, specifically women educational advocates, as fighting for eradicating prejudice and promoting Christian love, training black women and men to be educator-activist who would fight for civil rights, and, lastly, cultivating moral and intellectual character in children and youth. The shift turned to a focus of community. Ongoing constraints limited educators from teaching in the classroom. It was common for school districts to obstruct black educators by placing mandated teacher trainings only available to white educators. Obtaining higher education was often emphasized throughout leaders speeches. In order to battle certain expectations and eliminate the prejudice that black educators faced, many employed a strategy that called for the emphasis of Christian Ideals. Additionally, many of the Black educators that championed for equal access to education were also fighting for gender equality (See Black feminism#19th century). The 19th century is where the fight for education finds itself beyond the classroom and concerning many other societal issues.

==== Advocates ====
Aside from being activist during the nineteenth century, these notable figures also saw the importance in teaching. Many times, whilst teaching, the women would be exempt or have to step away from their roles in order to speak freely about the racial, classist, and sexist injustices plaguing the black community. These figures, unknowingly, were highlighting the efforts to promote opportunity and intersectionality when advocating for change.

Notable Figures	Background (As Educators)
Mary Ann Shadd	After the Fugitive Slave Act was passed in 1850, Mary Ann Shad Cary moved to Canada in a community predominantly black. Here, she taught at an integrated school and later left back to the United States in which she worked as a journalist.
Anna J. Cooper	A student and educator, Anna Julia Cooper took steps to gain access to classes only available to men at the university she attended. Cooper also obtained her PhD from the University of Paris-Subbron. In papers, she often hit on the theme of education and its impact. In a portion of her book A Voice from the South, she highlights of the overlap between the fight for Christian beliefs, womanhood, and higher education.
Ann Plato	Ann Plato – An educator who published a collection of essays and prose. In her work, she calls to action educators and the nation to ensure that children seek education—and those capable, pursue higher education to teach the future generations. Little is known about Plato aside from her published works. Her thoughts and quotes on education are often used.
Ida B. Wells	Early in her career, Ida B. Wells Barnett was an elementary school teacher in Memphis Tennessee. She started teaching at the age of fourteen. While teaching, Barnett began her own newspaper titled Free Speech that cost her the teaching position. Barnett turned her career to focus on journalism and sharing narratives highlighting issues affecting black communities such as lynching and the criminal justice system.
Lucy Craft Laney	An educator from Georgia that works at many schools across the state until founding the Haines Institute in Augusta. There she serves as the principal of the school. Still, she publishes work regarding the role of women and the power and influence that can be obtained through education. She encourages woman to work and pursue school in order to gain status. Throughout her work, she simultaneously mentions high incarceration rates and race disparities.

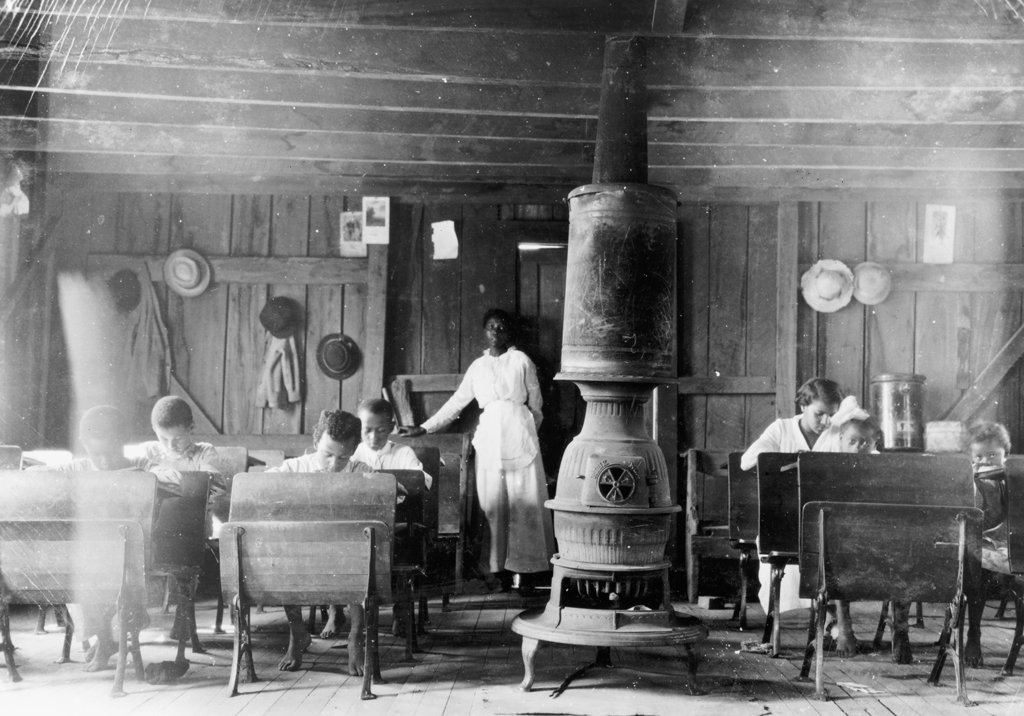
School Interior, 19th century

==== List of works ====
The legacy of notable black women educators is able to be preserved through their own narratives and works. Below is a list of essays, prose, speeches, and more that touch on the black women experience specific to education.

- 1841 - Ann Plato, "Education"
- 1886 - Virginia W. Broughton, "Womanhood a Vital Element in the Regeneration and Progress of Race"
- 1887 - Mary V. Cool, "Women's Place in the World of the Denomination"
- 1887 - Ida B. Wells Barnett, "Our Women"
- 1889 - Julia Caldwell-Frazier, "The Decisions of Time"
- 1891 - Fanny M. Jackson Coopin, "A Plea for the Mission School"
- 1892 - Anne J. Cooper, A Voice from the South
- 1893 - Anne J. Cooper & Fannie Barrier Williams, The Intellectual Progress of the Colored Women of the United States Since the Emancipation Proclamation
- 1893 - Sarah J. Early, "The Organized Efforts of the Colored Women of The South to Improve Their Condition"
- 1894 - Virginia W. Broughton, "Woman's Work"
- 1895 - Victoria Earle Matthews. "The Value of Race Literature"
- 1898 - Mary Church Terrell, "The Progress of Colored Women"
- 1899 - Lucy Craft Laney, "The Burden of the Educated Woman"

=== Quotes ===
- "A good education is another name for happiness" - Ann Plato (1841)

- "No one suffers under the weight of this burden as the educated Negro woman does; and she must help to lift it." - Lucy Craft Laney (1899)

- "Whatever excuse may be offered in the states for exclusive institutions, I am convinced that … none could be offered with a shadow of reason, and with this conviction, I opened school here with the condition of admission to children of all complexions" - Mary Ann Shadd Cary (1853)

- "Black Women saw education as a vehicle to ready both personal and larger community goals" - Daina Ramey Berry & Jermaine Thibodeaux
