= Jeffrey Daniels (author) =

American poet, artist, and professor

Jeffrey Daniels is a Chicago-raised African-American poet, artist, and professor at Harold Washington College. He has previously taught at Columbia College Chicago and the School of the Art Institute of Chicago.

== Works ==
- God Noise (2004, ISBN 0-9760508-0-3)
- Black Girls and Bicycles (2006, ISBN 0-9760508-1-1)

== See also ==
- African American literature
- List of African-American writers
