= Ora Mae Lewis Martin =

- Born: Ora Mae Lewis; March 29, 1918; New Orleans, Louisiana
- Died: September 28, 2005 (aged 87); New Orleans, Louisiana
- Occupation: Writer
- Website: oramlewis.com

Ora Mae Lewis Martin (March 29, 1918 – September 28, 2005) was an American journalist and writer.

== Biography ==
Martin née Lewis was born in New Orleans, Louisiana on March 29, 1918. Her writing career started at the age of nine when a short story she wrote, The First Christmas, was published in the New Orleans Times-Picayune.

Martin attended Xavier University of Louisiana from 1936 through 1947, earning her undergraduate degree. She went on to earn a master's degree in 1961 from Loyola University in New Orleans.

From 1936 through 1941 she contributed a variety of columns and stories for the local African American newspaper The Sepia Socialite. Notable writings include A Letter to the Archbishop, published in 1938, which discussed racial segregation at the Catholic "International Eucharistic Congress" held that year in New Orleans, and the series Black Hands and Yellow Cheeks which ran in 1940. She also contributed to the local newspapers The Louisiana Weekly, the Morning Tribune, the New Orleans Item-Tribune, and the New Orleans Sentinel.

In 1944 Martin founded a weekly magazine named "Twinkle". She edited the magazine with her fiance, Lawrence Martin, who was the managing editor. The magazine included current events and its audience was mainly New Orleanians, specifically those stationed in the Pacific during World War II. The magazine was in publication through 1949. A complete run of the magazine is held in the Xavier University of Louisiana, Archives & Special Collections.

She married Lawrence Martin in 1946 and the couple would have seven children.

In 2000 Maranatha Press published Martin's historical novel Seeds in the Wind.

Martin died on September 28, 2005, in New Orleans.
