= Tracie Howard =

African-American writer of fiction

Tracie Howard is an African-American writer of fiction.

A native of Atlanta, Georgia, Howard worked at Xerox, Johnson and Johnson and American Express before penning Revenge Is Best Served Cold with co-author Danita Carter. The subsequent deal with Penguin Putnam led to several novels including Talk of The Town (2002) and Success Is The Best Revenge (2004). Her first solo novel, Why Sleeping Dogs Lie, was published in 2003. Howard was a featured author in Turner Broadcasting's 2003 Trumpet Awards.

In addition to her career as an author, Howard is curator and co-founder of the wearable art company, Ethos.

== Bibliography ==
- Revenge is Best Served Cold (2001) ISBN 978-0-451-20475-2 (with Danita Carter)
- Talk of the Town (2002) ISBN 978-0-451-20703-6 (with Danita Carter)
- Why Sleeping Dogs Lie (2003) ISBN 978-0-451-20977-1
- Success is the Best Revenge (2004) ISBN 978-0-451-21146-0 (with Danita Carter)
- Never Kiss and Tell (2004) ISBN 978-0-451-21305-1
- Gold Diggers (2007) ISBN 978-0-385-51798-0
- Friends and Fauxs (2009) ISBN 978-0-7679-2993-6
