= Roderick D. Bush =

American philosopher

Roderick Douglas Bush (November 12, 1945 – December 5, 2013) was an U.S. born sociologist, social activist, author, public intellectual author and academic primarily concerning the Civil rights movement (1865–1896).

== Biography ==
Born on November 12, 1945, Bush grew up in the "Jim Crow" South before moving to Rochester, New York, as a child. As a teen, he attended Howard University and became involved in the Black Power Movement. He attended the University of Kansas, where he began his doctoral work. He left to become a full-time political activist only to return to academia in 1998. He earned his Ph.D. from Binghamton University in 1992. He served as a faculty member at St. John's University as a Sociology Professor.

Bush died on December 5, 2013.

== Academic specialization ==
At a collegiate level he taught and specialized in race and ethnicity, the black experience, social movements, world-systems studies, globalization, social inequality, social change, urban sociology, community organizing, political sociology.

== Awards ==
- 2015: U.S. Higher Education Faculty Awards, Vol. 1, best overall faculty member, best researcher/scholar, and most helpful to students.
- 2014: American Sociological Association Marxist Section Lifetime Achievement Award
- Professor-Service to Students Seton Hall University 9/97-5/98
- University Research Fellow Seton Hall University 6/97-8/97
- Ford Foundation PostDoctoral
- Fellow Seton Hall University 9/93-8/94
- University Fellow SUNY Binghamton 1/88-6/88
- U.S. Public Health Fellow University of Kansas 9/67-6/70
- National Competitive Scholar Howard University 9/63-6/67
- Ralph Bunche Scholarship Howard University 9/63

== Books ==
Bush was part of a working group of authors in the book Race in the Age of Obama, and a contributor to the book Transnational Africa and Globalization.
He was the author of the books We are Not What We Seem: Black Nationalism and Class Struggle in the American Century, The New Black Vote: Politics and Power in Four American Cities, The End of White World Supremacy: Black Internationalism and the Problem of the Color Line. He also co-authored with Melanie E. L. Bush Tensions in the American Dream: Rhetoric, Reverie or Reality?

In 2019 a collection of scholars, friends and students published: Rod Bush: Lessons from a Radical Black Scholar on Liberation, Love, and Justice https://www.okcir.com/product/rod-bush-lessons-from-a-radical-black-scholar-on-liberation-love-and-justice/> with essays on the lessons that can be learned from Rod's writings, teaching, mentorship and friendship.
