= Samuel Alfred Beadle =

American poet and attorney

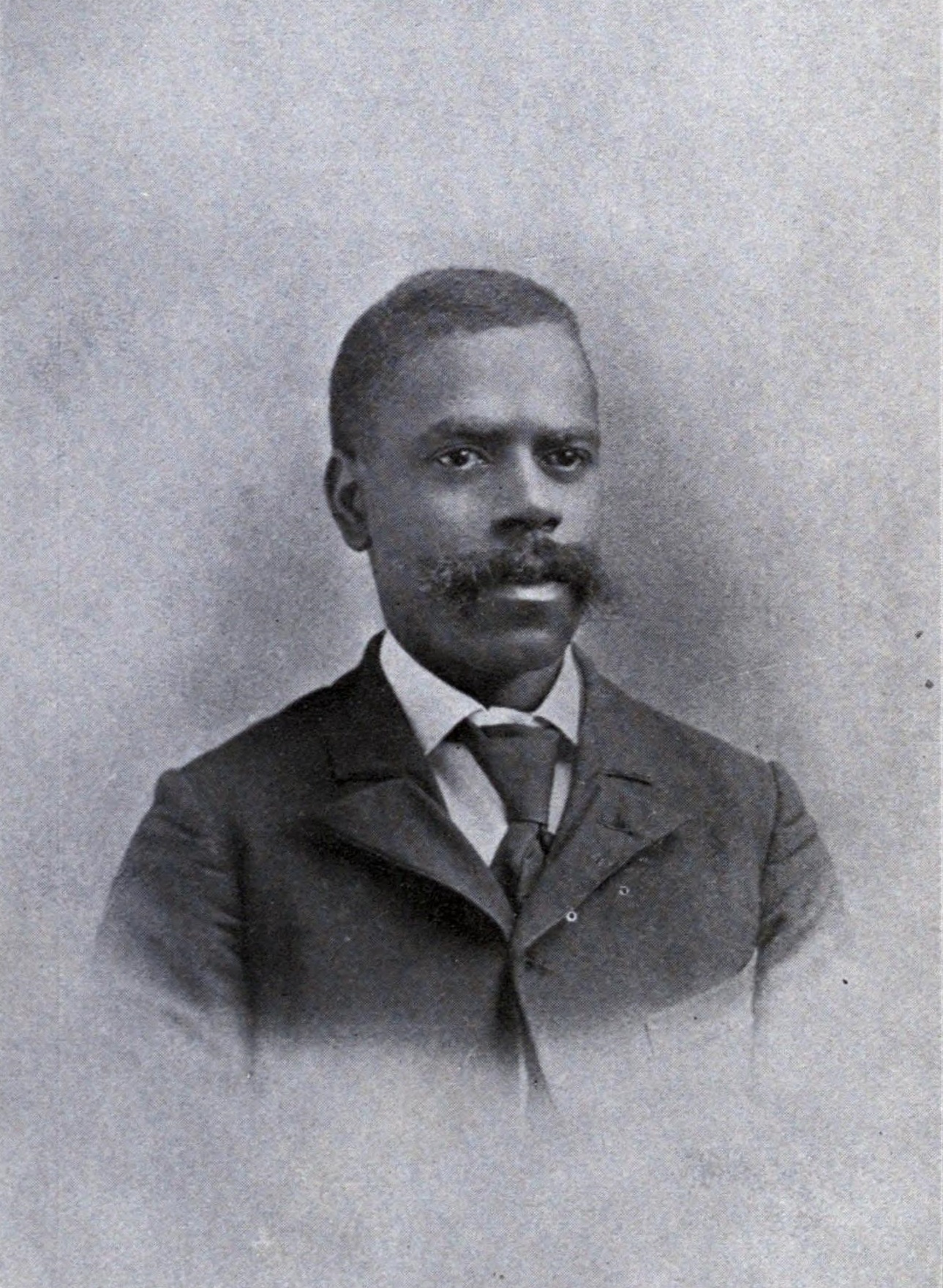
- Born: August 17, 1857; Atlanta
- Died: 1932; Chicago
- Education: Atlanta University, Tougaloo College
- Occupations: Lawyer, poet
- Notable work: Adam Shuffler, Lyrics of "The Underworld", Sketches from Life in Dixie

Samuel Alfred Beadle (August 17, 1857 – 1932) was an American poet and attorney, who was born the son of a slave in Atlanta, Georgia, and died in Chicago, Illinois. He published three books of poetry and stories.

After the Civil War, Beadle moved to Jackson, Mississippi, where he studied and practiced law, at one time in partnership with Perry Howard. He married Aurelia Thomas and their son, Richard Henry Beadle (1884–1971) became a prominent photographer in Jackson.

== Early life and legal career ==
Beadle was born into slavery on 17 August 1857 in Atlanta. Toward the end of the Civil War his mother brought him to Rankin County, Mississippi, and after the war they moved to Jackson. A schoolteacher by profession, he studied for the Mississippi bar examination with the help of Anselm McLaurin, a Confederate veteran who later became governor and a U.S. senator, and passed it in 1884. Although segregation laws kept him from appearing before many Jackson judges, he kept a successful civil practice for more than forty years with a fellow African American partner. Mississippi Supreme Court Chief Justice William Waller later said Beadle had passed his examination "in outstanding form". Beadle was not the first Black man admitted to the Mississippi bar: A. W. Shadd was admitted in 1873, and by the 1920s Mississippi had 11 Black lawyers. In 1930 Beadle moved to Chicago, where he practiced law until his death in 1932.

== Writings ==
Beadle's first book, Sketches from Life in Dixie (Chicago: Scroll Publishing & Literary Syndicate, 1899), contained seven stories and fifty-three poems. His second book, Adam Shuffler (Jackson: Harmon Publishing Co., 1901), was a collection of short stories that comment on African American life in the South, some of them written in regional dialect, and he published his last volume of poetry, Lyrics of the Under World, in 1912. The full text of Lyrics of the Under World is available in Lehigh University's digital anthology of African American poetry. Lyrics of the Under World also includes early photographs by his son Richard H. Beadle, one of Mississippi's few Black photographers.

== Legacy ==
Beadle's great-grandson is Michael Middleton, former interim president of the University of Missouri System. A play at the University of Missouri–St. Louis was inspired by Middleton's reflections on his great-grandfather's life and poem.

== Writings ==
- Sketches from Life in Dixie (Chicago: Scroll Publishing and Literary Syndicate, 1899)
- Lyrics of "The Underworld" (Jackson, Mississippi: W.A. Scott, 1912)
- Adam Shuffler (Jackson, Mississippi: Harmon Publishing Co., 1901)

== Bibliography ==
- Randy Patterson, Samuel Alfred Beadle: Black Mississippi Poet of the Early Twentieth Century, POMPA (Publications of the Mississippi Philological Association), 131-136 (1992)
