= Pamela Thomas-Graham =

American businesswoman

- Born: June 24, 1963 (age 63)
- Education: Harvard University (BA, MBA, JD)
- Occupation: Clorox lead independent director
- Spouse: Lawrence Otis Graham (m. 1991; died 2021)
- Children: 3

Pamela Thomas-Graham (born June 24, 1963) is an American businesswoman, corporate leader, and author. In August 2016, Thomas-Graham was elected by the Clorox Company board of directors as the lead independent director. Previously, she was a senior executive at Credit Suisse, and served on the bank's 10-member executive board, until October 2015; was a partner at McKinsey and Company; president and CEO of CNBC; and Group President of Liz Claiborne.

== Biography ==
=== Early life and education ===
Thomas-Graham was raised in Detroit, Michigan, with her older brother, Vincent, where her mother, Marian, was a social worker, and her father, Albert, a Detroit city government employee, "worked in real estate", as the deputy director of the Buildings and Safety Engineering Department.

Thomas-Graham graduated Phi Beta Kappa from Harvard University with a B.A. in economics, magna cum laude, in 1985.

She graduated from Harvard Business School with an MBA in 1988, and from Harvard Law School with a Juris Doctor in 1989. She was an editor of Harvard Law Review.

=== Career ===
Thomas-Graham began her career at Goldman, Sachs & Co., where she was a summer associate in the investment banking division while she was a student at Harvard Business School. In 1995, she was the first African American woman to become partner at the international management consulting firm McKinsey & Company.

In 1999, was named one of top 10 consultants in America by Consulting Magazine.

In 1999, Thomas-Graham joined NBC as president of CNBC.com and in 2001, she became chief executive of the cable TV network CNBC. Her successful launch of the network's business website became a Harvard Business School Case study authored by Harvard Business School Professor Rosabeth Moss Kanter. In September 2005, she left CNBC and was hired as president of Liz Claiborne, Inc.

In January 2010, Thomas-Graham joined the executive board of Credit Suisse as Chief Talent, Branding and Communications Officer. In August 2016, she was elected by Clorox to serve as the Lead independent director of its board until February 2021.

Thomas-Graham has served on the board of the New York Philharmonic and Parsons School of Design. She is a member of the Economic Club of New York and the Council on Foreign Relations. On December 4th 2017, she was appointed to Non-Executive Director of Bank of N.T. Butterfield & Limited Son. They are a full service bank and wealth manager located in Hamilton Bermuda. She served in this position until 2024. On April 23, 2018, she was appointed as an independent director of Norwegian Cruise Lines. She made a lane for herself being involved in new but burgeoning companies. For example, she served on the board of Rivian from 2020 to 2024. Since March 2018, Thomas-Graham has served on the board of Peloton. Since 2020 she has served as member on the Board of Directors for Bumble Inc.

Thomas-Graham is the author of a three-title book series, "Ivy League Mysteries", published by Simon & Schuster: A Darker Shade Of Crimson (1998), Blue Blood (1999), and Orange Crushed (2004).

Thomas-Graham is the creator and owner of Dandelion Chandelier, a blog that explores the intersection of luxury, wellness, marketing, and technology.

== Personal life ==
Thomas-Graham and her late husband the author and attorney, Lawrence Otis Graham (1961–2021) have three children together and lived in New York City.
