= Glenville Lovell =

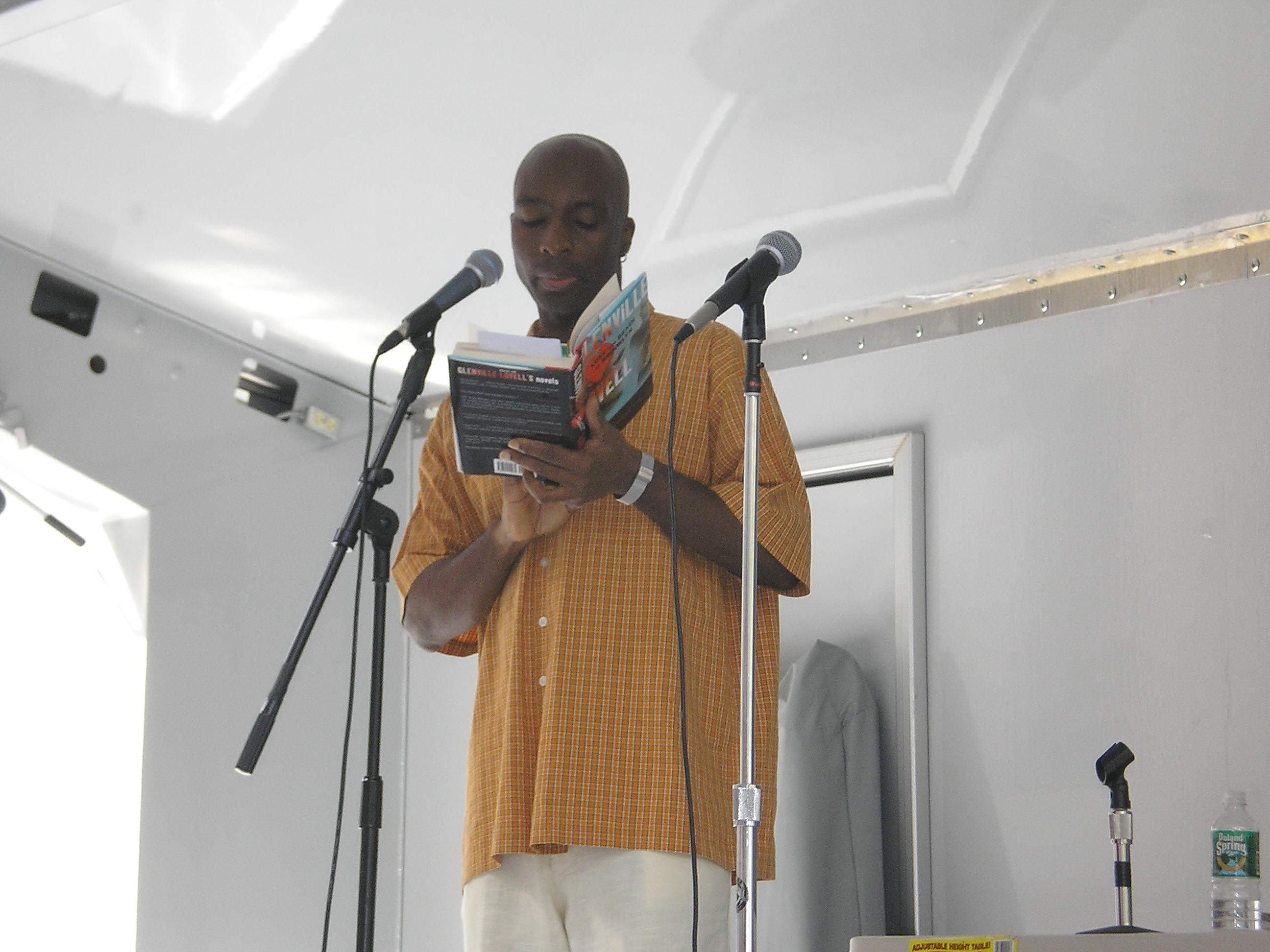
Glenville Lovell

Glenville Lovell is a Barbadian writer, dancer, novelist and playwright.

Lovell was born in a Chattel house in Parish Land, Christ Church, Barbados and grew up around rich storytelling among the sugar cane workers. His first novel, Fire in the Canes was published in 1995 and was met with critical acclaim. So too was his second novel, Song of Night, published in 1998.

Lovell's work as a playwright earned him the 2002 Frank Collymore Literary Award for the Barbados-based Mango Ripe! Mango Sweet!. Many of his novels and plays have represented Barbados at the Caribbean Festival of Arts.

== External links and references ==
- Official Glenville Lovell website
- Don Rubin; Carlos Solorzano (8 October 2013). World Encyclopedia of Contemporary Theatre: The Americas. Routledge. p. 198. ISBN 978-1-136-35921-7.
