= Juanita Harrison =

African-American writer

- Juanita Harrison, from a 1935 newspaper
- Born: December 28, 1887; Columbus, Mississippi
- Died: 1967 (aged 79–80); Honolulu County, Hawaii
- Occupations: Writer, traveler, domestic worker

Juanita Harrison (December 28, 1887 – 1967) was an African-American writer known for her autobiography, My Great, Wide, Beautiful World (1936), which narrates her extensive travel abroad.

== Early life ==
Harrison was born in Columbus, Mississippi, the daughter of Jones Harrison and Rosa Greglar. Her early years started with "an endless round of cooking, washing, and ironing in an overburdened household." Her school education ceased when she was about ten years old.

== Travels and writing ==
Harrison began her travels at the age of 16, eventually exploring 22 countries. She remarked about her journeys, "Can't but help love the last place best" (19). Harrison expresses her travels as individual revelations and experiences that could not be duplicated. She said of the Taj Mahal, "It thrilled me through as the beauty cannot be painted...this was built through love, from the love of a man for a woman so it was much nicer" (133).

Harrison funded her travels by working various jobs wherever she happened to be. She described being employed as a nurse, nanny, and cleaning lady. Her initial money came from former employers, George W. Dickinson and Myra K. Dickinson of Los Angeles. The Dickinsons invested portions of her salary in real estate and gave her the profits. Harrison had long expressed a love of travel and a need to see the world. The investments soon yielded $200 in interest per year. Harrison dedicated her book to Myra Dickinson.

Harrison was involved in the September 10, 1928 Zaječí-Břeclav train accident in Czechoslovakia. Harrison wrote of trying to comfort a young German woman who was mortally injured and died in her arms. She was able to turn her most dangerous experience into profit; she asked for compensation of damages for a black eye and received $200.

An employer in Hawai'i, E. A. Tufts, and a Paris employer's daughter, Mildred Morris, both found her travel letters to have literary potential. Tufts compiled Harrison's letters about her travels, and submitted them for publication as My Great, Wide, Beautiful World (1936). The book consists of her journal entries, mistakes included on her insistence: "just as I have written them misteakes [sic] and all. I said that if the mistekes [sic] are left out there'll be only blank". Selections were published in the Atlantic Monthly in 1935. My Great, Wide, Beautiful World was widely reviewed.Time magazine reviewed the book, saying: "Readers of My Great Wide Beautiful World will admire not only Juanita's freedom from economic shackles but her impressionistic spelling, sometimes better than right." A writer for the Honolulu Advertiser called her adventures "the most deliciously hilarious trip ever made around the globe".

Harrison autographed a copy of her book and gave several personal photographs of herself to Mr and Mrs Frank Estes, on whose property in Hawaii she lived when she returned from her world travels. She was describe as living in a tent with her dog Pluto in Waikiki in 1935 and 1937. A second book was mentioned, but never published. She was in Brazil in 1939, and lived "nearly a decade" in Buenos Aires, before returning to Hawai'i.

Harrison died in 1967 and was laid to rest at The Valley of Temples in Oahu.

== Later critical reception ==
According to Rebecca Chalmers Barton, Harrison is a woman "who is not concerned about all the whys and wherefores of her past life but who only wants to convey her immediate joys to the readers." (89) Debra J. Rosenthal argued in 2000 that the book concentrates on the "here and now." For example, Harrison uses the present tense throughout the book in her conversational tone and carefree manner. While in Belgrade, a passing girl carrying food caught Harrison's attention and she wrote, "where ever you go I'll flower it smelled so good I flowered Her 2 blocks" (88). Although the girl was a stranger to Harrison, the writer did follow the food seller to some extent, demonstrating that the "here and now" could be at any time and in anyplace for Harrison. This allows, as Barton says, the readers to gather and share in Harrison's immediate joys. In 1994, paper engineer and book artist Carol Barton quoted Harrison's vivid description of a train ride from Istanbul in A Journal Of One's Own, a guide to making and writing a journal. In 2020, Lapham's Quarterly carried an article about Harrison and her book, "Around the World in Eight Years" by literary scholar Cathryn Halverson, as part of a series on past bestsellers. Halveron notes Harrison's "idiosyncratic orthography and grammar", explaining that "She manipulates language in unlikely ways, with her fused sentences often building toward climactic surprise endings."
