= Robert Earl Price =

American playwright and poet (1942–2025)

- Born: 1942; Virginia, US
- Died: April 16, 2025 (aged 83); Chestertown, Maryland, US
- Education: Clark College; American Film Institute
- Occupations: Playwright and poet
- Awards: William Wyler award

Robert Earl Price (1942 – April 16, 2025) was an American playwright and poet. He was a recipient of the American Film Institute's William Wyler award for screenwriting and was the author of four books of poetry and had eleven plays produced in American regional theaters and abroad in Berlin and Johannesburg. He was artist-in-residence in the Drama Department at Washington College in Chestertown, Maryland, where he also served as artistic director of the Charles Sumner G.A.R. Post #25, a historic hall built in 1908 to honor African-American veterans of the Civil War.

== Early life ==
Robert Earl Price was born in Virginia and grew up in Atlanta, Georgia. He studied at Clark College in Atlanta and graduated from the American Film Institute's Film Conservatory in Los Angeles in 1977.

== Early career ==
Price spent fifteen years in Los Angeles working in the Black film movement and collaborated with artists associated with the L.A. Rebellion, including Julie Dash, Halie Gerima and Charles Burnett. Price received an NAACP Image Award for service with the Black Anti-Defamation Coalition formed with Pearl Sharp in 1980. During this period, Price worked as a screenwriter, for television and film. This includes sole credit on an episode of Palmerstown USA (1980), a CBS series by Alex Haley and Norman Lear, as well as work on The Lazarus Syndrome (1978) and Freedom Road (1979).

== Poet and playwright ==
By 1985, Price had settled in Atlanta, Georgia, and worked primarily as a poet and playwright. He was appointed playwright in residence at 7 Stages Theater in Atlanta in 1987. At 7 Stages, he premiered several plays beginning with Black Cat Bones for Seven Sons in 1988. Several of his plays took jazz or blues musicians as their subject and married poetry and experimental drama: Yardbird's Vamp (1990), Blue Monk (1996), and HUSH: Composing Blind Tom Wiggins (2002). The latter play, based on the true story of a blind savant pianist born as a slave to a Confederate general and attaining a national reputation, was hailed by the Atlanta Journal-Constitution as the "most important Atlanta premiere of the new century". Blue Monk was featured as part of the Cultural Olympiad connected with the 1996 Olympics held in Atlanta. The play, about Thelonious Monk, was later performed at the Windy Brow Theater in Johannesburg, South Africa.

Price's play Come on in My Kitchen (2006) uses the myth of blues guitarist Robert Johnson's legendary deal with the devil to discuss the compromises of African-American celebrities, with characters clearly based on Colin Powell, Jesse Jackson, Condoleezza Rice, and Clarence Thomas. The play won the Gene Gabriel Moore Playwriting Award. The contribution of this work to the ever-evolving myth of Robert Johnson is discussed in the film documentary America's Blues (2015).

In 2011, Price's play All Blues was performed at Washington College and at 7 Stages Atlanta. With variations of the Miles Davis composition "All Blues" interweaving through the work, the play reimagines the story of Ray Sprigle, a white reporter from the Pittsburgh Gazette who, in 1948, traveled through the Jim Crow South posing as a black man and recorded his life-changing experiences in a series of articles entitled "I Was a Negro in the South for Thirty Days". Price's 2014 play, Red Devil Moon, was a musical written with composer Pam Ortiz based on excerpts from Cane by Jean Toomer.

Price regularly published poetry in literary magazines including The Chattahoochee Review and the Atlanta Review; he was awarded the Atlanta Mayor's Fellowship for Poetry in 1998, the same year he was part of the Georgia Poetry Circuit Tour. In 1991, he was selected for a National Endowment for the Arts Literature Fellowship for Poetry. He published several collections of poetry, with many poems written in a style inflected by American blues music. His most recent collection is Wise Blood (2004).

Price died on April 16, 2025, aged 83, in Chestertown, Maryland.
