= Joseph Jewell =

American academic

Joseph O. Jewell is a professor of Black Studies and Department Head at the University of Illinois Chicago (UIC). Prior to his time at UIC, Jewell was an associate professor of African American Studies and Department Chair at Loyola Marymount University. At Loyola Marymount, Jewell came to the African American Studies Department following the lead of John Davis and Ronald Barrett. Jewell also held an appointment at Texas A&M University as an Associate Professor of Sociology. He also served as interim director of Texas A&M's Race and Ethnic Studies Institute. His research has included examining race and class in social and reform movements of the nineteenth and twentieth centuries. He published Race, Social Reform and the Making of a Middle Class: The American Missionary Association in Atlanta, 1870–1900, (Rowman and Littlefield, 2007). He is also the co-author of "The Mis-Education of Black America: Black Education Since An American Dilemma" with Walter R. Allen in An American Dilemma Revisited: Race Relations in A Changing World (Russell Sage, 1996).

== Education ==
In 1991, Jewell received a Bachelor of Arts (BA) from the University of California at Berkeley. In 1998, he received his Ph.D. from University of California at Los Angeles (UCLA).

=== Educational career ===
==== Associate professor at Texas A&M ====
Jewell served as a sociology professor in the College of Liberal Arts at Texas A&M. Jewell also served as the interim director of the Race and Ethnic Studies Institute. While at Texas A&M Jewell noted:

My research is also central to my teaching

His extensive research views the relationship between racial identities and class identities "in movements geared toward moral/social reform."

==== Chair at Loyola Marymount University ====
Jewell had begun working with the faculty and staff of the African American Studies Department to create a new identity for the department. Jewell's addition to the LMU community brings expertise and a wealth of new initiatives; however, he also sees it vital to acknowledge the former heads of the department.

I am truly honored to join Loyola Marymount University as chair of its African American Studies department. As I do so, I am aware that I stand on the shoulders of giants: Dr. John Davis and Dr. Ronald Barrett have served the department and the African American community at LMU with distinction.

Jewell hopes to integrate the mission of LMU, African American Studies as a discipline, and issues of African Americans in the Los Angeles area. He has many goals in mind for the department; these include adding new faculty, new courses, updating the website, making changes to the core curriculum, strengthening relationships within other departments, presenting resources to students, and research opportunities. Jewell envisions the changes in the department can take place with the support of faculty, students, and alumni.

During the fall of 2008, Jewell teaches a course on the Sociology of the Black Community (AFAM 335).

==== Return to Texas A&M University ====
In 2010, Jewell returned from Loyola Marymount University and is once again a Sociology professor in the College of Liberal Arts at Texas A&M.
