= Junius Edwards =

American writer

- Born: April 20, 1929; Alexandria, Louisiana, USA
- Died: March 22, 2008 (aged 78); Manhattan, New York City
- Occupation: Author
- Writing career
- Genres: Short story, novel

Junius Edwards (April 20, 1929 – March 22, 2008) was an African-American fiction writer of the 1950s and 1960s whose work primarily focused on the civil rights movement and on racial issues faced by African Americans in the military and in the American South.

== Biography ==
Edwards was born in Alexandria, Louisiana, on April 20, 1929. At the age of 18, he joined the United States Army, serving for nine years in Korea and in Japan, and working for the Judge Advocate General Corps and the Army Counter Intelligence Corps.

Upon leaving the Army, he used the Montgomery GI Bill to pay for his education at the University of Oslo, Norway. There, he focused on writing.

In 1958, Edwards won the first prize in the Writer's Digest Short Story Contest for his piece "Liars Don't Qualify," which tells the story of Will Harris, a fictional character who, like Edwards himself, is an Army veteran. Harris tries to register to vote in the South, but, after being given a hard time by the white voter registrants, is ultimately disqualified from registering.

The following year, after winning the contest, Edwards was awarded the Eugene F. Saxton Fellowship for creative writing. Works he produced during this time include the stories "Duel with the Clock," "Mother Dear and Daddy," and the novel If We Must Die.

This last work, If We Must Die, is a re-telling of "Liars Don't Qualify." According to The Concise Oxford Companion to African American Literature, If We Must Die is "a novel of multifaceted irony."

Its simplicity of language and character does not belie the dehumanization of African Americans; the entrenched dominance of the southern white power structure during the 1950s; and the violence that affects the life of any African American perceived as a threat to this structure. The self-esteem of the main character, a returning Korean War veteran, is contrasted with the white voter registrar, who refuses to allow the veteran to register on the grounds that he lied about being a member of the Army Reserve. The veteran is later beaten and threatened with castration. Because Edwards was born in Alexandria, Louisiana, and in his twenties [served] during the Korean War, his novel may have resulted from observation or experience.

During the 1960s, he worked in Manhattan, New York City as a copywriter for advertising agencies and went on to establish his own agency: Junius Edwards Inc., one of the first black owned agencies to exist in the city. His work has been published in many anthologies of African-American writing and Civil Rights literature, including Calling the Wind (ed. Clarence Major) and Short Stories of the Civil Rights Movement (ed. Margaret Earley Whitt), among others.

Edwards died on March 22, 2008, in Manhattan, New York City.
