= Lonnie Dixon =

American basketball official

Lonnie Dixon (18 October 1932 – 20 December 2011) was an NCAA Division I men's basketball official, working in the Mountain West Conference, Big 12 Conference, Sun Belt Conference, and several other conferences.

== Controversy ==
Dixon was suspended by the Mountain West Conference in February 2004 for "inadvertently" blowing his whistle during a BYU/New Mexico basketball game, but did not admit to it during the game. The whistle caused BYU player Mark Bigelow to believe play was stopped and stepped on the court from the bench. Bigelow was called for a technical foul, and New Mexico eventually beat BYU 65–63. Dixon was not allowed to call his next 2 games, as well as the Mountain West Conference tournament.
