= Cheril N. Clarke =

American dramatist

- Born: September 24, 1980 (age 45); Toronto, Ontario, Canada
- Occupations: Author, playwright
- Parent(s): Hyacinth Clarke, Thaddius Clarke
- Website: cherilnclarke.com

Cheril N. Clarke (born September 24, 1980) is a Canadian-born contemporary author and playwright of gay and lesbian romance, drama and comedy.

== Life ==
Though born in Toronto, Ontario, Canada, Clarke's family moved to Miami, Florida when she was six months old. She has lived in the United States for the majority of her life.

She is the last of three children born to Hyacinth and Thaddius Clarke.

== Creative writing ==
=== Books ===
Clarke is the author of many books, including novels, collections of erotic vignettes and poetry.

==== Novels and novelettes ====
- Losing Control (2009)
- Tainted Destiny (2006)
- Intimate Chaos (2005)

==== Short stories ====
- Corsets & Cognac (2020)
- Sweet Dark Rum (2020)
- The Edge of Bliss (2017)
- The Beautiful People: South Beach (2014)
- The Beautiful People: New York City (2012)
- The Beautiful People: Las Vegas (2011)
- The Beautiful People: New Orleans (2011)
- Ecstacy (2010)
- Illusions of Love (2010)

==== Nonfiction ====
- Love and Romance: The Gay and Lesbian Guide to Dating and Romance (2010)

Poetry

- Oxygen (2019)

=== Plays ===
Her novel, Intimate Chaos, has been adapted into a play of the same name and has been mounted in Bordentown, New Jersey, Plainfield, New Jersey and twice in Philadelphia, Pennsylvania. Intimate Chaos was translated to Spanish and performed at the Tercer Amor festival in Puerto Rico under the name Caos Intimo.

Clarke's most recent play, Asylum, was the recipient of the Audience Award of the 2012 Downtown Urban Theater Festival (now known as Downtown Urban Arts Festival) New York and runner-up for best play.

== Business and other contributions ==
Clarke later founded Phenomenal Writing, LLC, a communications consulting agency that provides ghost and speech writing services for executives around the worlds. Notable clients include General Electric and Cisco Systems.

Clarke has also provided commentary for features on NPR. and WPEB 88.1FM Philadelphia.
