= Marian X =

American playwright (born 1944)

Marian X (born Marian Mae Hammonds in 1944) is an American playwright.

== Life ==
Born in Trenton, New Jersey, Marian X and her sister were mostly raised by their father in Baltimore. After angry white men burned her father's delicatessen, the pair were placed with foster parents. She attended an integrated girls' high school, before studying English at Morgan State University.

She married, raising two children before taking a graduate degree in theatre from Villanova University and starting to write plays.

Marian X's 1987 play Wet Carpets was a comedy with music about three women raised as sisters who go through mid life crisis. It was chosen by the Crossroads Theatre Company as the premiere production in 1988 for their New Play Rites series.

== Plays ==
- Idella. First production, Villanova, Pennsylvania, 1983.
- Wet Carpets. First production, Theatre Center, Philadelphia, 1987.
- The Mayor's Wife. First production, Theatre Center, Philadelphia, 1990.
- Warrior Stance (or Sex, A Comedy). First production, Penumbra Theatre Workshop, Minneapolis, Minnesota, 1992.
- The Screened-in Porch. First production, Philadelphia Dramatists Center, Philadelphia, 1994.

== Awards ==
In 1997, Marian X received a fellowship from the Pew Charitable Trusts.
