= Roberta Hoskie =

American real estate broker

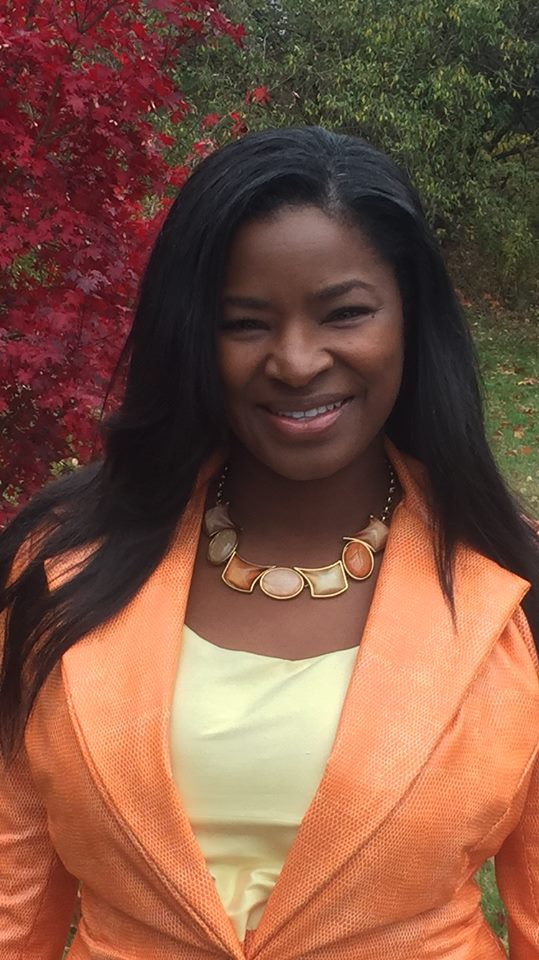
- Born: New Haven, Connecticut, US
- Education: Quinnipiac University

Roberta Hoskie is an American real estate broker and media personality based in New Haven, Connecticut. She is president and CEO of Outreach Realty Servicing, Outreach School of Real Estate, and the 1000 Black Families National Homeownership Program. She is also the founder and Chieftain of the International Millionaire Mindset Sisterhood.

== Early life and education ==
Hoskie was born and raised in New Haven. When she was 8 years old her parents divorced. She and her three siblings stayed with her mother. Her family had financial problems. When she was 17, she became pregnant while living on welfare and experienced homelessness.

After obtaining her associate degree in office administration at Gateway Community College, she worked at Yale University having obtained an internship in the Department of Pediatrics. In 2002, she left Yale University and accepted a position in Bronx, New York as a departmental administrator at Albert Einstein College of Medicine. She later studied business management at Quinnipiac University. In 2012, she was inducted into Gateway Community College's Hall of Fame.

== Career ==
Hoskie took an internship at Yale University when she was 20 and several months later bought a home through Yale's home buying program. She bought a four-family home and rented out some space in it. Four years later, the house's price quadrupled and she sold the house. She bought a new house in 2004 and opened Outreach Property Management.

In 2006, she founded Outreach Foundation, a non-profit organization to help in providing affordable housing for low and moderate income families. Through Outreach Foundation, she coordinates the H.O.P.E. Community Festival & Housing Summit. In August 2011, Hoskie established Outreach Realty Servicing a full service real estate brokerage and also established Outreach Realty School, a real estate school. In 2015, she launched Ms. Millionaire Mindset Academy and Training Seminars.

Hoskie is a co-host of the WYBC 94.3FM talk show, Electric Drum Round Table. In 2015, she launched a reality TV show called CT Money Makers. The program revolves around the process of real estate investment.

In November 2017, Elmer Alvarez, a homeless man in New Haven, Connecticut, found a $10,000 check belonging to Hoskie. After he returned the check, Hoskie decided to assist Alvarez, providing him with housing, and career counseling. This resulted in Alvarez joining the Board of Hoskie's Outreach Foundation.

Actor and real estate developer Malik Yoba featured Hoskie and the Millionaire Mindset Sisterhood in a segment of his "I Build New York" series on real estate development. In April 2022, they collaborated on a series of promotional events, including a gala and workshop on entering the real estate business.

== Personal life ==
Hoskie has three children and married her husband, Christopher Watts, in 2015.
