= Ruth Todd (researcher) =

American geologist, paleontologist

Ruth Todd (October 22, 1913 – August 19, 1984) was an American geologist, paleontologist, and a leading figure in the field of foraminiferal research. She worked for various organizations, such as the U.S. Geological Survey and the Cushman Laboratory for Foraminiferal Research in Sharon, Massachusetts.

== Early life ==
Todd was born on October 22, 1913, in Seattle, Washington, the eldest of five children of John Nelson and Margaret Fordyce Todd. The family lived on Mercer Island in Lake Washington until 1925, when her father moved them to Gering Valley in Nebraska, to help run her grandfather's farm. Todd had kept a journal that documented her times living and helping on the farm. Upon the latter's death in 1928, the family returned to Mercer Island. Todd's initial infatuation with geology led her to create somewhat of a makeshift laboratory in her basement.

== Education ==
Todd received her B.Sc. in 1936, then her M.Sc. in 1939 from the University of Washington. She became a teaching fellow at Mount Holyoke College but wanted to expand her research and education. She add applied for various positions, handing in countless resumes and letters which had gone un-noticed. It was then that she decided to contact Joseph A. Cushman who took her on as an assistant. With Dr. Cushman, Todd was able to publish multiple papers with her as the junior author which served to make her more known in the geological community. Apart from helping tremendously with research as well as advancing her techniques, she took notes on Dr. Cushman that would later be used in his biography. After Dr. Cushman's death in 1949, she decided to join the U.S. Geological Survey to expand her research. It was quite efficient for Todd to work as part of the U.S. Geological Survey as she lived relatively close to their Marine Geology branch. This enabled Todd to store many of her research pieces in her house and once again her home turned into a laboratory.

== Career ==
As part of the U.S. Geological Survey, Todd was able to advance her research into the fields of ecology-paleoecology and stratigraphy. She became one of seven trustees—as well as secretary-treasurer—for the Cushman Foundation for Foraminiferal Research, which was created in 1950. In 1955 Todd was elected a fellow of the Geological Society of America, as well as a fellow of the Cushman Foundation. However, it wasn't until 1980 that her scientific contributions were undeniably noted, when she received the first Joseph A. Cushman Award for Foraminiferal Research.

Another notable moment for Todd occurred in 1959 when she shared, with Paul Blackmon, the Society of Economic Paleontologists and Mineralogists Best Paper Award in the Journal of Paleontology. The paper became well noted for the mineralogy of foraminiferan tests.

Much of Todd's research was focused on fauna fossils from islands such as Yap, Saipan, Guam, Fiji, and so on. Many of the fossils that she focused on were relatively unknown and untouched by plenty of other researchers. It was Preston E. Cloud, Jr. who guided Todd in her research with the U.S. Geological Survey and who pushed her to expand her knowledge to encompass fields of stratigraphy and paleoecology.

During, and once retired from her research Todd enjoyed giving back to the community. She did so by giving short talks to both science teachers and science classes in the Martha's Vineyard Regional Highschool. Todd also allocated a notable amount of her time to discussions with past colleagues, discussing much of her research from all over the globe.

== Retirement and death ==
Todd retired from the U.S. Geological Survey in 1974 but continued to spend her time in the library of the Marine Biological Laboratory in Woods Hole, Massachusetts, preparing lists of current publications and writing thoughtful annotations in the Journal of Farminiferal Research.

On August 19, 1984, she died of a heart attack on the island of Martha’s Vineyard, where she had lived and worked for the last ten years after retiring.
