= Steven Whitehurst =

American poet

- Born: Steven Fondren; March 3, 1967 (age 59); Chicago, Illinois, U.S.
- Education: Chicago State University (BA)
- Occupation: Author
- Political party: Independent
- Children: 1

Steven Whitehurst (born March 3, 1967) is an African-American author, poet, and educator who currently resides in Calumet City, Illinois.

== Biography ==
Born Steven Fondren into a single-parent family on the South Side of Chicago, Illinois, he was raised by his mother Oneda Fondren, and grandmother Sarah Fondren. When he was young his mother married and her name became Oneda Whitehurst. Steven was adopted by the groom and his last name was also changed to Whitehurst. At this time he moved to, and subsequently grew up in, Harvey, Illinois.

After graduating from Thornton Township High School in 1984, Whitehurst attended Southern Illinois University at Carbondale where he was a U.S. Air Force ROTC student. He moved on to become a double degree high honors graduate of Thornton Community College—now South Suburban College—with degrees in history and geography. While there Whitehurst was inducted into the Phi Theta Kappa Honor Fraternity. He then graduated cum laude from Chicago State University with a B.A. in history and a minor in political science. Whitehurst later returned to Chicago State University to pursue additional educational credits in the history/ethnic studies graduate degree program. His political activities included participating in civil rights marches for racial/social justice; working as a canvasser for numerous political campaigns including those of Senator Carol Moseley Braun, Judge R. Eugene Pincham, and the Jesse Jackson presidential campaign, 1988; and being appointed and briefly serving as the Illinois Solidarity Party's 2nd Congressional District State Central Committeeman and Thornton Township Committeeman.

After college he worked for the United States Equal Employment Opportunity Commission as an investigator. In 1991, Whitehurst returned to his alma mater -- South Suburban College—as the Academic Skills/Transition Advisor for the Student Support Services TRIO Grant Program. In 1994, he was promoted to an administrative post as the college's Director of Student Development, where he initiated, developed, and oversaw the school's first transfer articulation agreement with a historically Black college/university - Wilberforce University. In the position of Director of Student Development he managed seven departments, both in academic and student support areas—including the Student Support Services Grant Program for which he had previously worked. In 1996, he was forced to retire due to health issues.

Whitehurst is the author of the book Words From An Unchained Mind and contributed to Rodney King And The L.A. Rebellion: Analysis & Commentary By 13 Independent Black Writers. Whitehurst was also among those featured on the nationally televised program Heroes: A Triumph Of Spirit, Vol. 4, which highlighted positive individuals in the African-American community. His book and movie reviews have appeared in numerous publications. Steven has written pieces supporting Barack Obama's presidential campaigns, pieces calling for universal health care in America, and for the legalization of marijuana.

== Books ==
- Words From An Unchained Mind (United Brothers & Sisters Communications Systems, 1991. ISBN 1-56411-014-1)
- Rodney King And The L.A. Rebellion: Analysis & Commentary By 13 Independent Black Writers (United Brothers & Sisters Communications Systems, 1992. ISBN 1-56411-036-2)

== Awards ==
- New Scriblerus Society Creative Excellence Award
- Afrique Newsmagazine 1994 Malcolm X Award for Self-Actualization
- 1995 Hero Award
- Listed in "Who's Who In America"
- Listed in "Who's Who Among African Americans"
- Listed in "Who's Who In Writers, Editors & Poets"

== Reviews ==
- The FBI's War On Black America Documentary By Denis Mueller and Deb Ellis (MPI Home Video, ISBN 1-55607-982-6) - Reviewed in "The National Newport News & Commentator," July/August 1992.
- My Life With The Black Panther Party By Akua Njeri (Burning Spear Publications) - Reviewed in the "South Suburban Standard" Newspaper, January 9, 1992.
- Culture of Violence: The Foundation of White America On Slavery and Genocide By Penny Hess (Burning Spear Publications) - Reviewed in the "Multicultural Publishers Exchange," January/February 1993.
- The Last Speeches of Huey P. Newton Presentations By Omali Yeshitela (Burning Spear Publications) - Reviewed in the "Multicultural Publishers Exchange," January/February 1993.
