= Chalmers Archer =

American writer and professor (1928–2014)

- Born: April 21, 1928; Tchula, Mississippi, US.
- Died: February 24, 2014 (aged 85)
- Education: Ambrose Vocational High School; Tuskegee University
- Occupations: Author and professor
- Relatives: Eva Rutherford Archer and Chalmers Archer, Sr
- Writing career
- Notable work: Growing Up Black in Rural Mississippi
- Notable awards: Afro-Achievement Award

Chalmers Archer (April 21, 1928 – February 24, 2014) was an African-American author and professor. He wrote a memoir about his early experiences in the segregated South, Growing Up Black in Rural Mississippi, and his experiences as a medic in the Special Forces (United States Army) inspired his book Green Berets in the Vanguard. He received the Afro-Achievement Award in 1994 for distinguished lifetime achievement in education.

== Early life ==
Archer was born in Tchula, Mississippi, one of the six children of Eva Rutherford Archer and Chalmers Archer, Sr. His mother was a teacher and librarian and his father was a veteran of World War I and a farmer. While he was a child, his father and uncles rented four hundred acres called "The Place," where they farmed the land, grew livestock and built smokehouses. He remembers the strong, interdependent black community and how supportive it was for young people growing up.

When he was 12 years old, his family moved to Lexington, Mississippi. He graduated from Ambrose Vocational High School, a segregated school for blacks. Archer noted that it was never intended to be an academic institution because blacks were "not supposed to be intellectually capable of absorbing anything but vocational training," and he noted that the substandard building was not improved until the 1950s after the Supreme Court of the United States had rejected the practice of "separate but equal." Archer had to walk a mile farther to this school than he would have had to if he had been allowed to attend Lexington High School. When Holmes County, Mississippi began providing school bus service, it was only for white students, and Archer was not allowed to ride to school like white neighbors.

After graduating from high school, Archer attended Tuskegee University for a year before he volunteered for the United States Army Air Forces.

== Career ==
Archer served in the United States Army Air Forces for one year before transferring to the United States Army. He served on a medical team as a Master Sergeant Technician during the Korean War. Archer then began training at the Psychological Warfare Center at Ft. Bragg, which become a center for unconventional warfare. He was assigned to clandestine operations in Thailand in 1956 and in Taiwan in 1957. Serving in the newly formed 1st Special Forces Group (United States) he went to Vietnam beginning in 1957. He was a part of a team that suffered some of the first American casualties of the Vietnam War near Nha Trang on October 21, 1957, with the death of Capt. Harry Griffith Cramer, Jr. and injuries to other soldiers. His experiences informed his book, Green Berets in the Vanguard: Inside Special Forces, 1953–1963 (Naval Institute Special Warfare), published in 2001.

In 1967 Archer left the army to complete his education. He graduated from Tuskegee University in 1972, and completed his master's degree in education there in 1974. He received his doctorate in counseling and psychology in 1979 from Auburn University in Alabama. He then completed a year-long post-graduate study at the University of Alabama in Tuscaloosa. He became a professor and college administrator. In 1983, Archer became a professor of counseling and psychology at Northern Virginia Community College. He later served as assistant to the president at Saints Junior College in Lexington, Mississippi, and assistant to the vice president at the Tuskegee Institute.
