= Lawrence Otis Graham =

American lawyer and writer (1961–2021)

- Born: December 25, 1961; Manhattan, New York City, U.S.
- Died: February 19, 2021 (aged 59); Chappaqua, New York, US
- Monuments: Lawrence Otis Graham Garden & Memorial
- Other name: Larry Graham
- Education: Princeton University (BA); Harvard University (JD)
- Occupations: Lawyer; Author
- Organization: Sigma Pi Phi
- Known for: African-American social class nonfiction books and news commentary
- Spouse: Pamela Thomas-Graham

Lawrence Otis Graham (December 25, 1961 – February 19, 2021) was an American attorney, political analyst, cultural influencer and author.

== Early life and education ==
Lawrence Otis Graham was born on December 25, 1961, to Richard and Betty Graham. His parent were born and raised in Memphis, Tennessee where his grandparents owned and operated a trucking company during the Jim Crow era.

When he was 5 years old, Graham's parents decided to purchase a residential family home in a neighborhood in Westchester County, New York. As Graham later described it, "We were the only black family in our all-white upper middle-class White Plains neighborhood in the 1960s and 1970s." This influenced Graham's interest in the pursuit of racial equality and justice.

While his father employed in New York in the field of real estate management, Graham and his older brother were raised in Mount Vernon, New York, and later nearby White Plains, New York. There, Graham attended White Plains High School, where he wrote for the school newspaper, The Orange.

Graham went on to attend Princeton University, where he majored in English, was a member of Whig-Clio and the Carl A. Fields Center (formally, the Third World Center), and was recognized as an active in social-justice issues. After graduating Princeton with a Bachelor of Arts in English, Graham went on to earn a Juris Doctor degree from Harvard Law School in 1988. Afterwards, he practiced as a corporate lawyer in Manhattan.

== Career ==
Lawrence Otis Graham was a corporate lawyer at Weil, Gotshal & Manges and a real estate attorney at Cuddy & Feder as well as a New York Times bestselling author of 14 non-fiction books on the subject of politics, education, race, and class in America. His work has appeared in such publications as The New York Times, Reader's Digest (where he served as a contributing editor), Glamour, and U.S. News & World Report. His book Our Kind of People: Inside America’s Black Upper Class (HarperCollins) was a New York Times, Los Angeles Times and Essence Magazine bestseller, as well as a selection of the Book of the Month Club. A television series based on the book began airing on the Fox network in the fall of 2021.

Graham's book The Senator and The Socialite: the Story of America’s First Black Political Dynasty (HarperCollins) is a biography of U.S. Senator Blanche Bruce, the first black person to serve a full term in the U.S. Senate. Graham is also the author of such books as The Best Companies for Minorities (Penguin Books) and Proversity: Getting Past Face Value (John Wiley & Sons)—two guides on diversity in the workplace—as well as Member of the Club (HarperCollins) which was originally a cover story on New York Magazine, and was later optioned for a feature film by Warner Brothers. Denzel Washington was scheduled to play Graham but the film was never made.

Graham appeared on numerous TV programs including Charlie Rose, The Oprah Winfrey Show, Today Show, The View, Hardball with Chris Matthews, and Good Morning America, and was profiled in USA Today and TIME.

A former adjunct professor at Fordham University, Graham taught African American Studies as well as American Government.

Graham appeared weekly as a political commentator, providing Democratic Party perspectives on News 12 in Westchester.

He was chairman of the Westchester County Police Board and has served on the boards of Red Cross of Westchester, the Boy Scouts of America, Princeton Center for Leadership Training, Jack & Jill Foundation, and Council on Economic Priorities.

Graham was also a trustee of SUNY Purchase College Foundation, University of Pennsylvania School of Veterinary Medicine, the Eaglebrook School; the American Theatre Wing, co-presenters of the Tony Awards and the Horace Mann School in New York City.

== 2000 Congressional campaign ==
During the 2000 United States House of Representatives elections, Graham challenged incumbent Republican Sue W. Kelly for her seat in New York's 19th congressional district. He was unsuccessful.

== Personal life ==
He was Catholic. The wedding of Graham and Pamela Thomas-Graham took place at a Catholic church on Fifth Avenue in midtown Manhattan. "He took his wedding guests by limousine to a reception where the band played Gershwin and Cole Porter," Malcolm Gladwell wrote of the Graham wedding. "And when some of his black friends asked him (Lawrence Otis Graham) when the black music was starting he smiled and told them: "This is it." They lived in Manhattan and in Chappaqua, New York, and had three children.

== Death ==
Graham died in Chappaqua on February 19, 2021. He was buried at Ferncliff Cemetery in Westchester.

On Friday May 19, 2023, Westchester County held a dedication event of the Graham Garden and Memorial in the Kensico Dam Plaza in honor of the life and legacy of Lawrence Otis Graham for his lifelong public service and commitment to racial equity.

== Books ==
Graham's books centralize on African-American social class.

- The Senator and the Socialite: The True Story of America's First Black Dynasty (2006) – This is the true story of America's first black dynasty and follows three generations of a family that rose from slavery to the U.S. Senate. Born a Mississippi slave in 1841, Blanche Kelso Bruce amassed a real estate fortune and became the first black person to serve a full Senate term. He married Josephine Willson, the daughter of a wealthy black doctor, and they broke racial barriers as a Gilded Age high society socialite couple in 1880s Washington, D.C. By hosting white Republicans like President Ulysses S. Grant and notable black people such as Frederick Douglass, Bruce gained appointments under four Presidents, culminating with a US Treasury post which placed his name on all U.S. currency.
- Our Kind of People: Inside America's Black Upper Class (1999) – Debutante cotillions. Million-dollar homes. Summers in Martha's Vineyard and Sag Harbor. Membership in The Links, Jack and Jill, Delta Sigma Theta, Boulé, and Alpha Kappa Alphas. An obsession with the right schools, families, churches, social clubs, and skin complexion. This is the world of the African-American upper class and the focus of the first book written about the black elite by a member of this hard-to-penetrate group. A television series based on the book began airing on the Fox network in the fall of 2021.
- Proversity: Getting Past Face Value (1997)
- Member of The Club: Reflections on Life in a Polarized World (1995) – Member of the Club was Graham's eleventh book, but it was the one that brought national recognition to his essays on race, class and politics. It's known for revealing Graham's experience of leaving his successful corporate law practice at one of New York's largest law firms in order to go undercover as a busboy at a famous Connecticut country club that discriminates against African Americans, Asians, Hispanics, Jews, and women. An excerpt of this book appeared in a cover story for New York magazine.
