= John Langston Gwaltney =

John Langston Gwaltney (September 25, 1928 – August 29, 1998) was an African-American writer and anthropologist focused on African-American culture, best known for his book Drylongso: A Self Portrait of Black America.

== Early life ==
Gwaltney lost his eyesight soon after birth and was the first blind student to attend his local high school in Newark, NJ.

== Academic background ==
Gwaltney earned a BA from Upsala College in 1952, an MA from the New School for Social Research in 1957, and in 1967 a Ph.D. in anthropology from Columbia University, where he won the Ansley Dissertation Award and studied under Margaret Mead, who called him ""a most remarkable man...[who] manages his life and work with extraordinary skill and bravery". His dissertation on river blindness among the Chinantec-speaking people in Oaxaca, Mexico, eventually became his 1970 book Thrice Shy: Cultural Accommodation to Blindness and Other Disasters in a Mexican Community.

He was a professor of anthropology at the Syracuse University.

== Drylongso ==
Drylongso is a collection of Gwaltney's transcriptions of oral interviews with whom he described as "core black people,” ordinary men and women who made up black America. In the interviews, he asked people to define their culture. The book includes a glossary of African American terms, and interviews with 41 people from the Northeast United States. The title is from an African-American word, "drylongso,” which is used to mean "ordinary,” in reference to the social status of the interviewees. In a terse introductory statement chosen by Gwaltney from an interviewee not included in the broader text, factory worker Othman Sullivan says "I think this anthropology is just another way to call me a nigger." The New York Times described it as "The most expansive and realistic exposition of contemporary mainstream black attitudes yet published."

== Bibliography ==
- Thrice Shy: Cultural Accommodation to Blindness and Other Disasters in a Mexican Community Columbia University Press (1970)
- Drylongso: A Self Portrait of Black America, New York: Random House (1980). Reprinted by The New Press, 1993
- The Dissenters: Voices From Contemporary America, Random House (1986)
