= Ann Plato =

African-American educator and author

Ann Plato (c. 1823 – unknown) was a 19th-century African American educator and author. She was the second African-American woman to publish a book in the United States and the first to publish a book of essays and poems. As a young African-American girl writing in the 19th century, Plato has been described as an heir to Phillis Wheatley, who wrote her first published poem at the age of 13 in 1766. There is little biographical information on Plato, and most of her life is known from her only published work, Essays; including Biographies and Miscellaneous Pieces, in Prose and Poetry, which included the preface written by Reverend James W. C. Pennington, an abolitionist leader in Hartford, Connecticut, and a pastor.

== Early years ==
Ann Plato was born around 1820 or 1824 in Hartford, Connecticut, and was most likely the eldest daughter of Henry and Deborah Plato, married in 1824. In the 1828 Hartford City Directory, Henry Plato was listed as a laborer and Deborah Plato was listed as a seamstress, living at 23 Elm Street. Her father was a farmer, born form Narragansett people of Rhode Island. She had one sister and one brother, Gertrude and Benajah, as well as a brother who died young, mentionned in her book.

As is the case with many African-American people who lived in the United States of America during the 19th-century (although this applies to most resident of the United States in that time as well), there exists very little information about her. Most of what is known about her comes from the introduction of her book, written by Reverend James W. C. Pennington, pastor of the Colored Congregational Church of Hartford and the first black man to attend classes at Yale University. Pennington was an important influence for Plato as an educator. In her book's introduction, Pennington wrote of Plato: "My authoress is a colored lady, a member of my church, of pleasing piety and modest worth."

== Teacher and writer ==
Plato taught at the Free African Schools, housed in the Zion Methodist Episcopal Church from 1840 until 1847. She was a member of the Talcott Street Congregational Church in Hartford.

In 1841, at the age of 16, she published her only known book, entitled Essays: Including Biographies and Miscellaneous Pieces in Prose and Poetry. The essays reflected the New England Puritan values of her environment. Topics included "Benevolence," "Education," "Employment," and "Religion." The essays stressed both the importance of education and of leading a pious, industrious life. The book also contained some poetry and biographies of departed female friends and acquaintances.

Some critics from later generations found Plato's essays and poetry to be overly moralizing as well as routine and lacking in originality. Many of them also derided her for not mentioning the issue of slavery in America, as did some of her near contemporaries including Frances Harper and Charlotte Forten Grimke. Plato's one reference to slavery in her book concerns its abolition in the West Indies in 1838 (perhaps a reference to the Slavery Abolition Act 1833 valid throughout the British Empire). She does, however, emphasize the equality of people, regardless of race, a few times in the Essays.

Nothing is known about Plato's life after she stopped teaching in 1847. Furthermore, the year of her death cannot be found. However, Ron Welburn in his book Hartford's Ann Plato and the Native Borders of Identity (SUNY Press, 2015) records that in the 1870 Iowa Federal census a 46-year-old woman called "Miss Plato" who may well be Ann Plato is listed as residing in Decorah Township, Winneshiek County, Iowa. But he is wrong, as the listed woman is white. Furthermore, in property records concerning the Plato family from 1860 onwards, Ann Plato is never mentioned —unlike her sister and brother— as an heir to her father, who died in 1859. This could indicate that she predeceased him.

== Legacy ==
In 1988, Oxford University Press released The Schomburg Library of Nineteenth-Century Black Women Writers with Professor Henry Louis Gates as the general editor of the series. Plato's book was reprinted as a part of this collection.

Trinity College, Connecticut, established the Ann Plato Fellowship in her honor in 1988.

== Quotes ==
"A good education is that which prepares us for our future sphere of action and makes us contented with that situation in life in which God, in his infinite mercy, has seen fit to place us, to be perfectly resigned to our lot in life, whatever it may be." –Ann Plato

"A good education is another name for happiness" –Ann Plato

"Although there are many nations, and many stations in life, yet he watches over us, he has given us immortal souls. Some have white complexions, some are red, like our wandering natives, others have sable or olive complexions. But God hath made of one blood all who dwell upon the face of the earth." –Ann Plato, "Benevolence," Essays: Including Biographies and Miscellaneous Pieces of Prose and Poetry

== Published work ==
Essays: Including Biographies and Miscellaneous Pieces of Prose and Poetry (1841), contains four biographical compositions, 16 very short essays, and 20 poems and is sectioned off into three parts: "Prose," "Biographies," and "Poetry." This collection reflects Plato's work and interest in the antebellum schoolroom as well as her relationship to religion. The prose section reflects Plato’s ideas about education and how Christian principals are infused in the classroom. Plato uses the eulogies of four Black girls, Louisa Sebury, Julia Ann Pell, Eliza Loomis Sherman, and Elizabeth Low, who most likely died of consumption, to present a template on how to live a "legible" righteous life. Finally, her poetry section is a collection of poetry that further considers life, death, and suffering.

== Sources ==
- Bassard, Katherine Clay. Spiritual Interrogations: Culture, Gender, and Community in Early African Women's Writing. Princeton, NJ: Princeton University Press, 1999. ISBN 1-4008-0036-6.
- Shockley, Ann Allen. Afro-American Women Writers 1746–1933: An Anthology and Critical Guide, New Haven, Connecticut: Meridian Books, 1989. ISBN 0-452-00981-2
- Wright, Michelle Diane. Broken Utterances: A Selected Anthology of 19th Century Black Women's Social Thought. Three Sistahs Press, 2007. ISBN 978-0976936510
- Ann Plato's genealogy and archives , FamilySearch
