= Ruth D. Todd =

African-American author

Ruth D. Todd (1878–?) was an African-American writer, who contributed short stories and a serialised novella to The Colored American Magazine, but about whom scant biographical information has been discovered. She is noted for providing an 'interesting counterpoint to... the "domestic fictions" written by her more well-known contemporaries.'

== Life ==
Biographical information about Todd was never printed alongside her published work, so facts about her life have been deduced by research into census records by later scholars. Elizabeth Ammons identified Ruth D. Todd on the 1900 census, described as a 'black servant working in the house of George M. Cooper in Philadelphia.' This record indicates that Todd was born in September 1878 in Virginia. Another census entry, for 1880, suggests that as a young child, she lived in Fairfield, with her parents Edward P. and Mattie Todd. In 1910, Todd is recorded in Philadelphia, working as a self-employed seamstress and living with another Virginian, chambermaid Alice Byers, after which she seems to disappear.

== Writing ==
Between 1902 and 1904, three short stories and one serialised novella by Todd were published in the Colored American Magazine. All of these, writes Amy L. Blair, 'fly in the face of stock "tragic mulatta" storylines.

1903's "The Folly of Mildred", Christine Palumbo-DeSimone has written, touched on a range of issues including: the "call to combat negative stereotypes concerning black women's virtue, the need for black women to help fallen 'sisters', the bitter irony of color discrimination among blacks, [and] the dire consequences for black women of social vices". Palumbo-DeSimone compares Todd's story to Frances Harper's "The Two Offers" (1859), noting that while "The Folly of Mildred" in some ways echoes Harper's much earlier story, it makes "the context of the black female community and its role in women's 'uplift'... more overt."

Carrie Tirado Bramen has also set works by Harper and Todd side by side (Harper's Iola Leroy and Todd's "The Octoroon's Revenge") to argue that the story, "in which a biracial subject's blackness triumphs over her whiteness," serves to unsettle "dominant assumptions about the desirability of whiteness." Bramen argues that rather than telling the "traditional tale of the tragic mulatta", Todd "incorporates a constructivist notion of black identity... with a biologically inherited one... to argue against passing for the "white Negro." Happiness can be found through the (surprisingly) unpainful process of self-outing."

== Works ==
Published in the Colored American Magazine and collected in Short Fiction by Black Women, 1900-1920, ed. Elizabeth Ammons

- "The Octoroon's Revenge" (March 1902)
- "Florence Grey: A Three-Part Story" (August, September, October 1902)
- "The Folly of Mildred: A Race Story with a Moral" (March 1903)
- "The Taming of a Modern Shrew" (March 1904)

== See also ==
- Frances Harper
- The Colored American Magazine
