= Christopher C. Bell =

American author and lecturer

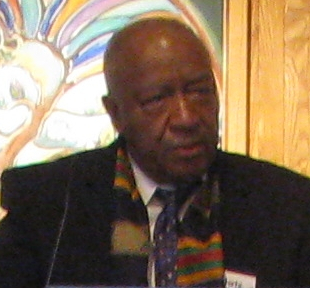
- Christopher C. Bell Jr.
- Born: Christopher C. Bell Jr. May 7, 1933 (age 93); Norfolk, Virginia
- Education: Boston University, Harvard University, Virginia State University
- Known for: Author, poet, Unitarian Universalist
- Notable work: Lt. Williams on the Color Front, The Belief Factor and the White Superiority Syndrome, Soldiers Do Reason Why, The Black Clergy's Misguided Worship Leadership

Christopher C. Bell Jr. (born May 7, 1933) is an American writer, African American author, poet, and lecturer. Bell is best known for his controversial writings on racial issues in the Black church that cause the "White Superiority Syndrome" which is a term he coined. He's a founder of the Muslim American Veterans Association (MAVA).

== Life ==
Bell was born and raised in Campostella, a small suburb of Norfolk, Virginia. He is a retired Major of the U.S. Army. He co-founded the Muslim American Veterans Association in 1997 and later became a Unitarian Universalist and humanist. He retired in Clinton, Maryland, which is in Prince George's County.

== Works ==
His first book Soldiers Do Reason Why . . . published January 19, 1998, is a book of poems he wrote when he was in the military.

His next book, Lt Williams on the Color Front published June 10, 2005, is a fiction story about a platoon leader in an all-white Army Infantry Regiment in Germany. This has some basis in his own life as he was a lieutenant in the 1950s.

The Belief Factor and the White Superiority Syndrome, published January 19, 1998, preceded his more recent book The Black Clergy's Misguided Worship Leadership, are both non-fiction books intended for African-American leaders to stop preaching the Biblical story of Jesus since Jesus is always depicted as white or light-skinned which is unhealthy to the black psyche, according to his theory.
