= Emma Lazarus Federation of Jewish Women's Clubs =

U.S. women's organization

- Founded: 1951; 75 years ago
- Dissolved: 1989; 37 years ago
- Type: Nonprofit
- Headquarters: New York City, NY, U.S.

The Emma Lazarus Federation of Jewish Women's Clubs (ELF) was a progressive secular Jewish women's organization dedicated to advancing the interests of Jewish women, civil rights, opposing antisemitism and racism, and supporting the State of Israel.

== History ==
ELF began as a subdivision of the International Workers Order, growing out of the Emma Lazarus Division of the Women's Division of the Jewish People's Fraternal Order (JFPO). The Emma Lazarus Division was founded in 1944; ELF become an independent organization in 1951 after the JPFO faced legal action after being accused of being a "subversive" organization by the New York Attorney General Nathaniel L. Goldstein. The organization's members were primarily Yiddish-speaking leftist women from immigrant backgrounds. ELF was named after the poet and activist Emma Lazarus. ELF was an officially bilingual English-Yiddish organization.

ELF provided financial support for the Emma Lazarus Day Nursery in Tel Aviv.

ELF was disestablished in 1989.

== Members ==
- June Croll
- Clara Lemlich

== See also ==
- Jewish-American working class
- Jewish feminism
- Jewish left
- McCarthyism
- McCarthyism and antisemitism
