= Fauset =

Fauset is a surname. Notable people with the surname include:

- Arthur Fauset (1899–1983), American activist, anthropologist, folklorist, and educator
- Crystal Bird Fauset (1893–1965), American politician and civil rights activist
- Jessie Redmon Fauset (1882–1961), American writer
