= Edythe Mae Gordon =

African american writer

- Born: Edythe Mae Chapman c. 1897; Washington, D.C., United States
- Died: 1980 (aged 82–83)
- Education: Boston University (BS)
- Occupation: Writer
- Spouse: Eugene Gordon (m. 1916; div. 1942)
- Writing career
- Genres: short stories, poetry
- Movement: Harlem Renaissance

Edythe Mae Gordon (c. 1897 – 1980) was an African-American writer of short stories and poetry during the era of the Harlem Renaissance. Gordon primarily published her work in the Quill Club, a Boston-based publication founded by her husband Eugene Gordon and other figures of the Harlem Renaissance such as Helene Johnson and Dorothy West. The most well known example of her work was published after her death, Selected Works of Edythe Mae Gordon, as part of a project to support and reintroduce African-American women writers between 1910 and 1940, written by Henry Louis Gates Jr., Jennifer Burton, and Lorraine Elena Roses.

== Personal life ==
Edythe Mae Chapman was born in Washington, D.C., likely June 4 sometime in the period 1895–1900; the date is uncertain because the existing documents differ on her birth year. She was raised by members of her mother's family, surnamed Bicks; nothing is known of her father. She was educated at M Street School (later renamed Dunbar High), a public school, and graduated in 1916. M Street School employed literary figures Anna J. Cooper, Carter G. Woodson, and Jessie Redmon Faust during Gordon's education and may have influenced her writing. On January 10, 1916, she married Eugene Gordon, then a student at Howard University and later a writer for the Boston Post and eventual founder of the Saturday Night Quill Club and the publication, Saturday Evening Quill. By 1919 they had moved to Boston but had ten separate addresses across ten years of attending college and publishing; Eugene and Edythe separated in 1932 and divorced in 1942.

In 1926, Gordon enrolled as an undergraduate at Boston University. She graduated in 1934 with a B.S. degree in religious education and social services; a year later she earned her master's degree from the university's School of Social Services, a then-rare accomplishment for an African-American woman. Gordon's thesis for her master's focused on the status of Black women, and is published in her anthology Selected Works of Edythe Mae Gordon

After Edythe divorced Eugene, she effectively disappears from the literary world. The last public records of her life were a 1938 transcript to Boston University, a note with two poems published in Negro Voices in 1938, and her 1942 petition for divorce from Probate and Family Court. Her disappearance and its relation to her divorce are unknown. There is little information about Gordon after her 1942 divorce. She died in 1980.

== Writing ==
In 1925, Gordon's husband Eugene organized an African-American literary group, the Saturday Evening Quill Club, out of which grew a literary magazine, Saturday Evening Quill, of which he became the editor. Published three times a year, Quill contains most of the surviving specimens of Gordon's writing. Her first piece for Quill was a 1928 short story, "Subversion." It was listed among the year's distinguished stories by the O. Henry Award prize committee, which at the time rarely noticed works by non-white authors. Gordon would go on to publish two more short stories and a dozen poems in Quill. She also published two poems in the 1938 anthology Negro Voices, edited by Beatrice Murphy.

Gordon's fiction focuses on the unhappy lives of urban African-American couples, challenging some of the era's social norms. Her poems are lyrical odes to love that take their metaphors from nature.

A compilation of Gordon's work, Selected Works of Edythe Mae Gordon, was published in 1996. This compilation includes a total of seventeen works, three short stories and thirteen poems, with her Master's thesis, "The Status of the Negro Woman in the United States 1619-1865" in the center of the publication. That same year, "Subversion" and another story, "If Wishes Were Horses", were republished in the anthology Harlem's Glory: Black Women Writing, 1900-1950.

== Short stories ==
=== "Hostess" ===
This story follows the life of Mazie, a woman in a stable yet boring marriage who has an affair with a saxophone player. The musician leaves Mazie when she becomes pregnant, and Mazie returns to her husband only to discover she has been replaced by her best friend. The story ends with Mazie committing suicide. Analysis of the story suggests a message "articulating the limits of Mazie's options for self-actualization in the early twentieth century."

The story begins with a man named Tom at a dance asking to marry her but Mazie takes it as a joke. Mazie is a hostess at Eddie Mason's night club and dances with many people. Mazie's death is foreshadowed by Mazie worryingly checking her bottle of sleeping medicine and remembering that an overdose would be fatal. Later in bed, Mazie thinks about how mistaken she was to leave her former husband, Jack, to pursue "Saxophone" Bill, as her husband had given her "everything- a house, expensively furnished, luxurious clothes, jewels." While he supplied her materially and was a devoted husband, he did not fulfill her on an emotional level. Despite her best friend Lettie's warning, Mazie feels certain she deserves to enjoy her life and be happy, propelling her to pursue Bill without care to her husband. Eventually, her and Bill runaway together but Bill's temperament is unfit for working and Mazie runs out of money eventually. When she is destitute, Bill disappears and Mazie picks up her current job as a hostess. While ruminating in bed, she determines to take her husband back. While she knows she's become older, she applies makeup and feels confident she can get her husband back.

When she finds Jack, he's preparing for lunch and cold to her enthusiasm. Mazie finds that the table is set for two and quickly learns her friend Lettie and Jack married one another just yesterday. The story ends with Mazie at her hostess job, saying yes to a dance and a drink with Tom. She slips her sleeping medicine in her drink as they toast and dies.

=== "If Wishes Were Horses" ===
This story follows Fred Pomeroy, an emaciated and impoverished writer and fabric story clerk. Pomeroy goes to a fortune teller, who tells him that his will "realize her desires." At this point, the perspective shifts to Pomeroy's dreaming wife. Pomeroy's wife is dreaming of solo flight. When she wakes up, her husband is dead beside her. She collects fifty thousand from life insurance and goes on to travel abroad, fulfilling her dreams.

=== "Subversion" ===
This story follows John Marley, a sick and impoverished artist. Marley is a music teacher struggling with the issue of his failing health scaring away students who fear contracting his illness, making his health worse due to his inability to pay for medicine. Marley's marriage was happy before he became sick, and he becomes convinced he will survive his illness and fix his marriage if he can only get more students. During Thanksgiving, over several coincidences, Marley realizes his wife and best friend, Charlie, are having an affair. During the Thanksgiving dinner, Marley looks over at his son and sees the features of his best friend. This detail collapses Marley's hope for a return to a happy marriage or any happiness at all, and he asks his best friend to be kind to his wife and son when he passes away. This comment makes Charlie and his wife visibly uncomfortable.

=== Themes ===
Themes in Gordon's short stories include capitalism, particularly the damage that capitalist mindsets can have on the health of interpersonal relationships. The protagonists of her short stories are unable to achieve happiness and often doomed to a tragic and lonely ending.

== Poetry ==
=== "April Night" ===
"April Night" shares the common themes of Gordon's poetry. This poem is short, with four stanzas, focusing on ephemeral beauty and drawing comparisons between human desire and nature and the beauty of the natural world.

=== "Buried Deep" ===
This short poem of a single stanza addresses physical and spiritual death and the speaker's desire for the person the poem is addressing to rejoice over their grave with dance and spread flowers rather than mourn the speaker's death.

=== "Cradled Gifts" ===
This single stanza poem centers the speaker's desire push past their lover's closed off persona and hold this person intimately to her chest.

=== "Elysium" ===
"Elysium" is a single stanza poem that directly addresses the listener as "beloved" and "you." The poem is focused on love that guides one through difficulty and darkness through one's life while also including imagery of natural beauty in the world, equating breezes through the trees to the sound of violins. The poem ends with the speaker's desire for the speaker and their beloved to return to "the land of dreams" and satisfy their desires through relishing over old memories.

=== "I See You" ===
In this single stanza poem the speaker directly addresses the reader as "you," referring to them as the receiver of her love. The poem compares love to a rose and as the "essence" of one's soul. The speaker invites the reader to pick up the rose rather than continuing to hold onto a wilted lily, and luxuriate in the beauty and smell of the lovely rose instead.

=== "I Understand" ===
This poem is one of her few poems that are sorrowful and preoccupied on lost love. This poem is a single stanza and focuses on the pain of being barren, comparing the speaker's sterile life to that of a picture of the Madonna with a baby Jesus held to her chest. The speaker feels as though being sterile is why her lover has left her. This is one of the few poems where there is a clear gendered pronoun in reference to a lover. The speaker realizes that her lover continuing to glance at the Madonna image should have been a sign to her that he would never be satisfied to only have her, and not have children.

=== "Let Your Rays" ===
This single stanza poem of eight lines is addressed to the sun, demanding the sun to pour through the speaker and melt their frozen heart. The poem invokes the beauty of nature, particularly the sun, and its ability to heal inner brokenness and salve wounds to one's soul.

=== "Love Me" ===
This short poem focuses on love and the conflict between logic and passion. The speaker is "commanding" that the reader, addressed in second person, love her, yet she understands that she cannot control whether other people choose passion and choose to love her.

=== "One Summer's Day" ===
Similar to "I Understand," this poem focuses on the loss of love. Incorporating elements of natural beauty and personifying the concept of love, the speaker reflects on walking through nature with Love. After a bit they grow tired, and when the speaker wakes up she realizes she is alone.

=== "Sonnet for June" ===
This short poem of four lines is meditative and peaceful reflection on the power of nature and the beauty of a June day, referring to being in nature as a daily worship.

=== "Tribute" ===
This three stanza poem addresses the beauty of a lover addressed in second person. The poem particularly focuses on nakedness as authenticity and the bronze skin color of the speaker's lover. The poem uses comparisons to the natural world, such as palm leaves and wind, to exemplify the beauty found in lovers. Love is discussed as a source of spiritual fulfillment.

=== "Worship" ===
`This single stanza poem addresses the beauty of the natural world as a means of God's splendor. The poem addresses birds, trees, dewdrops, and sunlight, and wind as sources of inspiring beauty.

=== "Young Love" ===
This single stanza poem involves hair, natural beauty, and the concept of young love. The speaker addresses her lover in second person, calling upon the reader to kiss her wreath of Jasmine and make promises of eternal love.

=== Themes ===
Gordon's poetry is focused on romantic desire and nature, often using nature to express the spiritual fulfillment found from romantic love. Gordon's poetry is described as invoking "the divine, emotional, loving without embarrassment, and loving unencumbered by race or convention."

== Thesis ==
Gordon wrote her Masters thesis for Social Work at Boston University about Black women in the United States, providing a detailed history and analysis of how Black women have been treated in the country. Titled "The Status of the Negro Woman in the United States 1619-1865," this thesis delves through the colonial times to the end of the Civil War, noting how laws have applied to the Black body and the ways Black women are oppressed both as women and as Black people. Gordon argues that the conditions of the African American woman was that of "semi-slavery" and exploitation.
