= Lewis Grandison Alexander =

American writer and actor (1898–1945)

Lewis Grandison Alexander (July 4, 1898 – November 25, 1945) was an African-American poet, actor, playwright, and costume designer who lived in Washington, D.C., and had strong ties to the Harlem Renaissance period in New York. Alexander focused most of his time and creativity on poetry, and it is for this that he is best known.

Hokku

I
Life goes by moving,
Up and down a chain of moods
Wanting what’s nothing.

II
My soul is the wind
Dashing down fields of Autumn:
O, too swift to sing.

III
I shall spend my moods
Like a rose discards leaves
And die without moods.

IV
My ears burn for speech
And you lie cold and silent.
Supinely cruel:

V
Look at the white moon
The sphinx does not question more.
Turn away your eyes.

VI
The poetry of life?
NO, the picture of my dreams
Flashing on my heart.

== Early life, education and style ==
Lewis Alexander was born on July 4, 1898, in Washington, D.C. As a child, he was educated in the Washington public school system. Little biographical information is available on Alexander until, at the age of 17, he began writing poetry; he took special interest in Japanese forms including haiku (then called hokku), and tanka. Alexander went on to study at Howard University in Washington, D.C., where he was an active member of the Howard Players, the school's theater group. He later continued his studies at the University of Pennsylvania. Alexander expressed a special interest in Japanese forms and he is one of few Black American poets to write in these styles. "The FIRE!! poems of Hughes, Helene Johnson, and Lewis Alexander deserve recognition as important modernist verse because they make key forms of modernist poetry – free verse, imagism, and dramatic monologue – into racial critique"

== Poetry and publication ==
Alexander's notoriety as a poet can best be exemplified by his publications in many popular journals and magazines. Throughout his career, he was published regularly with other major Harlem Renaissance figures such as Langston Hughes, Gwendolyn Bennett, and Countee Cullen. He was published several times in Opportunity: Journal of Negro Life, a popular literary magazine associated with the Harlem Renaissance edited by Charles S. Johnson, from 1925 to 1929. The first of these appearances occurred in a trio of African-themed poems alongside poems by Langston Hughes and Claude McKay. Alexander's poem "Enchantment" was published in Alain Locke's famous anthology, The New Negro. Alexander's most popularly anthologized work, a short poem entitled "Negro Woman", was published in Opportunity at least twice and appears in multiple anthologies. In 1927, Alexander, along with many other poets (most notably Langston Hughes) and writers set out to create a literary quarterly expressing the Black experience in America. Unfortunately, Fire!! only produced one issue due to the burning of the magazine's headquarters. In this one issue, Alexander published two poems: "Little Cinderella", a poem often thought to be about a young, black prostitute, and another short verse entitled "Streets".

Alexander was also one of the first non-Japanese poets to write multiple sets of both haiku (then called hokku) and tanka. He published an article on the topic of Japanese hokku, drawing on the work of John Gould Fletcher, along with fourteen original English-language hokku, in the December 1923 edition of The Crisis. Alexander followed this up with collections of hokku in Opportunity: A Journal of Negro Life (Sep. 1925) and Black Opals (Christmas 1927), and a set of eight tanka in the Countee Cullen edited anthology Carolling Dusk (1927).

Alexander was also published outside of the United States. In October 1926, he appeared in a special issue of The Palms, a poetic journal based in Guadalajara, Mexico. This special issue, edited by Countee Cullen, included Alexander's "A Collection of Japanese Hokku" (reprinted from earlier collections) and the poem "Dream Song".

== Contribution to the Harlem Renaissance ==
Although Alexander did not live in Harlem, he was an active participant in the Harlem Renaissance movement. His location outside of Harlem helped to spread the inventive new thinking that flourished at the time in New York City. After writing extensively in Washington, Alexander moved around the country and joined whichever literary circle that existed in his new city. In Philadelphia, he was associated with a group of young writers who were commonly published in the small-time Black Opals literary magazine. In Boston, he appeared in the Saturday Evening Quill.

Alexander was influential at the University of North Carolina, where he served as honorary editor for special issues of The Carolina Magazine, the official literary publication of the students of the university, which featured black poets and writers. With Alexander's help (he selected works from Crisis and Opportunity writing and poetry contest), the magazine continued to publish Negro Poetry Numbers and Negro Play Numbers. The continued issues of Negro Poetry Numbers were dedicated to Alexander.

== Theater ==
Although he is best known for his work as a poet, Alexander was also a playwright, actor, and costume designer.

After participating in the theater while attending Howard University, Alexander joined the play writers circle of Washington, D.C. There, he directed all the plays put on the Randall Community Center in Washington as well as all the plays put on by the Ira Aldridge Players. He studied and toured with the Ethiopian Art Theatre. During their 1923 tour, in which they opened for Broadway, Alexander appeared in Oscar Wilde's Salome and William Shakespeare's The Comedy of Errors.
