= Nellie Rathbone Bright =

American educator, poet, and author

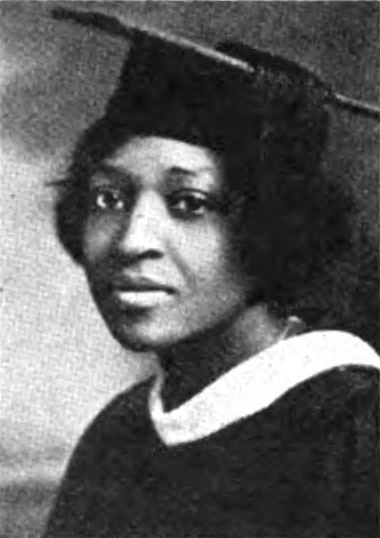
- Nellie Rathbone Bright in 1923
- Born: March 28, 1898; Savannah, Georgia, US
- Died: February 7, 1977 (aged 78); Philadelphia, Pennsylvania
- Burial place: Eden Cemetery; Collingdale, Pennsylvania
- Education: University of Pennsylvania (BA 1923)
- Occupations: Educator, poet, author
- Years active: 1935 – 1952

Nellie Rathbone Bright (March 28, 1898 – February 7, 1977) was an American educator, poet, and author. She taught in Philadelphia public schools, becoming a principal in 1935 and serving until her retirement in 1952. She inspired generations of African American students.

During the 1920s she was part of a literary group known as the Black Opals. In 1927–1928, together with Arthur Fauset, she co-edited Black Opals, a literary magazine named after a line from a poem in its first issue. Although it was published in Philadelphia, the magazine was considered part of the larger artistic world of the Harlem Renaissance. Similar literary groups and magazines sprang up in Boston and Washington, DC.

Born in Savannah, Georgia to parents who were college graduates and professionals, Bright and her family moved to Philadelphia, Pennsylvania in the early 1910s during the Great Migration. Her father was an Episcopal priest and her mother a teacher and social worker. Bright completed most of her education in Philadelphia, graduating from the University of Pennsylvania. She devoted most of her life to her students, as a teacher and a principal.

== Early life ==
Nellie Rathbone Bright was born in Savannah, Georgia on March 28, 1898, the only child of Reverend Richard Bright and his wife Nellie (Jones) Bright. The girl was named after her mother and maternal grandmother; her middle name was in honor of her godmother, a white woman named Caroline Rathbone who was a family friend and social activist.

Bright's father was born on Saint Thomas in what was then the Dutch West Indies. He received his education at St. Augustine Collegiate Institute in Raleigh, North Carolina. He went on to graduate studies, earning a divinity degree from the General Theological Seminary in New York in 1891. Upon graduation, he was ordained as an Episcopal priest. Rev. Bright was called to the Episcopal diocese of Savannah, the first black Episcopal priest to be appointed in the diocese.

Bright's mother, Nellie, was from Louisville, Kentucky. She had been educated in Europe to escape the racism of the South. After her return, she became a teacher. Shortly after their arrival in Savannah, in 1892 the Brights established the first private kindergarten and primary school for blacks in Georgia.

Around 1910, the Brights moved to Philadelphia, Pennsylvania, where Rev. Bright had accepted an appointment. The industrial city was one of the northern destinations for tens of thousands of black migrants from the rural South, attracted to its jobs and other opportunities in the Great Migration. Bright's congregation aided newcomers to adjust to urban life.

== Education and career ==
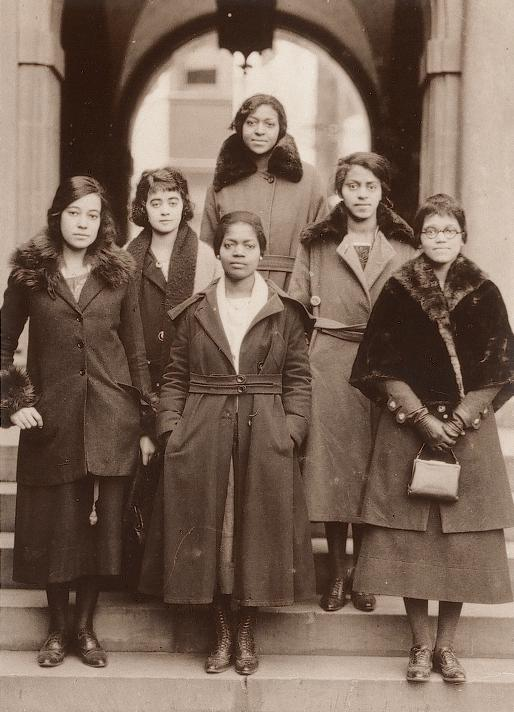
Members at 1921 national convention, hosted by Gamma chapter (l to r): front, Virginia Margaret Alexander, Julia Mae Polk, Sadie Tanner Mossell; row 2, Anna R. Johnson, Nellie Rathbone Bright, Pauline Alice Young

While at the University of Pennsylvania, Bright was a charter member of the Gamma chapter of the university's first black sorority, Delta Sigma Theta. Other members of her chapter included Virginia M. Alexander, who later became a physician and founded the Aspiranto Health Home; Anna Roselle Johnson, a social worker, educator, civic activist, and wife of the famed chemist Percy Lavon Julian; and Sadie Tanner Mossell, the first woman to receive a law degree from the University of Pennsylvania Law School. Bright also chartered the Xi Sigma chapter of Delta Sigma Theta, together with ten other women.

Bright also studied at the Sorbonne and University of Oxford, as well as studying art at the University of Vermont and at the Berkshire School of Art in Massachusetts. She traveled extensively as an adult and was a landscape painter.

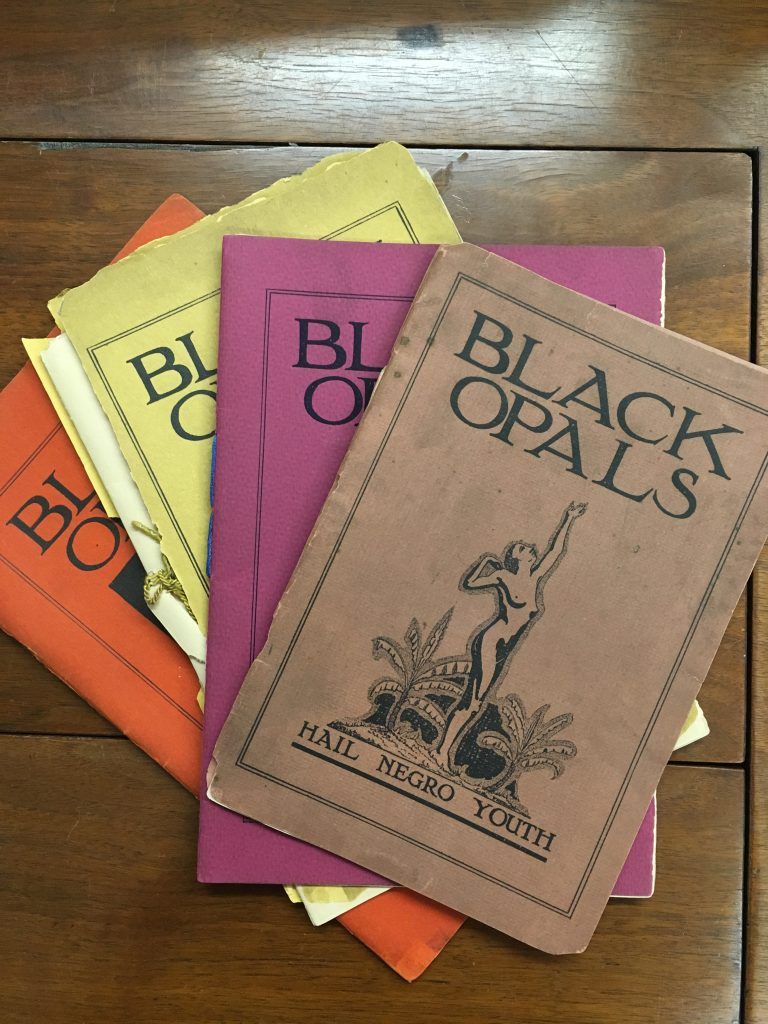
Black Opals literary journals, co-founded by Bright and Arthur Fauset

After her graduation, Bright worked as a teacher in Philadelphia public schools. Additionally, she became active in a group of young Black intellectuals in the city in the 1920s. She co-founded a literary journal called Black Opals with Arthur Fauset. The magazine drew its name from a line from a poem "Longings," published in the first issue in 1927. It read "... flame like fire in black opals." Bright and Mae V. Cowdery, another poet from Philadelphia, both had poems published in the first issue; they were praised by Countee Cullen, the new literary editor of Opportunity, a journal in New York. Their literary group became known by the same name; these young people in Philadelphia were typical of literary groups that arose in numerous East Coast cities, inspired by the Harlem Renaissance. Bright and Fauset intended their journal as a quarterly but ceased publication in 1928 after only three issues, as the journal failed to gain a large enough readership.

In 1935, Bright was appointed principal of the segregated Joseph E. Hill School in Philadelphia. One of her students, future author and history professor Allen Ballard, said that she was a strict principal who instilled a love for and pride of African American history and culture in her students:

We were all Nellie Bright's children and she expected great things from us. And so she created a wonderful school. A landscape painter and writer ... Miss Bright saw to it that the Hill School was immaculate and vibrantly decorated with pictures and posters. She and her staff made the achievements of blacks a cause for year-round celebration. Blackboards and walls were crowded with posters of Harriet Tubman, Toussaint L'Ouverture, Frederick Douglass, Alexander Dumas, and the great black Russian writer Pushkin.

Bright served as a principal of three different schools before she retired in 1952. During her career, Bright also served on more than fifteen civic boards or organizations directed toward improving schools and neighborhoods; she was concerned about the whole life of her students and their world. She worked to gain improvements in city health services, and to facilitate "cooperation among diverse members of society."

== Later years ==
After her retirement, Bright taught in-service courses to teachers on Black history until 1959, under direction of the Board of Education. Classes were held at the Fellowship House in Philadelphia (now located at Fellowship Farm in Pottstown, Pennsylvania). It is an interracial organization dedicated to learning about and understanding cultural and ethnic differences.

In 1972, Bright co-authored America: Red, White, Black, Yellow with her longtime collaborator Arthur Fauset. This history book for children and young adults focused on the history of minorities in the United States.

Bright died on February 7, 1977. She is buried in Eden Cemetery in Collingdale, Pennsylvania.

== Personal life ==
In addition to her educational and writing pursuits, Bright was a landscape painter in oils. She spoke French and Spanish fluently.

Bright traveled extensively in her lifetime, spending time in both the Caribbean and Europe.

Bright remained single her entire life.
