= Mae Virginia Cowdery =

American poet (1909–1948)

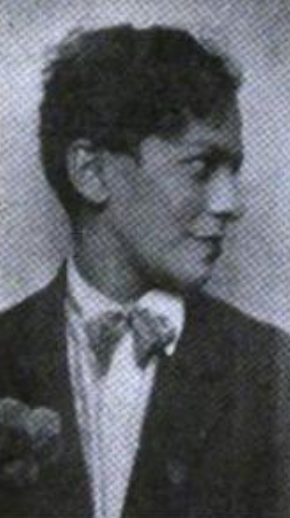
- Cowdery, from a 1928 publication
- Born: January 10, 1909; Philadelphia, Pennsylvania, U.S.
- Died: November 2, 1948 (aged 39); New York City, U.S.
- Cause of death: Suicide
- Education: Philadelphia High School for Girls; Pratt Institute
- Occupation: Poet
- Father: Lemuel Cowdery

Mae Virginia (or Valentine) Cowdery (January 10, 1909 – November 2, 1948) was an African-American poet based in Philadelphia, Pennsylvania. She is considered part of the wide-ranging artistic efforts inspired by the Harlem Renaissance in New York City.

== Biography ==
Cowdery was born in 1909 in Philadelphia, Pennsylvania. She was the only child of upwardly mobile parents; her mother was a social worker and an assistant director of the Bureau for Colored Children (later the Bureau for Child Care); her father Lemuel Cowdery was a caterer and United States postal worker. Cowdery discovered her talent for poetry as a child. She graduated from the prestigious Philadelphia High School for Girls and attended Pratt Institute in New York to study fashion design but did not graduate. While attending Pratt Institute in Brooklyn, she frequented night places in Greenwich Village.

While still in high school, Cowdery published three poems in 1927 in Black Opals, a new literary journal founded that year. It was co-founded in 1927 by Arthur Fauset, a folklorist and teacher, and Nellie Rathbone Bright, a teacher and poet who later published four novels. They were part of a literary and intellectual group in Philadelphia who also became known as the Black Opals.

Cowdery's poem in the first issue, as well as one of Bright's, were among pieces to win praise from Countee Cullen, the new literary editor of Opportunity, a larger journal based in Harlem, New York. Groups such as the Black Opals were being founded in other East Coast cities, including Washington, DC, and Boston. The group did not succeed in building a large enough audience for the journal, and published it only into 1928.

Cowdery won first prize in a 1927 poetry contest from The Crisis for her poem "Longings"; another poem won the Krigwa Prize. During the late 1920s, she established her reputation by publishing in journals, magazines and anthologies. She did not publish her own collection of poetry until her book We Lift Our Voices: And Other Poems (1936), and was one of the few African-American women poets in the first half of the 20th century to publish a book of her work. "It was critically well received."

She died by suicide in New York City in 1948, at the age of 39.

== Works ==
- "Farewell" (1929, poem)
- We Lift Our Voices: And Other Poems, 1936
