= McBrown =

McBrown is a surname. Notable people with the surname include:

- Gertrude P. McBrown (1898–1989), American poet, playwright, actress, educator, and stage director
- Nana Ama McBrown (born 1977), Ghanaian actress, TV presenter, and music writer
