= Gertrude Schalk =

Writer and editor (1906–1977)

Gertrude Schalk (1906 – April 23, 1977), also known as Toki Schalk Johnson, was a twentieth-century African-American writer, columnist, clubwoman, and newspaper editor. Although she lived and worked outside of New York City, her early fiction is sometimes considered as part of the broader Harlem Renaissance literary movement.

== Early life ==
Lillian Schalk was born in Boston, Massachusetts, daughter of Theodore O. Schalk and Mary Wilkerson Schalk. She had a sister, Bali, and two brothers, Theodore and George. She changed her first name to Gertrude as a young woman.

== Career ==
Four short stories by Gertrude Schalk appeared in the Saturday Evening Quill, a publication the Saturday Evening Quill Club, a black literary organization cofounded in Boston by Eugene Gordon, of which Schalk was an original member. Those stories included "The Black Madness" (1928), which was also featured in The Best American Short Stories anthology for 1928, and "The Red Cape" (1929).

Schalk was also editor of Sunburst magazine, and later women's editor of the Pittsburgh Courier, a major African-American newspaper. She had a regular column, "Toki Types", which ran in the society pages until 1974.

In 1961, Schalk became one of the first black members (along with Hazel Garland) of the Women's Press Club of Pittsburgh. She won the club's annual Mary Shine Award in 1969. In 1970, she was elected president of that organization.

== Personal life ==
Gertrude Schalk married John Wesley Johnson III, a journalist from Ohio, in 1946, and was widowed when he died in 1969. While living in Pittsburgh, she founded that city's chapter of Jack and Jill of America. She also helped to found the Pittsburgh chapter of Girlfriends Incorporated.

For the last five years of her life, she lived "with much joie de vivre" in a nursing home in Detroit, Michigan, where her sister lived. She died in 1977, age 71.
