= Alvira Hazzard =

American writer

- Born: December 11, 1898; North Brookfield, Massachusetts, U.S.
- Died: January 10, 1953 (aged 54); Boston, Massachusetts, U.S.
- Other name: Elvira Hazzard
- Occupations: Writer, playwright, poet

Alvira Hazzard (December 11, 1898 – January 10, 1953) was an American writer, poet, educator, and playwright, based in Boston but associated with the Harlem Renaissance.

== Biography ==
Hazzard was born in North Brookfield, Massachusetts, the daughter of John Henry Hazzard and Rosella W. Curry Hazzard. She graduated from Worcester Normal School.

Hazzard taught school in Boston as a young woman, and was a clerk at Boston City Hospital. She was a founding member of the Saturday Evening Quill club and published in the club's journal. She wrote plays, adapted plays, acted in plays, and wrote about Boston theatre.

Hazzard attended the Opportunity Awards Dinner in New York in 1927. She was publicity chair for the Boston branch of the NAACP, and president of the Health Guild of the Boston Tuberculosis Association. She was also a competitive amateur golfer. She died in 1953, at the age of 54, from leukemia.

== Publications ==
=== Plays ===
- Polly Wakes Up (produced by Maud Cuney Hare in 1928)
- Mother Liked It (1928)
- Little Heads (1929)

=== Poems ===
- "The Penitent" (1928)
- "Predestination" (1929)
- "To My Grandmother" (1929)
- "Beyond" (1929)

=== Articles and short stories ===
- "Another Lochinvar" (1927, short story)
- "Jason Gets a Jolt" (1927, short story)
- "Rejection Slip" (1928, short story)
- "Oatmeal Cookies" (1928, short story)
- "Blind Alley" (1929, short story)
- "Boston Little Theater Movement in 4th Year" (1930, article)
- "Cavalcade of Colored Women Invade Boston" (1939, article)
