= June Croll =

- Born: Sonia Croll; 1901; Odessa, Kherson, Russian Empire
- Died: 1967 (aged 65–66)
- Other names: June Croll Gordon; June Gordon; Mrs. Langston Hughes (alias)
- Political party: Communist USA
- Spouse: Eugene Gordon (m. 1942)

June Croll (1901-1967) was a U.S. labor organizer most active during the interwar years.

== Biography ==
June Croll was born Sonia Croll in 1901 in Odessa in Ukraine, at the time part of the Russian Empire. During her girlhood, she emigrated illegally to Canada and then to the United States, where by the age of 12 she was working in the garment industry in New York City. It is not certain when she changed her name from Sonia to June.

Croll became involved in trade unionism, organizing textile and millinery workers and leading strikes. She joined the Communist Party and by 1935 was secretary of the Anti-Nazi Federation. She later became the executive director of the Emma Lazarus Federation of Jewish Women's Clubs (ELF). The ELF was a progressive organization formed by Clara Lemlich and others to provide relief to victims of World War 2, to combat antisemitism, and to provide educational programs on Jewish identity and women's rights. Croll still held this job at the time of her death in 1967.

Her communist beliefs and labor activism made her a target of McCarthyism. An attempt was made to deport her, and she was called to testify before the House Un-American Activities Committee.

She died in 1967.

== Personal life ==
Croll married Carl Reeve, the executive chairman of the Communist Party of Pennsylvania and Delaware. Reeve was the son of labor organizer Ella Reeve Bloor. Croll later divorced him and had a long relationship with African-American journalist Eugene Gordon, starting in the 1930s. She traveled to the Soviet Union with Gordon in 1937-38. She married Gordon after he divorced his first wife in 1942. At times she used the alias "Mrs. Langston Hughes", possibly to confuse U.S. immigration authorities.
