= Arthur Fauset =

American civil rights activist and anthropologist

Arthur Huff Fauset (January 20, 1899 – September 2, 1983) was an American civil rights activist, anthropologist, folklorist, and educator. Born in Flemington, New Jersey, he grew up in Philadelphia, where he attended Central High School.

== Family background ==
Fauset was born on January 20, 1899, and was the middle child of three children in an interracial family in Flemington, New Jersey. His father, Redmon Fauset, was African American and likely of mixed race. He was a minister in the African Methodist Episcopal Church. Redmon Fauset's second wife, a white woman named Bella, was born into a Jewish family. Bringing three children from her first marriage, she converted to Christianity to marry Fauset. Redmon Fauset had seven children by his first marriage, before his wife Annie (née Seamon) died.

As a person of known mixed race, Arthur Fauset never identified fully with either of his parents' ethnic groups as a child or adult. According to the hypodescent practices of U.S. society, he and his siblings were considered Negro (or Black). They were people of color.

Both Redmon and Bella Fauset were dedicated to the importance of education. Redmon believed that writing was an essential discipline. Bella was a devout integrationist, believing firmly in social integration and she encouraged the children in their schooling after Redmon died when Arthur was four years old. In his adult life, in contrast to his father, Fauset broke away from religion and identified as a "free thinker."

== Education ==
Fauset attended Central High School, a top academic high school for boys in Philadelphia; he studied further at the Philadelphia School of Pedagogy for Men, where he received his teaching credentials, and started his first teaching position in 1918. In the mid-1920s, he took the principal's merit exams, scoring so highly that he qualified for promotion.

He began studying and practicing anthropology. He was mentored by writer Alain Locke, who also became a friend and emphasized an academic approach to guide his activism. Fauset earned a B.A. in 1921 and an M.A. in 1924 from the University of Pennsylvania; after teaching for years and pursuing advanced studies, he earned a Ph.D. in 1942 from Penn.

Fauset pursued education in order to feed and develop his intellect. He was discouraged because of his race from ambitions to teach at the university level. People of color had fewer opportunities in academia, but some men completed advanced degrees and obtained some college positions. Fauset taught and was principal at Joseph Singerly Public School, an elementary school in North Philadelphia, for 20 years.

== Political activism and marriage ==
In 1931, Fauset married civil rights activist and race relations specialist Crystal Dreda Bird. Among other political activities, she would become the first female African American state legislator in 1938, based out of Philadelphia.

In 1935, Arthur Fauset became chairman of the Philadelphia Sponsoring Committee for the newly formed National Negro Congress (NNC), an organization committed to political and economic empowerment. Fauset was elected vice president at the NCC's first national meeting. For the next three years in Philadelphia, he helped lead African American efforts for better jobs, housing, state anti-lynching legislation, and enforcement of Pennsylvania's Equal Rights Bill of 1935.

Arthur and Crystal Fauset eventually separated and finalized their divorce in 1944.

== Folklore ==
Arthur Huff Fauset was very interested in folklore and conducted fieldwork in the South, the Caribbean, and Nova Scotia to learn these tales. During the time of the Harlem Renaissance, he brought awareness to African American folklore through tales, songs, conundrums, and jokes. Faust was also known for letting African American voices speak for themselves, telling them the way that they were told to him rather than imposing his own voice and theories on them.

This approach led many to read and appreciate his writing. His first piece appeared in The Crisis while he was a college student at the University of Pennsylvania with his short story "The Tale Of The North Carolina Woods" in January 1922. He aimed to cultivate and revive African American culture through these tales and reestablish a sense of pride that had long been abandoned. The only time when Fauset did input his own theories and ideas about these stories was in his first book Folklore from Nova Scotia, published in 1931. In this book, Fauset examines African American folklore through the diffusion model, which looks at how information spreads throughout a population. He spoke about how African American folklore had changed over time, and especially how it has integrated folklore from other cultures (such as Irish or French). Fauset believed that this was not because Negroes had assimilated to the dominant culture of their province, but because they had integrated aspects of the dominant culture through the process of contributing to the dominant culture.

During his time in Nova Scotia in the summer of 1923, Fauset found that hardly any of the traditional stories told by Negroes in the United States were told in Nova Scotia, and the stories told in Nova Scotia were unheard of in the United States.

It was as though each group only had small pieces of a larger puzzle and needed help in organizing and bringing all of their stories together to get a better sense of their whole culture. This is where Fauset helped, in tying together and spreading these stories to better educate all Negroes of their heritage. However, this was not the only role he played; Fauset also used these stories to debunk stereotypes of African Americans. For example, many Negroes in Nova Scotia told him that they would go down to visit the states if the weather was not as hot there. This debunked the stereotype that all Negroes enjoyed and were drawn to warmer climates, giving them a more authentic identity at a time when they were being portrayed as minstrels in the United States.

== Accomplishments ==
Fauset was an active figure in the Harlem Renaissance. His older half-sister, Jessie Redmon Fauset (1882–1961), was better known as the Literary Editor of The Crisis, poet, essayist, and published novelist in the 1920s and 1930s.

In 1926, Fauset's essay "Symphonesque" won first prize in a contest run by Opportunity: A Journal of Negro Life. In 1926, it won an O. Henry Memorial Award.

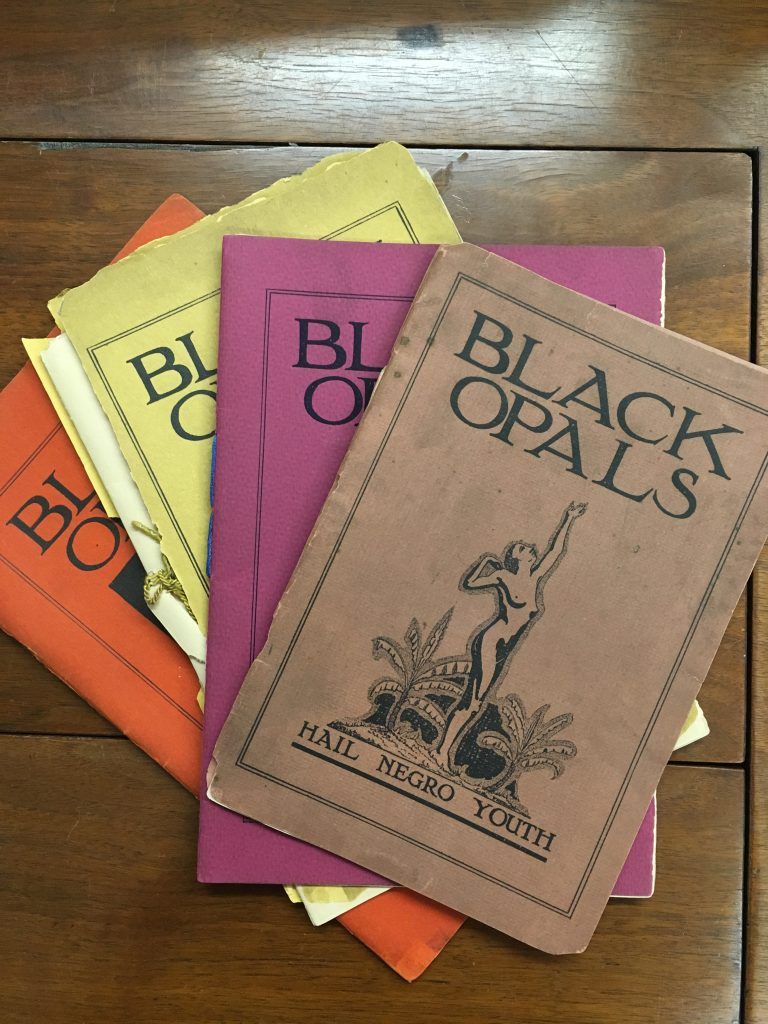
Black Opals literary journal, co-founded by Fauset and Nellie Rathbone Bright

In the 1920s, Fauset was part of a Philadelphia literary group called the Black Opals, typical of African-American groups springing up in several major East Coast cities, and inspired by activities in Harlem. In 1927, they founded a literary magazine called Black Opals, which he co-edited with Nellie Rathbone Bright. She also published poetry in the magazine, as did Mae V. Cowdery; both their pieces were praised by Countee Cullen, the new literary editor of Opportunity. Bright was a teacher in the Philadelphia schools. Another member of the intellectual group and artistic director of the magazine was Allan Randall Freelon, a painter. They published the magazine for one year.

Fauset became acquainted with Frank G. Speck, who introduced him to the newly developing academic field of anthropology. Fauset went to Nova Scotia in the summer of 1923 to collect folklore. He continued to study and work in the field. In 1925, he interviewed Cudjo Lewis in Mobile, Alabama, the last survivor of more than 100 African slaves brought illegally in 1860 to the US by the American slave ship Clotilde. They were trafficked 52 years after the US banned the Atlantic trade. Fauset published two of Lewis' traditional stories, as well as his account of hunting in Africa in a 1927 issue of the Journal of American Folklore.

Fauset concentrated on his work in anthropology, participating in the Philadelphia Anthropology Society, the American Anthropological Association, and the American Folklore Society. The latter published his Nova Scotian findings in their Memoirs in 1931. Elsie Clews Parsons, a wealthy white woman, supported Fauset as a patron throughout his career in anthropology. With her support, he published his Ph.D. dissertation on Negro cults of Philadelphia, New York City and Chicago, as Black Gods of the Metropolis (1944).

In 1932–33, Fauset served as vice-president of the Philadelphia teachers' union and participated in its reorganization. He also joined the National Negro Congress.

== Published works ==
- For Freedom; A Biographical Study of the American Negro. Franklin Pub. and Supply Co., 1927.
- Folklore from Nova Scotia, Memoirs of the American Folklore Society, Vol. 24, 1931. Reprint: Corinthian Press, 1988.
- Black Gods of the Metropolis; Negro Religious Cults of the Urban North. University of Pennsylvania Press, 1944. Reprint 1971. Reprinted 2001 (with an introduction by John Szwed and a foreword by Barbara Dianne Savage).
- Sojourner Truth; God's Faithful Pilgrim. Russell & Russell, 1971.
- with Nellie Rathbone Bright: America: Red, White, Black, Yellow. Franklin Pub. and supply Co., 1969.
