= Saturday Evening Quill =

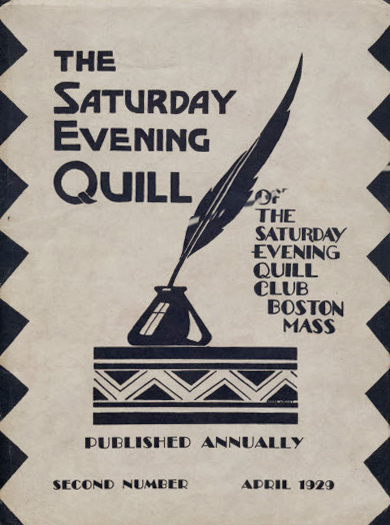

The Saturday Evening Quill was a short-lived African-American literary magazine of the Harlem Renaissance. Located in Boston, it was founded by the journalist Eugene Gordon. Only three issues were published: June 1928, April 1929, and June 1930. It was intended mainly for the club members and their family and friends, only 250 copies of the first two annuals were created. The third and final issue published in 1930 was the only one to be mass produced and made available for sale to the public.

== History ==
In July 1925, Boston-based journalist Eugene Gordon organized an African-American literary group, the Saturday Evening Quill Club (also known as the Boston Quill Club). Every aspect behind the Saturday Evening Quill's startup was thanks to Eugene Gordon. Out of this club grew an annual literary magazine, Saturday Evening Quill, which Gordon edited. With Gordon's prior experiences writing for the Boston Post, it supported that he was very qualified to edit the magazine and lead literary workshops. Gordon made the connections and communicated with multiple aspiring African American artists around the Boston area. He then asked each of them if they would be interested in joining his literary workshop. With this he created a learning space for artists to help each other improve their writings. The first ever meeting of the club was at the Women's Service Club in Boston. After that, Eugene and his wife, Edythe, offered their home as a place for the literary club's weekly meet ups. The club had at least twenty three members, the treasurer was Alice Chapman Furlong, the secretary was Grace Vera Postles, and the creator of the monogram was Roscoe Wright.

== Notable contributors ==
A majority of authors of the Saturday Evening Quill were African American Women. In fact two of the founding members were women. The two were Dorothy West and Helene Johnson, not only were these two founders, but they were also the youngest people to contribute to the newspaper's annual. The secretary, Grace Vera Postles, and the treasurer, Florence Harmon were also women. Other female writers like Florida Ruffin Ridley, Gertrude Schalk, Alvira Hazzard, Edythe Mae Gordon, Gertrude Parthenia McBrown, Lois Mailou Jones, and Alice Chapman Furlong also contributed to the newspaper. Florida Ridley, born and raised in Boston, posted only very few items within the Saturday Evening Quill's annual. Her works included an essay named Other Bostonians and a biographical sketch. Additionally, Gertrude McBrown, who graduated from Boston University, wrote poems for the newspaper. In the 1929 Annual she posted her poem Fire-Flies, it was paired with a drawing of angels with lanterns under the night sky made by Lois Jones. Alice Furlong shared her poem Awaiting with the 1929 Annual. There were also male members of the club: Lewis Grandison Alexander, Ralf Meshack Coleman, Waring Cuney, Eugene Gordon. Ralf Meshack Coleman curated two plays and published a poem, Song of the Youth. Waring Cuney, another prominent writer for Saturday Evening Quill, published a total of nine poems. Lastly, the founder Eugene Gordon who created a club from the ground up, found and made connections with all the authors, mentored many of the members, and edited and published all of the annuals.

== Purpose ==
The Saturday Evening Quill published stories, poems, essays, illustrations, and plays. It provided young African American authors living in Boston a safe and supportive space to reveal their experiences and opinions of the hardships that come with being African American in America. It had a huge influence on bringing attention to African American features, especially those outside of Harlem. The newspaper's first annual, posted in 1928, was monumental for African Americans living in Boston. The paper was the only African American newspaper within Boston to publish annuals since its preceptor, New Era Magazine, stopped publishing in 1916. This made it the only way African Americans in Boston could share their words with the public. The newspaper's influence was at its highest point when it overlapped with other African American literary works in Boston. For example, the combination of the newspaper and Boston's little theatre movement. Like stated earlier, many of the authors posts expressed their different experiences living in America and being African American during the Harlem Renaissance. For example, Ridley's essay focused on her African American families's proud feelings of identifying themselves as Bostonians given they have lived freely in Boston for over three generations. Additionally, McBrowns poem seems to be written to show how African Americans still shine (like fireflies), even when they face hard times throughout the Harlem Renaissance time period.

== Effects ==
Within the Saturday Evening Quill club, authors helped each other become better writers. Many of the member's works received high recognition and praise. For example, both Eugene and Edythe Gordon, Dorothy West, Helene Johnson, and Gertrude Schalk were mentioned in Best Short Stories of 1928 and Memorial Prize Stories of 1928. Gordon influenced Johnson and West's literary careers greatly. Not only did the contributors of the Club receive praise, but the club itself did as well. According to Gwendolyn Bennett, the Saturday Evening Quill brought attention to African American literary works in parts of America that were overshadowed by those in Harlem.
