= Max Bedacht =

German-born American revolutionary socialist

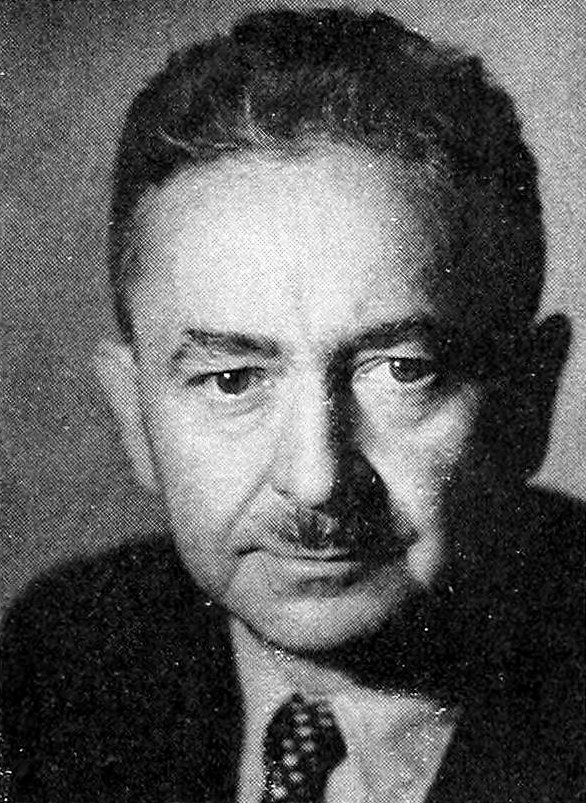
- Bedacht c. 1938

General Secretary of the International Workers Order
- In office May 11, 1935 – 1954
- Preceded by: Rubin Saltzman
- Succeeded by: Position abolished

Personal details
- Born: October 13, 1883 Munich, Kingdom of Bavaria, German Empire
- Died: July 4, 1972 (aged 88) New York City, U.S.
- Party: Communist Party USA
- Spouse: Elizabeth Bedacht
- Children: Elsie, Edith, Ethel, and Max
- Known for: Co-founder of CPUSA and general secretary of IWO

Max Bedacht Sr. (October 13, 1883 – July 4, 1972) was a German-born American revolutionary socialist political activist, journalist, and functionary who helped establish the Communist Party of America. Bedacht is best remembered as the long-time head of the International Workers Order, a Communist Party-sponsored fraternal benefit organization.

== Biography ==
=== Early years ===
Max Bedacht Sr. was born in Munich, Germany to an ethnically German mother on October 13, 1883. He was the son of a single mother who worked as a domestic servant and was raised Catholic by a maternal aunt and uncle.

=== Early labor activities ===
Bedacht apprenticed and worked as a barber in Germany and Switzerland, working in the towns of Gossau and Herisau. He organized fellow journeymen barbers into a union during his European years. In 1905 he joined the Social Democratic Party of Switzerland. In 1907, Bedacht was elected president of the Swiss National Barbers' Union and edited the organization's newspaper. That same year he took part in his first labor action, a sympathy strike held for the striking chocolate workers on the banks of Lake Geneva.

During a barbers' strike the following year, Bedacht rented a building for a cooperative barber shop in his name. In the settlement of the strike, the plan for the cooperative facility was abandoned, however, and Bedacht was sued for breach of contract by the building's landlord. While the union's members offered to pay the money for him, Bedacht decided to emigrate to the United States rather than allow this to take place.

=== Activities: New York City ===
Bedacht immigrated to the United States in 1908 and joined the Socialist Party of America (SPA) during that same year. He lived and worked in Manhattan from 1910 to 1912, cutting hair by day while spending his evenings as a German-language socialist agitator. After this he spent a brief period in Detroit as editor of both German-language and English-language Socialist newspapers.

=== Activities: San Francisco ===
In June 1913 he moved to San Francisco to become the editor of the German-language labor newspaper Vorwärts der Pacific Küste (Forward of the Pacific Coast), a job which he retained until the paper's termination in 1917 due to draconian postal regulations being placed on the foreign language press during World War I. He briefly moved to South Dakota to edit a paper called The New Era following the demise of the Vorwärts, but soon returned to San Francisco when he found that publication unviable, taking up the barbers' shears again.

Bedacht was long an adherent of the so-called impossibilist wing of the Socialist Party, placing his faith in socialist revolution rather than the ameliorative reform of elected officials. As was the case with many radicals in America, Bedacht was inspired by the Bolshevik Revolution of 1917 and was an early adherent of the 1919 Left Wing Manifesto written by Louis C. Fraina and the Left Wing Section of the Socialist Party, which emerged in conjunction with that document. Bedacht was a Left Wing candidate for the SPA's governing National Executive Committee in 1919 and a delegate to the SPA's pivotal 1919 Emergency National Convention.

=== Chicago convention of 1919 ===
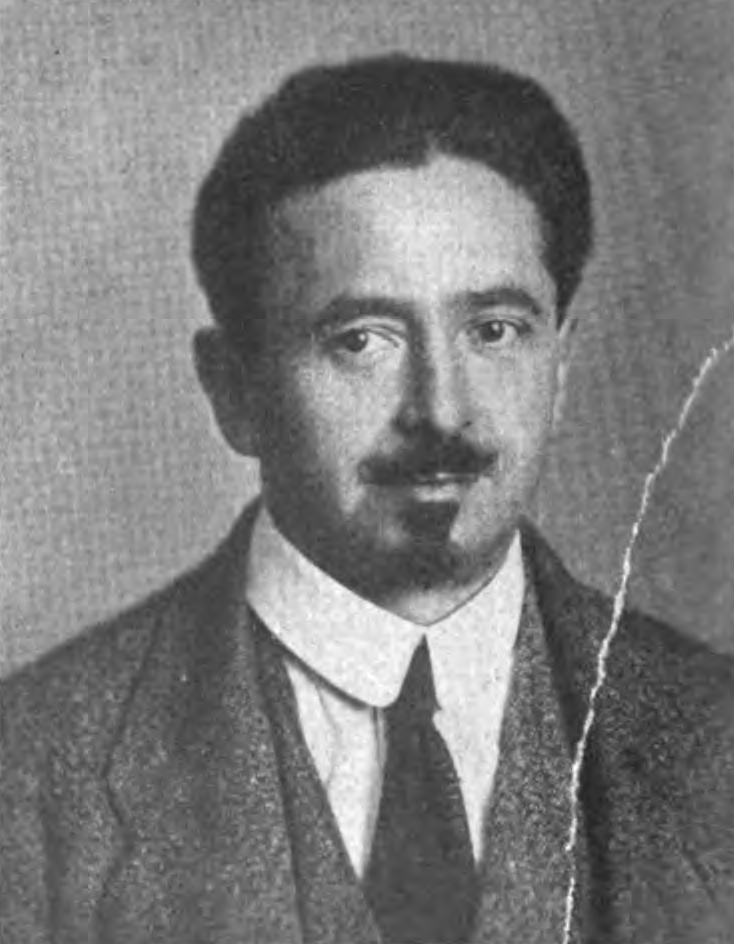
Bedacht c. 1923

At the Chicago convention in August 1919, the Left Wing California delegation was challenged at the time the gathering was convened, placing the delegates in limbo, their fate held in the mercy of a committee firmly controlled by the "Regular" faction of National Executive Secretary Adolph Germer and James Oneal. The Credentials Committee, headed by Judge Jacob Panken of New York City, stalled the hearings on the California delegation until after the convention was underway and until it was clear that a safe majority of delegates were in the Regulars' camp.

As a result, although they were ultimately approved by the committee, the California delegation refused to take their seats in protest and went downstairs to attend the parallel convention of the Communist Labor Party (CLP) convened by NEC members Alfred Wagenknecht and L.E. Katterfeld. Bedacht was elected at the founding convention to the 5 member National Executive Committee which governed the CLP.

During the Palmer Raids in California and Chicago, Bedacht was arrested and tried for conspiracy. However, despite conviction, he avoided prison. Soon afterwards, he traveled to Europe and Russia as an international delegate for the Communist Party.

Bedacht was a delegate of the Workers Party of America to the 4th and 5th World Congresses of the Communist International.

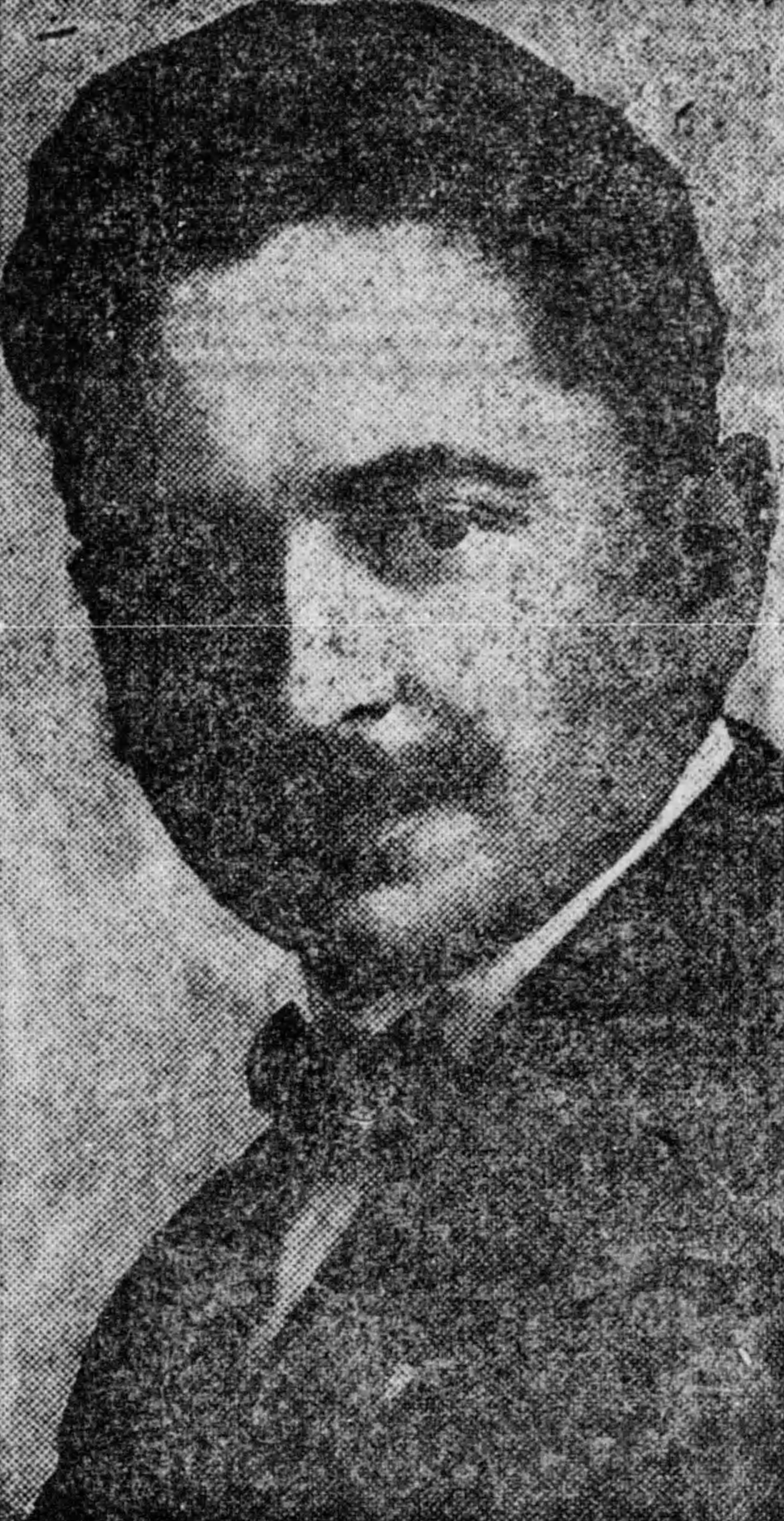
Bedacht as Chicago district organizer, 1928

Bedacht lived in Chicago at 3101 North Nordica Avenue, from 1923 to 1928, according to his testimony before HUAC in 1949.

=== Activities: New York City ===
In 1929, Bedacht took over as liaison with the Soviet underground after the expulsion of Jay Lovestone from the Party in 1929.

In the summer of 1932, Bedacht invited Whittaker Chambers to join the Soviet underground. Chambers described Bedacht's approach as follows:

"What are you doing now, Comrade Chambers?" Bedacht asked me. I said that I was editing the New Masses. "You were out of the party for a while, weren't you?" he asked . I said that I had been out of the party. "For some reason," he said, as if he strongly disapproved of the whole business, "they want you to go into one of the party's 'special institutions'." Bedacht always used that expression in referring to any of the Communist underground apparatuses. But it was a term new to me.

I asked what he meant.

"It is a 'special institution'," he repeated. As I still looked blank, he added: "They want you to do underground work." ...

Then I said: "I am sorry, but I have decided not to do it."

"You have no choice," said the little man. He meant, of course, that I was under the discipline of the party and that, if I did not go into the underground, I would go out of the party. "In fact," he added, "in a few minutes I am going to take you to someone from the 'special institution'.

In 1934, he ran on the Communist ticket for U.S. Senator from New York and received 45,396 votes (1.23%).

In 1937, he said under oath in 1948, "I went to Spain with a committee of eight to the International Brigade in Spain. I think it was 1937."

In 1939, Time Magazine cited Bedacht in connection with the arrest of Party leader Earl Browder on charges of indicted a Federal Grand Jury in New York City on two counts connected to passport: "Possible was the bagging by Frank Murphy of such Reds as Executive Committeeman Max Bedacht, Publisher Alexander Trachtenberg."

=== International Workers Order ===
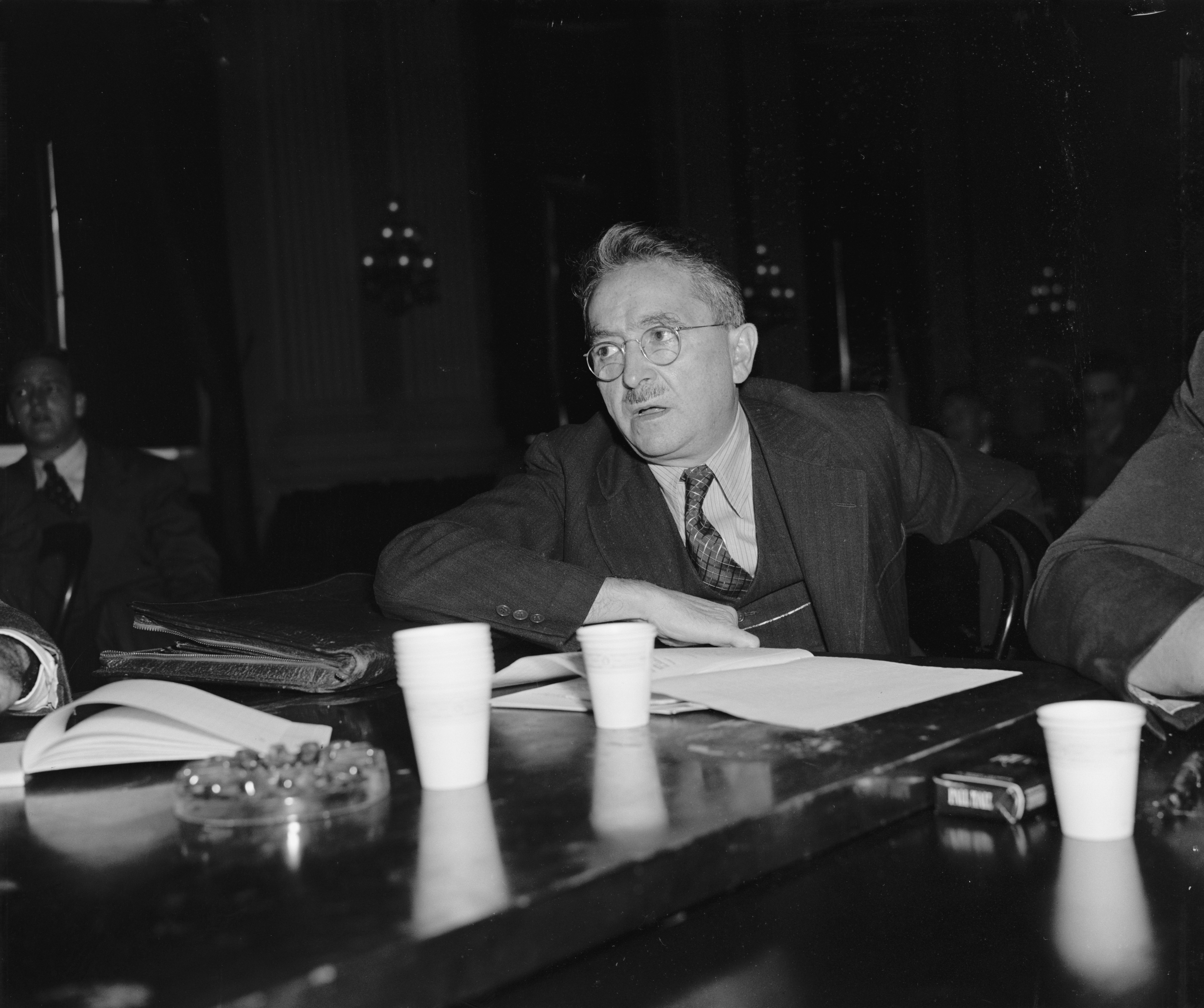
Bedacht testifies before the Dies Committee, October 16, 1939

In the 1930s, Bedacht became general secretary of the International Workers Order (IWO), a Communist Party-affiliated insurance, mutual benefit, and fraternal organization (1930–1954), whose membership peaked in the late 1940s at 200,000 members. In the mid-1940s, Bedacht appeared under subpoena before the Special Committee on Un-American Activities of the US House of Representatives (or "Dies Committee").

=== Expulsion ===
In November 1948, Bedacht was expelled from the national CPUSA.

In November 1949, Bedacht appeared before the House Un-American Activities Committee (HUAC). Regarding his activities, he answered when asked:

Mr. Tavenner: Will you please state for the committee the official positions which you have held in the past in the Communist Party of the United States?
Mr. Bedacht: Almost everything up to secretary. I was never the editor of the Daily Worker.

Regarding his expulsion from the CPUSA, he held this exchange:

Mr. Tavenner: I believe you have recently been expelled from Communist Party, have you not?
Mr. Bedacht. Yes, sir.
Mr. Tavenner. On what grounds did this expulsion take place?
Mr. Bedacht: I don't know that I know myself, but, anyway, this committee is surely not a court of appeals against my expulsion, and my explanation for it would take quite a while, and you would have to listen to the other side, too.
Mr. Tavenner: I will not go into that. It was the result of a factional dispute within the party; is that substantially right?
Mr. Bedacht: You may say so.

== Personal life and death ==
Bedacht was married and had four children, three daughters and a son: Elsie, Edith, Ethel, and Max. His eldest daughter worked for a time in the National Office of the American Communist Party in the early 1930s.

Max Bedacht died in Jamaica, Queens on July 4, 1972. His Communist Party membership had been reinstated a few years prior.

== Works ==
=== Books and pamphlets ===
- In Memoriam: To our comrades Karl Liebknecht, 1871–1919, Rosa Luxemburg, 1871–1919, Martyrs to the German Revolution. San Francisco : Socialist Party of San Francisco, 1919
- Principles of Communism: Engel's Original Draft of the Communist Manifesto. (Editor.) Chicago: Daily Worker Publishing Co., 1925
- The Menace of Opportunism: A Contribution to the Bolshevization of the Workers (Communist) Party. Chicago: Daily Worker Publishing Co., 1926
- Anti-Soviet Lies and the Five-Year Plan: The "Holy" Capitalist War Against the Soviet Union. New York: Workers Library Publishers, 1931
- Karl Marx, 1883-1933 With Earl Browder and Sam Don. New York: Workers Library Publishers, 1933
- Unity of the Workers' Fraternal Movement: A Speech. New York: Cultural Committee of the International Workers Order, 1936
- Labor Fraternalism: The Fraternal Principles and Program of the IWO. New York: National Education Dept., International Workers Order, 1941
- An Appeal of the German Communists: Destroy Hitler! Free Germany! With Alfred Wagenknecht. New York: Workers Library Publishers, 1942
- The International Workers Order from the Fifth to the Sixth Convention: Report of the General Secretary Max Bedacht to the IWO Sixth National Convention, July 2–7, 1944, New York City. New York: International Workers Order, 1944
- The Task Before Us: Address. New York: International Workers Order, 1944
- Complete Equality: Democracy and the Negroes. New York: International Workers Order, 1945
- Your Health — America's Wealth. New York: International Workers Order, 1945
- On the Path of Life (memoirs), 1967

=== Articles ===
All articles listed here come from the Marxists Internet Archive except the 1926 Daily Worker article entitled "Eastman Drops His Mask."

- Communist Labor Party Mail Referendum for NEC Motions 3 and 4 (1919)
- Letter to the Central Executive Committee of the United Communist Party (1921)
- To the CEC of the CPA (PDF) (1926)
- Report on the 4th Comintern Congress to the CEC of the Workers Party of America (1921)
- Circular Letter to All District Organizers of the Unified CPA (1922)
- Letter to the Executive Committee of the Communist International in Moscow (1924)
- "Eastman Drops His Mask," The Daily Worker, vol. 3, no. 237 (October 20, 1926), pp. 1, 6
- Editorial (1927)

=== Miscellaneous ===
- Letter to Theodore Draper (1954)
