= Jewish People's Fraternal Order =

Division of the International Workers Order

- Successor: Jewish Cultural Clubs and Societies (1955)
- Formation: 1930
- Dissolved: 1955
- Type: mutual aid, fraternal organization, political advocacy, cultural
- Affiliations: International Workers Order

The Jewish People's Fraternal Order (JPFO) was the Jewish division of the International Workers Order. At its peak following World War II, the JPFO had around 50,000 members.

== History ==
The International Workers Order (IWO) originated as a split within The Workmen's Circle (Der Arbeter Ring, now called The Workers Circle) in 1922. In 1930, the IWO officially branched off as a separate organization. The IWO had 14 sections divided according to language, including Yiddish, Italian, Greek, Ukrainian, Spanish, Portuguese, English, and other language branches. The JPFO was the Jewish section of the IWO. Among people familiar with the JPFO, mostly Yiddish-speaking immigrant leftists, the organization was often referred to as Di Linke ("The Left" in Yiddish).

In the 1940s and 1950s, the Los Angeles chapter of the JPFO was one of the most popular organizations in the Jewish community of Los Angeles. The LA chapter had more Jewish students enrolled in its educational network than any other Jewish organization in the city. In 1949, a campaign began within the Jewish community to have the JPFO expelled from the mainstream Jewish community. The Los Angeles Jewish Community Council (now the Jewish Federation Los Angeles), with the backing of the Workmen’s Circle and the American Jewish Congress, sought to expel the JPFO for allegedly violating their policy against "political" organizations, despite allowing for multiple Zionist organizations. The Jewish Community Council insisted that Zionism was not a political ideology. In 1947, during McCarthyism, and the IWO and all of "its subdivisions, subsidiaries and affiliates", including the JPFO, was placed on US Attorney General Tom C. Clark's list of "subversive" organizations. In 1959, the Jewish Federation of Los Angeles expelled the LA JPFO, froze the organization's assets, and advocated for the dissolution of the organization.

The Emma Lazarus Federation of Jewish Women's Clubs (ELF) originated as the Emma Lazarus Division of the JPFO's Women's Division. ELF later became a separate organization in 1951, due to legal action by New York Attorney General Nathaniel L. Goldstein that accused the JPFO of being a "subversive" organization.

The IWO was disbanded in 1954 and the JFPO reconstituted as the Jewish Cultural Clubs and Societies, but without the mutual benefit component of JPFO. A Canadian equivalent, the United Jewish People's Order, still exists as of 2025.

== See also ==
- International Workers Order
- Jewish left
- McCarthyism and antisemitism
- United Jewish People's Order (Canadian equivalent of the JPFO)
