= Gertrude P. McBrown =

American poet

Gertrude Parthenia McBrown
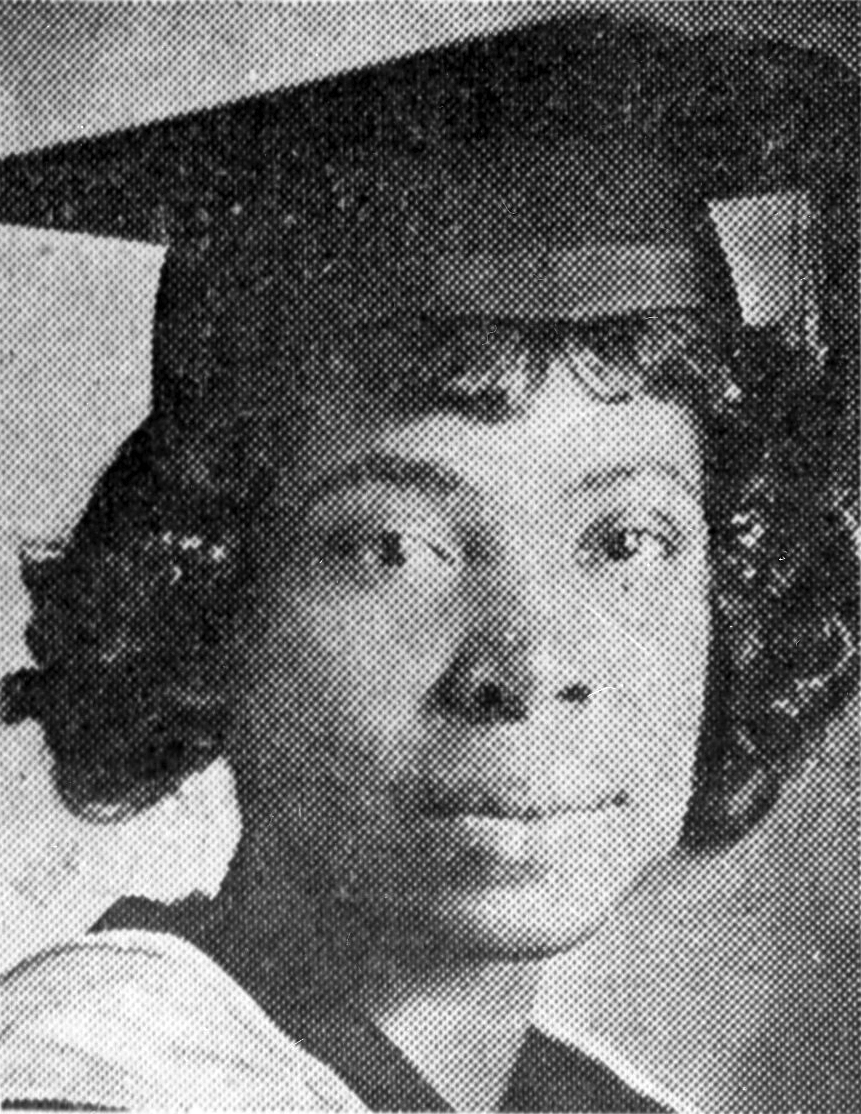
- McBrown in 1922
- Born: 1898; Charleston, South Carolina
- Died: 1989 (aged 90–91)
- Education: Curry School of Expression; Emerson College; Boston University
- Occupations: Poet; Playwright; Educator; Actress; Stage director

Gertrude P. McBrown (1898-1989) was an American poet, playwright, educator, actress, and stage director. Although her career lasted well beyond the 1930s, she is sometimes grouped with writers of the Harlem Renaissance.

== Early life and education ==
McBrown was born in 1898 in Charleston, South Carolina. Her father was a Methodist minister. As a child she heard a dramatic reading by actor Richard Berry Harrison, which sparked her interest in acting and public speaking. She studied under Florence H. Slack at the Curry School of Expression in Boston before enrolling in the Emerson College of Oratory in 1918. She was a member of the debating team and the Children's Theatre at Emerson, where she gained experience performing in and directing plays. She graduated in 1922 with a B.L.I. degree (Bachelor of Literary Interpretation).

After graduation she taught English and dramatic arts for a year at Virginia State College. She then returned to Boston and pursued graduate studies at Boston University, receiving a Master of Education degree in 1926. While a student at Boston University, she was assistant coach of the dramatic club and taught in the Boston public schools. At this time she began writing children's poetry, which was published in the Saturday Evening Quill and Crisis magazine. She also headed the choral group and directed productions for the Ebenezer Baptist Church in Boston's South End.

== Career ==
After receiving her M.Ed., McBrown moved to North Carolina, where she headed the drama department at Palmer Memorial Institute under the leadership of Charlotte Hawkins Brown. While at Palmer, McBrown's production of George V. Hobart's Experience earned a glowing review in Crisis magazine (August 1929). She then taught dramatic arts at North Carolina Agricultural and Technical College, taking the place of Richard B. Harrison, who had left to take a lead role in a Broadway production.

In the 1930s she moved to Washington, D.C., where she became prominent in literary and dramatic circles. She directed the Southeast Children's Theatre, the Bronze Masque of Freedmen's Training School, and the dramatic club of the Lambda Rho Society of the Asbury Methodist Episcopal Church. She worked as a speech teacher at the Washington Conservatory of Music, and as an English teacher at Frelinghuysen University, where university founder Anna Julia Cooper was serving as president. McBrown also opened her own studio.

While in Washington she became increasingly interested in children's poetry and theater. In 1935 she published her first book of poetry, The Picture-Poetry Book, illustrated by Lois Mailou Jones. (McBrown and Jones collaborated on other occasions; for example, McBrown's poem, "Fire-Flies," appears with an illustration by Jones in the Saturday Evening Quill.) McBrown's poetry (both children's poetry and poetry for adults) was published in various magazines and literary journals, including Opportunity, Popular Educator, International Poetry Magazine, Black Opals, Negro Women's World, and Phylon. She became managing editor of Parent-Teacher Magazine, and wrote feature stories for the Associated Negro Press.

McBrown served for many years on the board of the Negro History Bulletin, edited by Carter G. Woodson. The Bulletin published her first two plays, both with historical themes. Bought With Cookies (1949) tells the story of a young Frederick Douglass; The Birthday Surprise (1953) is about Paul Laurence Dunbar.

She earned national recognition for her one-woman shows, in which she often impersonated African-American heroines. She was also a noted storyteller, often donning resplendent African costumes to entertain children with tales from Africa. In the 1950s, McBrown moved to New York City to direct drama groups and teach speech at the Carnegie Hall Studio. She was a co-founder of the Carter G. Woodson Memorial Research Collection in the Jamaica branch of the Queens Library. She also wrote a column, "Proud Heritage," for her neighborhood newspaper, Community Chatter.

She traveled the world, continuing her education and sharing her knowledge with others. She studied at the Conservatoire Nationale de Musique et d'Art and took courses in drama and literature at the Institut Britannique in Paris. At the Royal Empire Society and the Royal Academy of Dramatic Art in London, she researched African folklore and culture. While traveling in Africa, she delighted audiences with performances of her stories. During the final years of her life, severe arthritis forced her to slow down.

In 1970 she received Carter G. Woodson award from the Association for the Study of Negro Life and History. She died in 1989.

== Selected works ==
- The Picture-Poetry Book. Illustrated by Lois Mailou Jones. New York: Associated Publishers. 1935.
- Bought With Cookies, 1949
- The Birthday Surprise, 1953
