= Eugene Gordon (writer) =

American writer (1891–1974)

Eugene Gordon (November 23, 1891 – March 18, 1974) was a journalist, editor, fiction writer, World War I officer, and social activist. He cofounded and edited the Harlem Renaissance literary magazine Saturday Evening Quill and edited a magazine put out by the Boston John Reed Club. He wrote primarily on subjects related to racial discrimination and social justice. He published some fiction under pseudonyms, using Egor Don (which combines his first initial and last name) and (more rarely) Clark Hall and Frank Lynn.

He was married to prominent Harlem Renaissance writer Edythe Mae Gordon and mentored writers Dorothy West and Helene Johnson.

== Education and personal life ==
Eugene Gordon was born on November 23, 1891 in Oviedo, Florida. He grew up in Hawkinsville, Georgia and was raised in New Orleans, where he later recalled living through the Robert Charles riots. Gordon writes about the challenges of growing up in the South in the short story "Southern Boyhood Nightmares".

He attended Howard University and Boston University where he studied English and journalism. At Howard, he met his first wife Edythe Mae Chapman, a prominent writer and poet during the Harlem Renaissance. The two married on January 10, 1916.

They separated in 1932 and divorced in 1942. His second wife, June Croll, was a noted labor organizer; they had a son together.

After graduating Howard in 1917, Gordon served as a U.S. Army second lieutenant in France during World War I. He was awarded a World War I Victory Medal and returned to the U.S. in 1919. He moved to Cambridge, Massachusetts.

When he returned to the U.S., Gordon was frustrated by the poor treatment of Black veterans. A few years later, he moved to New York and joined the Communist Party.

== Writing career ==
Gordon became a staff writer for the Boston Daily Post, rising to assistant feature writer in 1919. During the 1920s, he began publishing both fiction and nonfiction in periodicals like American Mercury, Scribner's Magazine, The Nation, and Plain Talk, as well as in the Annals of the American Academy of Political and Social Science. His fiction ranged from stories about African-American life to a war story set in France. His short story “Game” won first prize in Opportunity magazine's 1927 literary contest.

Gordon was passionate about raising journalistic standards for the Black press. In 1924, he published a series of articles in Opportunity, about the mediocrity of many Black publications. And during the mid-1920s, he began publishing an annual series, "Survey of the Negro Press," in which he offered his selection for the best newspaper of the year, and also listed his choices for such categories as excellence in reporting, and best feature writing.

In 1925, Gordon organized an African-American literary group, the Saturday Evening Quill Club. Its founding members included fellow writers Helene Johnson and Dorothy West, and Gordon served as its president. Out of this grew an annual literary magazine, Saturday Evening Quill, which Gordon edited during its brief existence from 1928 to 1930. It published two issues. In the second issue, Gordon published "Negro Fictionists in America" about the differences between the white and Black portrayal of Black characters in media.

Gordon joined the American Communist Party in 1931 and co-founded the Boston John Reed Club, becoming the first editor of the club magazine, Leftward. He moved to the Soviet Union for a year (1937–38) and became a reporter for the Moscow Daily News. On his return to the United States, he became a contributing editor, writer, and reporter for the leftist Daily Worker (1938–1946).

Gordon's nonfiction writing about social issues increased after he became a communist. Throughout the 1930s and 1940s, he wrote about such topics as black labor, the rape of black women, the limits faced by black writers in an oppressive culture, and African Americans' relationship to political radicalism; this last essay appeared in Nancy Cunard's 1933 book Negro: An Anthology.

By the 1950s, Gordon had joined the staff of the radical leftist weekly National Guardian, for which he reported on the 1955 Bandung Conference in Indonesia, which was an important step in the development of the Non-Aligned Movement. In the late 1950s, he wrote a column for the black press that lasted for about two years, "Another Side of the Story."

Gordon effectively retired from public life in the 1960s and turned his energies to watercolor painting.

When Gordon died in 1974, Henry Winston—then the chairman of the American Communist Party—praised him as "a dedicated partisan in the fight on many fronts for Democracy and Socialism." A more recent commentator assesses Gordon as a "hard-working, if uninspired" journalist of admirable dedication. His papers, including correspondence and various unpublished writings, are held by the New York Public Library.

== "The Negro Press" ==
"The Negro Press" was first published in the American Mercury in June 1926. Gordon explained Black journalism was divided into three distinct phases: pre-Civil War, post-Civil War, and post-World War. The pre-Civil War era was marked by abolition journals. After the war, writing shifted to focus on gaining citizenship for the formerly enslaved. Finally, after World War I, Black publications wrote about democracy as it pertained to Black citizens.

Freedom's Journal, established in 1827, was the first Black newspaper. It published the writings of formerly enslaved people and supported abolition. Gordon notes that early Black newspapers would not meet the journalistic standards of the 1920s. The content was well-written but opinionated. Publications at the time shared mostly essays, editorials, and biographies. Anti-slavery publications were influential but not profitable.

After the Emancipation Proclamation, abolition was accomplished and Black publications struggled to find new purpose. Pamphlets became a popular way to share information because they were inexpensive and effective. Gordon observes that churches sponsored the Black press at this time. Churches were "the units of Negro life" and used the press to "establish contact with their congregations." Controlling the press allowed churches to disseminate news and opinions and "propagandize" its followers. Some popular publications include The Christian Recorder and Star of Zion.

The arrival of World War I birthed new ideas in Black communities. Some men saw the war as an opportunity to improve race relations by fighting for America, while Black veterans, like Gordon, were not granted the respect they hoped for. The lack of change created a "so-called new Negro", who publicly desired complete equality and supported the Bolshevik Revolution (which abolished monarchy in Russia and created a communist government). The Messenger was a popular Black magazine that openly supported economic and social equality.

Gordon notes that at this time, journalism was beginning to be considered a profession by Black publications. Prior, it was seen as a part-time job at most. With comparisons to metropolitan daily newspapers mounting, Black editors held their publication to higher journalistic standards and began to visually resemble white newspapers. Gordon cites The Chicago Defender as the blueprint for this homogenized style of newspaper and compares its publisher, Robert S. Abbott, to William Randolph Hearst.

He goes on to rank publications such as The Chicago Defender, Philadelphia Tribune, and the Pittsburgh Courier according to news, editorials, features, and appearance.

== Selected publications ==
Fiction;

- "Game" (as Egor Don, in Opportunity, 1927)
- "Sarcophagus" (in The Saturday Evening Quill, 1928)

Nonfiction;

- "The Negro Press" (in American Mercury, v. 8, no. 30 (June 1926) 207–215)
- "Christianity and the Negro" (in The Lantern, 1929)
- "The Negro Grows Up," (in Plain Talk, 1929)
- "Negro Fictionists in America" (in Saturday Evening Quill, 1929)
- “Blacks Turn Red” (in Negro: An Anthology, 1933)
- "Negro Novelists and the Negro Masses" (in New Masses, 1933)
- "Southern Boyhood Nightmares" (in International Literature, 1934)
- The Position of Negro Women (pamphlet, with Cyril Briggs, 1935)
- "How Prostitution Has Been Fought and Almost Completely Eliminated in the USSR" (in Moscow News, 1937)
- "Who Is George S. Schuyler" (in Worker, 1946)
- "Negro Labor Advances" (in Jewish Life, 1953)
- “The Green Hat Comes to Chambers Street” (in Nancy Cunard: Brave Poet, Indomitable Rebel, 1968)
