= Crystal Bird Fauset =

American state legislator

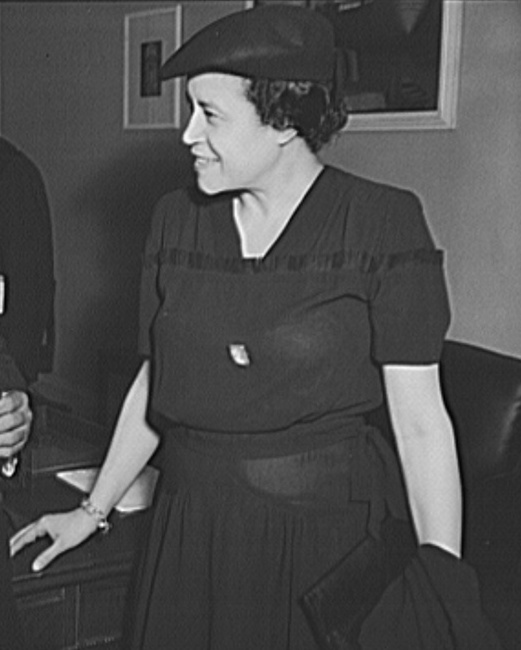

Member of the Pennsylvania House of Representatives from the 18th district
- In office 1939 – January 8, 1940

Personal details
- Born: Crystal Dreda Bird; June 27, 1893 Princess Anne, Maryland, U.S.
- Died: March 27, 1965 (aged 71) Philadelphia, Pennsylvania, U.S.
- Resting place: Mt. Lawn Cemetery, Sharon Hill, Pennsylvania, U.S.
- Party: Democratic
- Spouse: Arthur Fauset (m. 1931; divorced 1944)
- Occupation: Politician

Crystal Dreda Bird Fauset (June 27, 1893 – March 27, 1965) was a civil rights activist, social worker, race relations specialist, and the first African American woman elected to a state legislature in the United States, based in Philadelphia, Pennsylvania.

Born in Maryland and raised in Boston, Fauset started her professional career as a public school teacher in Boston. She would then go onto work for the Young Women's Christian Association, and then with the American Friends Service Committee. In 1935, she became assistant to the director of Philadelphia's Works Progress Administration and also began politically organizing for the Democratic National Committee. In 1938, Fauset was elected to the Pennsylvania state legislature. She served for a year as a state representative in which she introduced nine bills and three amendments on issues ranging from affordable housing projects to fair employment legislation.

During the Roosevelt administration, Fauset was appointed to the Office of Civilian Defense on October 20, 1941, and worked as a race relations advisor. In 1944, she broke away from the Democratic Party and publicly supported the Republican presidential candidate. In her later years, Fauset turned to global issues and helped found the United Nations Council of Philadelphia, later known as the World Affairs Council.

== Personal life ==
Crystal Bird Fauset was born in Princess Anne, Maryland, to parents Benjamin Oliver Bird and Portia E. Bird (née Lovett). She was one of nine children. Her father was the first principal of Princess Anne Academy, a school for black students. The academy was the predecessor to the University of Maryland Eastern Shore. Portia Bird would become the principal after her husband's death in 1897, and would remain in the position till her death in 1900. Crystal Dreda Bird was then raised by her maternal aunt, Lucy Groves in Boston, who encouraged her to become an educator. Bird attended integrated public schools and, in 1914, graduated from Boston Normal School. She received a B.S. degree in education from Teachers College, Columbia University, in 1931, the same year she married educator, civil rights activist, and anthropologist Arthur Fauset who was the half-brother of Jessie Redmon Fauset, a Harlem Renaissance writer. They would eventually separate and finalize divorce in 1944.

== Professional life ==
After graduating from Boston Normal School, Fauset was a public school teacher from 1914 to 1918 before taking a position as a field secretary for the Young Women's Christian Association (YWCA) where she worked on programs aimed at black youth and working girls throughout the United States. In this position, she also began to speak out about the concerns of black community and race relations in general. She later became actively involved in several different organizations geared towards the advancement for African Americans rights.

=== American Friends Service Committee ===
While attending Columbia University, Bird joined the American Friends Service Committee (AFSC), a Quaker organization, in September 1927. The AFSC had become interested in improving race relations in the United States and had formed their Interracial Section in 1925, two years before offering Bird a staffing position. One of the missions of the organization was to foster intercultural exchange as a way to better racial understanding, and the AFSC sponsored Bird as a touring speaker to promote this message. As an active member of the AFSC, she made about 200 public appearances between 1927 and 1928, addressing between 25,000 and 50,000 people at schools, churches, and civic groups. With her speeches, she aimed to have "people of other racial groups understand the humanness of the Negro wherever he is found" and to "lift the curtain that separates the white people and the colored people, to lift the curtain of misunderstanding that is so dividing us." She analyzed racial prejudice and emphasized the contributions of black communities throughout history. The majority of Bird's appearances occurred with white audiences in places such as Philadelphia, New York City, Boston, Baltimore, Washington, and Indiana. Her appearances in Philadelphia introduced her to the public and left them with a high level of impact.

=== 1928–1937 ===
After finishing her service with the AFSC, Bird continued her education and received a degree from Teachers College, Columbia University, in 1931. She then helped establish the Institute of Race Relations at Swarthmore College in 1933, for which she was the joint executive secretary of the summer seminars for two years. The institute documented employment and housing inequalities against African Americans. Fauset was especially interested in slum clearance and affordable housing projects for the black communities of Philadelphia. She cited the poor infrastructure and a need for urban reform. She and other black clubwomen also pushed for more racial integration within the activities of the Philadelphia branch of the Women's International League for Peace and Freedom. Fauset spoke on her belief that disarmament and peace would be economically beneficial to African Americans and the nation, especially during that time of the Great Depression.

In 1935, Fauset became assistant to the director of Philadelphia's Works Progress Administration (WPA), a New Deal agency centered on public works projects such as constructing roads and financing artistic and literary endeavors. During her time with Philadelphia's WPA, Fauset ended a racial quota system for sewing jobs which helped increase African American women's access to employment. She also began politically organizing for the Philadelphia Democratic Women's League and the Democratic National Committee (DNC), becoming the director of colored women's activities of the DNC in 1936.

At the 1936 Democratic National Convention in Philadelphia, Fauset organized black female WPA workers to form the Willing Works Democratic Organization (WWDO). With a thousand members, the WWDO helped increase voter participation and registration under the Democratic Party in Philadelphia, especially among black communities. Through her time at the Institute of Race Relations and then with the Democratic Party, Fauset became acquainted with First Lady Eleanor Roosevelt. They developed a friendship and collaborated politically. Eleanor Roosevelt's willingness to meet with African American leaders, the New Deal programs under the Roosevelt administration (1933–1945), and increased governmental aid to black communities had led to a realignment of many black voters from the Republican Party to the Democratic Party by the time of President Franklin D. Roosevelt's reelection in 1936.

=== State legislature ===
Supported by the Democrats, Fauset ran for state legislature in 1938. She became the first female African American state legislator in the United States after being elected to the Pennsylvania House of Representatives to represent the 18th District of Philadelphia, which was a primarily white neighborhood at the time. She had won by 7,000 votes and had gained strong support from women through her telephone campaign. She was one of the first American politicians to utilize telephoning in her campaign. Fauset promised her constituents: "I shall work for legislation that affects the general welfare of the people regardless of color. Of her victory, she commented: "My interest is in no way limited to my race, but is universal."

During her time as a state legislator, she represented an area that was 66% White. Fauset introduced nine bills and three amendments in which she advocated for affordable housing, public health efforts, public relief, and fair employment legislation to ban racial discrimination. Additionally, she sponsored an amendment to the Pennsylvania Female Labor Law of 1913 to improve women's workplace rights.

In 1939, Fauset was awarded her first Meritorious Service Medal from the Commonwealth of Pennsylvania for her civic work. Additionally, she was invited to be the central speaker at the annual meeting of the National Council of Negro Women, a non-profit organization founded by civil rights activist Mary McLeod Bethune to encourage and coordinate black women's political participation.

In January 1940, she resigned from the state legislature in order to begin a new position as assistant director of the education and recreation program of the WPA, as well as the organization's race relations advisor in Pennsylvania.

=== Office of Civilian Defense ===
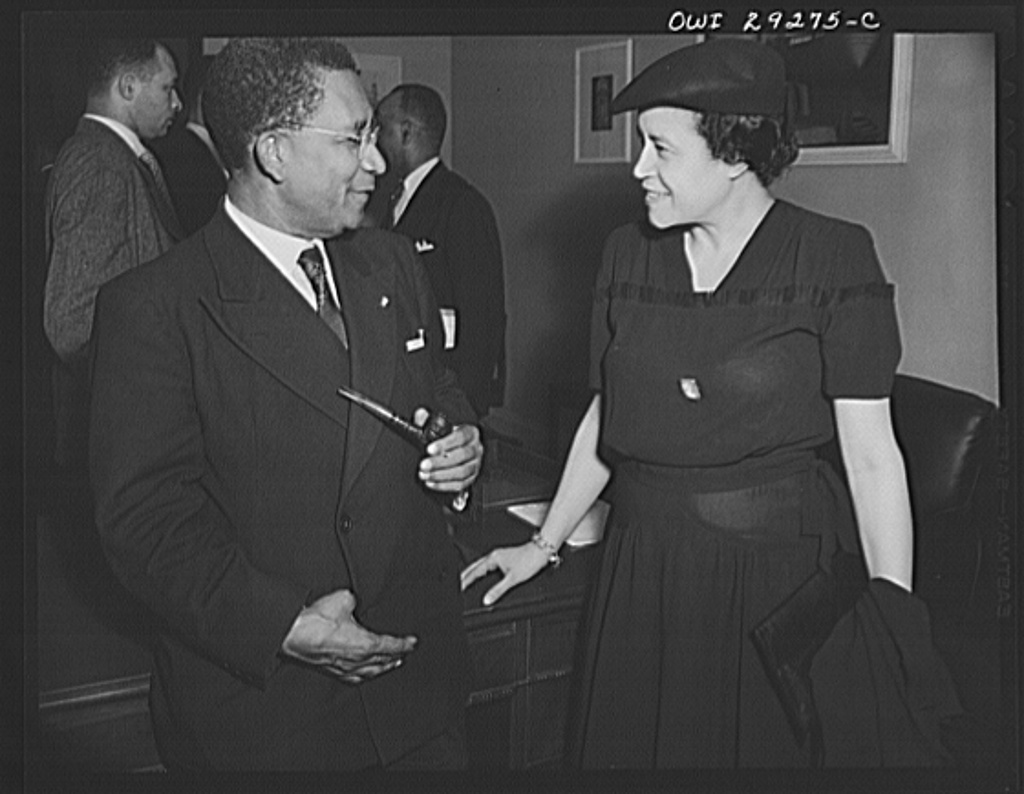
May 1943: President of Liberia, Edwin Barclay, meets Office of Civilian Defense special consultant, Mrs. Crystal Bird Fauset, after a press conference in Washington, D.C.

In October 1941, Fauset was appointed to the newly formed Race Relations Division of the Office of Civilian Defense (OCD), one of the World War II agencies of the Roosevelt administration. The OCD was headed by Mayor of New York City Fiorello LaGuardia from 1941 to 1942, and then by James M. Landis. The agency was tasked with coordinating and monitoring the volunteer defense activities of American men, women, and children on the home front. By the summer of 1942, there were about 10 million volunteers and OCD events included air-raid drills, salvage drives, and planting Victory Gardens. Fauset was hired to specifically look at African American efforts after the OCD had been criticized for its lack of racial inclusiveness. Fauset worked on the recruitment of African American civilians to the war effort. She urged communities across the nation to allow black members to participate in local civil defense planning. She addressed complaints of racial discrimination among black servicemen such as their exclusion from United Service Organizations canteens and combat missions, and she spoke out against segregation in the U.S. military. She was also tasked with appointing race relations advisers to the nine civilian defense regions in the U.S., but was only able to appoint advisers to five regions, not including the Deep South. Additionally, Fauset advised both the First Lady and Fiorello LaGuardia on race relations.

By some historical accounts, Fauset is considered a member of President Roosevelt's "Black Cabinet" that promoted civil rights for African Americans. Despite her ten-year involvement with the Democratic Party, Fauset broke away after questioning the Party's inaction on supporting African American voters and civil rights, and becoming discontented with the Roosevelt administration's slow record on civil rights and the President's discouragement of meetings about racial matters during the 1944 presidential campaign. Fauset became a member of the Republican National Committee's division on Negro Affairs in 1944 and publicly endorsed Thomas E. Dewey, the Republican presidential candidate. Her announcement received mixed reactions among African American newspapers. Dewey would eventually be defeated by Roosevelt in the elections.

=== Global efforts ===
Fauset continued her work after World War II and turned her attention to more global issues. In 1945, she helped found the United Nations Council in Philadelphia (later, the World Affairs Council) and remained an officer till 1950. She continued to volunteer for the organization years after. Fauset also attended the founding of the United Nations in San Francisco in 1950.

During the 1950s she traveled extensively to Africa, India, and the Middle East. She befriended independence leaders and future presidents Kwame Nkrumah of Ghana and Nnamdi Azikiwe of Nigeria, as well as Ralph Bunche, an African American diplomat and 1950 Nobel Peace Prize winner. Beginning in 1955, Fauset lobbied for the opening of an Africa House in New York, a proposed forum for black and white Americans to learn about the continent by interacting with Africans.

== Later life ==
In 1955, Fauset was awarded a second Meritorious Service Medal from the Commonwealth of Pennsylvania. During her later years, Fauset lived in New York City. She died in her sleep while visiting Philadelphia on March 27, 1965.

Some of Fauset's surviving papers and photos are housed in an archive collection at Howard University. Her influential accomplishments for African American people earned her a Pennsylvania Historical and Museum Commission Marker. It was unveiled in 1991 and can be found outside her old home on 5402 Vine Street in Philadelphia. The memorial reads "The first Black woman elected to a state legislature in the U.S., Fauset, who lived here, won her seat in the Pennsylvania House of Representatives, 1938. She later served as a Civil Defense race relations advisor under Franklin D. Roosevelt."
