= International Workers Order =

Insurance, mutual benefit and fraternal organization

International Workers Order (IWO)
- דער אינטערנאציאנאלער ארבעטער ארדן
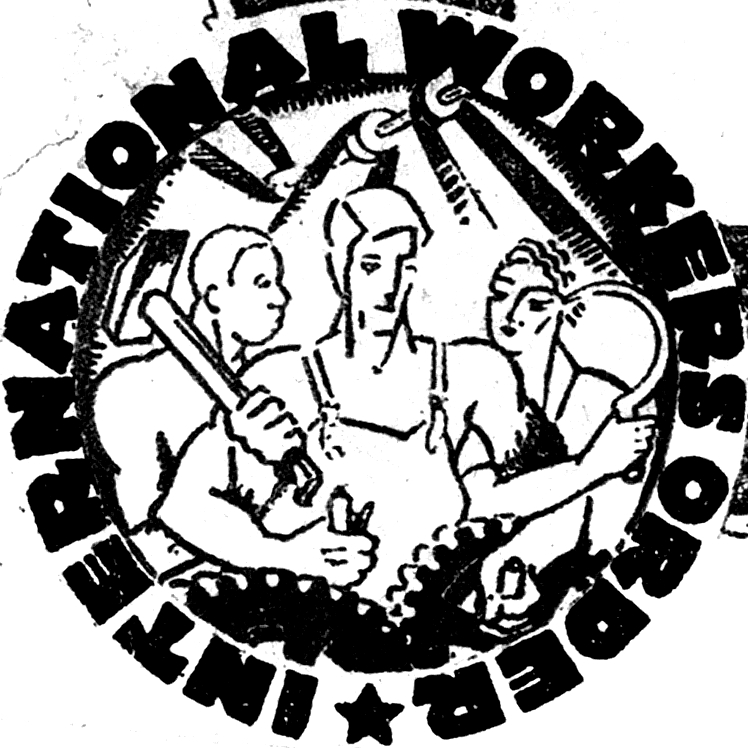
- Original IWO logo (1930–1939)
- Predecessor: The Workers Circle
- Formation: 1930
- Founded at: New York City
- Dissolved: 1954
- Type: Fraternal organization, mutual aid society
- Headquarters: New York City
- Services: Insurance, mutual benefit
- Members: 3,000–5,000 (1930); 67,000 (1935); 141,000 (1938); 155,000 (1941)
- Secretary General: Max Bedacht
- President: William Weiner
- General Secretary (1930-1935): Rubin Saltzman
- General Secretary (1935-1954): Max Bedacht
- Affiliations: Communist Party USA

The International Workers Order (IWO) was an insurance, mutual benefit and fraternal organization founded in 1930 and disbanded in 1954 as the result of legal action undertaken by the state of New York in 1951 on the grounds that the organization was too closely linked to the Communist Party. At its height in the years immediately following World War II, the IWO reached nearly 200,000 members and provided low-cost health and life insurance, medical and dental clinics, and supported foreign-language newspapers, cultural and educational activities. The organization also operated a summer camp and cemeteries for its members.

== Organizational history ==
=== Factional war in the Arbeter Ring (1920s) ===
The International Workers Order (IWO) began as the byproduct of a split of The Workmen's Circle (Der Arbeter Ring, now called The Workers Circle), a Jewish mutual benefit society formed to a great degree by Yiddish-speaking immgrants from Eastern and Central Europe, of social democratic coloration. Principal functions of the Workmen's Circle included the provision of unemployment insurance, medical insurance, and life insurance for its members, as well as providing a setting for the discussion of social problems at its meetings. During the factionally charged political climate of the American Left in the 1920s, a parallel Communist fraternal benefit society emerged—the IWO.

The origins of the split that established the IWO date back to 1922. In February of that year, a nominating conference of the Arbeter Ring was held, at which a new Executive Committee was to be nominated. Nearly 200 delegates attended this conference, which was dominated by adherents of the Socialist Party of America (SPA), who prevented adherents of the Communist movement from gaining a single seat on the Credentials Committee. A spontaneous walkout of Left Wing delegates resulted.

In May 1922, the Workmen's Circle held its 22nd Convention at Toronto. This gathering was attended by 26 Left Wing delegates out of a total of 138. These two fractions battled over two resolutions of the executive committee: one against Soviet Russia for its judicial action against the Socialist Revolutionaries and other political opponents of the regime, and a second directed against the Workers Party of America and its Yiddish language organ, the Morgen Freiheit (Morning Freedom). While the SPA-influenced delegates held the day, a "Protest Convention" quickly organized in response to the resolutions of the 22nd Convention. This was held on June 2, 1922, and attended by 338 delegates, representing 235 branches of the organization from 23 states.

The National Executive Committee of the Workmen's Circle struck back, dissolving the Left Wing-dominated Boston District Committee and removing several Left Wingers from positions of authority in the organization. The Left Wing found itself in a majority position in Minnesota, Missouri, Virginia, Texas, and Ontario, inspiring the National Executive Committee to dissolve the five state organizations, as well as various Left Wing branches. Despite the rough treatment, the Left Wing resisted splitting the organization, instead opting to continue its fight within the Workman's Circle organization itself. This tactic was followed through 1925.

The 1925 Convention of the Arbeter Ring was particularly bitter. Nearly 1,000 delegates were in attendance, of whom approximated one-fourth supported a program of the Left Wing calling for the Workmen's Circle to become an actively political organization. The Left Wing fought relentlessly to win the right to read a 10-minute statement to the convention, declaring that "to our shame, the Workmen's Circle, our Order, lately has become and out-and-out toll and weapon in the hands of the reactionary element in the Jewish working class movement." A two-day "National Protest Conference" was held in response to the Socialist-dominated convention, which was attended by the representatives of 191 branches. The conference organized itself into a "Left Wing Alliance" and declared that it would fight "against the terror of the Right Wing machine" and "for the non-party [i.e. non-Socialist Party] character of the Workmen's Circle." Aid to the children's school movement, a pet project of the Left, was pledged.

The National Executive Committee of the Workmen's Circle responded to the organization of the Left Wing Alliance predictably, expelling 64 branches with a membership of close to 15,000. This put the executive committee of the Alliance in a precarious situation. Rather than risk "suicide" through a premature split, the executive committee instructed its branches to comply with various requests of the NEC to resign from the Alliance or be expelled. A split was thereby narrowly averted. The NEC adopted a lengthy process for reinstatement of expelled branches, drawing out the process over months and demoralizing the Left Wing.

As the Communist movement became more radical at the end of the 1920s, following the doctrine of the so-called Third Period of new revolutionary upheaval, the bad marriage of Socialists and Communists in the Arbeter Ring crashed upon the rocks. The 1929 Convention attempted to eliminate the Left Wing from participation. The gathering was addressed by a guest speaker, Victor Chernov, leader of the Russian Socialist Revolutionary Party (PSR), considered a notorious counterrevolutionary by the Communists of the day. In the supercharged environment, it was charged that a physical attack was made on the reporter of the Communist Party's Yiddish daily, the Freiheit. The convention renewed the two controversial Toronto resolutions of 1922 and formally approved the action of the NEC in suppressing the Left Wing movement in the Workmen's Circle.

A split was at hand. On October 11, 1929, a three-day "National Conference of Minority Groups of the Workmen's Circle" gathered in New York City, attended by 193 delegates, representing 108 branches and 23 minority factions of branches. These delegates unanimously decided to leave the Workmen's Circle and build a new explicitly working class order. A manifesto issued by the conference declared:

"The time has come when everyone who takes the interests of the workers seriously must shake off the dust of the Workmen's Circle. The Workmen's Circle, originally organized under the banner of the class struggle, writing into its program the abolition of the capitalist order...has been transformed in the past few years into an instrument of capitalist politics.
"There was not one single important occasion in the life of the Jewish workers in the last 7 or 8 years when the leadership of the Workmen's Circle did not line up with the enemies of the working class. The counterrevolutionary physiognomy of the Workmen's Circle is most clearly expressed in its attitude toward the Soviet Union, the only proletarian state in the world, the pride and crown of achievement of all class conscious workers throughout the entire world."

=== Establishment of the IWO ===
IWO President William Weiner (right) shakes hands with National Maritime Union President Joseph Curran at an anti-Dies Committee rally at Manhattan Center, April 24, 1940

The first General Secretary of the IWO was Rubin Saltzman and the first President was William Weiner, both "open and prominent" members of the Communist Party USA.

The IWO described itself in the following manner in its "Declaration of Principles":

The IWO provides sick, disability and death benefits. It organizes for its members medical aid and other forms of fraternal services. It pledges aid and comfort to its members in case of need. The ranks of the International Workers Order and its societies are open to all regardless of sex, nationality, race, color, creed or political affiliation.

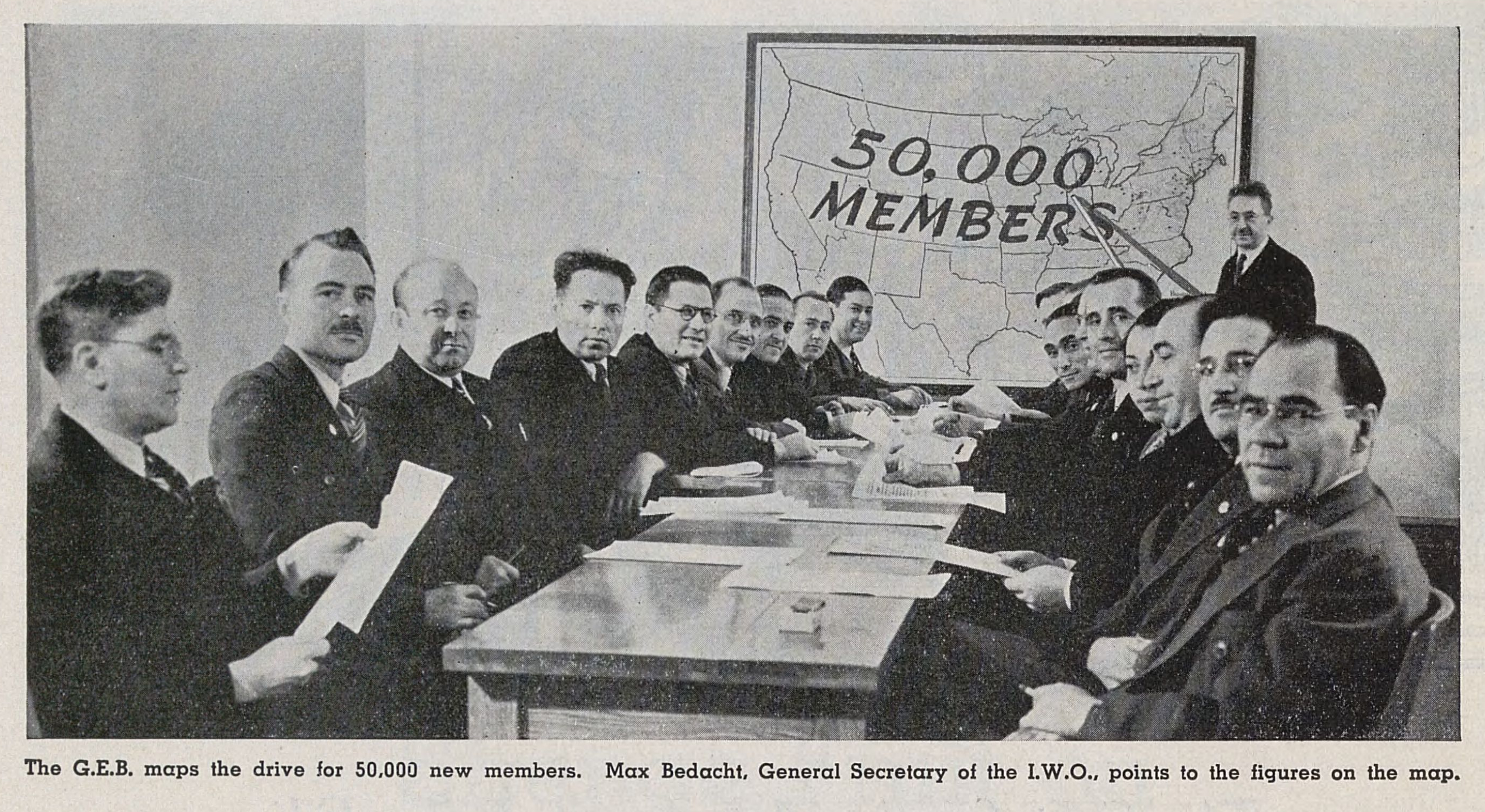
The General Executive Board of the IWO c. March 1939. Standing in the back is Max Bedacht.

Scholar Robert M. Zecker describes the IWO as a "mutual self-insurance society." The IWO provided very low cost term life insurance, coverage which could be supplemented with additional protection against sickness. The Order did not employ sales representatives and paid no commissions on policies sold. For many, the IWO took over the social functions associated with the Communist Party's language federations, which had lessened in importance throughout the decade of the 1920s. Different national sections of the IWO published news in their own languages, organized singing societies, sports teams, marching bands, dance companies, and theater groups.

The IWO grew rapidly, from a tiny organization of 3,000 to 5,000 members at the time of formation in 1930, the organization rocketed to a membership of 67,000 by 1935. A significant chunk of its membership were Jewish and non-English speakers. 31.4% were Yiddish speakers with Ukrainian, Hungarian, Slovak and Russian language speakers being the next largest respectively on foreign language speakers, while only 8.9% were English language speakers.

By its third convention on May 6–11, 1935, Max Bedacht had become IWO general secretary. By 1938 it had grown to over 141,000.

While the IWO aggressively promoted the Communist Party's program and policies to its members, one scholarly observer has concluded:

In reality, most members were attracted to the low cost and nondiscriminatory availability of insurance and the willingness to take on as insureds anyone who worked, even those who worked in dangerous or high risk employment, as well as the mutual aid benefits of the Order.... That it was also dedicated to left-wing, 'progressive,' or indeed Party-supported causes and rhetoric cannot and should not be ignored or glossed over; nevertheless, for most of its members, the IWO met pragmatic needs in an economic and social framework.

Max Bedacht presents a $500 check on behalf of the IWO to representatives of the Ethiopian World Federation, November 14, 1941

As World War II approached, membership in the IWO continued to climb. At the end of September 1941, the organization claimed a membership of 155,000 and assets approaching $1.9 million. According to the testimony of IWO General Secretary Max Bedacht, these members had organized into over 19,000 branches and generated an income for the organization of over $1 million per year.

=== Post-war years ===
At its height in the years immediately following World War II, the IWO had almost 200,000 members and provided low-cost health and life insurance, medical and dental clinics, and supported foreign-language newspapers, cultural and educational activities. The IWO offered insurance to all working people at the same rate regardless of race or occupation and was, at the time, the only service provider where African Americans could obtain insurance at the same rate as others and also the only place where workers in dangerous occupations such as coal mining could obtain insurance at a rate equivalent to other occupations.

The IWO also ran a Jewish summer camp, Camp Kinderland and the racially integrated camp Wo-Chi-Ca. Additionally the IWO owned and operated cemeteries throughout the US and Canada, a common practice among left wing Jewish mutual-aid organizations like the Farband and the Workmen's Circle.

While the leadership of IWO sections were members of the Communist Party, most of the IWO's rank-and-file members were not party members.

The IWO was made up of a total of 15 sections, the largest section of which was the Jewish section representing one-third of the membership of the IWO and which in 1944 was renamed the Jewish People's Fraternal Order. There was also an English section and 13 other language sections including the Hungarian Workmen's Sick, Benevolent, and Educational Federation; the Ukrainian-American Fraternal Union; the Carpatho-Russian National Society; the (Spanish) Cervantes Society Mutualista Obrera Puertorriqueña; the (Italian) Garibaldi American Fraternal Society; the Hellenic-American Brotherhood; the Serbian-American Federation; the Russian American Mutual Aid Society; the Slovak Workers Society; the Polonia Society; the Rumanian American Fraternal Society; the Czech Workers Society and the Finnish American Mutual Aid Society (descended from the Finnish Socialist Federation).

=== Demise ===
As early as 1944, the Special Committee on Un-American Activities of the US House of Representatives (best known as the Dies Committee) attacked the IWO as a "huge patronage machine furnishing positions for a host of Communist functionaries, who serve as the party's controlling commissars within the organization." The Dies Committee expressed its confidence that "a comparison made in each local area will bear out the charge that the personnel of the Communist Party and the International Workers Order interlock closely." In addition to General Secretaries Saltzman and Bedacht, those explicitly singled out by the Dies Committee for membership in the Communist Party while holding an executive position in the IWO were President William Weiner, Executive Secretary Herbert Benjamin, General Executive Board members Moissaye J. Olgin and Max Steinberg, and assistant to the General Secretary Rebecca Grecht, among others.

As a financial support mechanism of the Communist Party, the IWO came under concerted government attack during the Cold War which erupted following the termination of World War II. The U.S. Attorney General placed the IWO on its list of subversive organizations in 1947. Though financially solvent and conservatively managed, the New York State Insurance Department contended that, since the IWO was engaged in political activity, which was prohibited to insurance organizations, it placed its members' interests in jeopardy, leading ultimately to its liquidation in 1954 by order of the New York State Insurance Department.

== Legacy ==
Following the demise of the IWO, Camp Kinderland became an independent entity and the Jewish People's Fraternal Order reconstituted itself as the Jewish Cultural Clubs and Societies without the mutual benefit component of JPFO. A Canadian equivalent of the JPFO, the United Jewish Peoples' Order, still exists as does the Association of United Ukrainian Canadians. During the COVID-19 pandemic, the IWO received mention as a mutual aid society that might bear revisit for applicability to the growing number of gig workers, left out of a 20th-century system whose benefits to employees depends on full-time employment (also considered for mutual aid societies more broadly), though others have questioned the IWO's contemporary relevance if based on intersectionality."

== Conventions ==
- Founding Convention – May 1931
- 2nd Convention – Chicago, June 1933
- 3rd Convention – New York City, May 5–11, 1935
- 4th Convention – Pittsburgh, PA, April 23–30, 1938
- 5th Convention – New York City, June 1940
- 6th Convention – New York City, July 2–7, 1944
- 7th Convention – New York City, June 12–19, 1947
