= McCarthyism and antisemitism =

The role of antisemitism during McCarthyism (also known as the Second Red Scare) has been noted and debated since the 1940s. In particular, the role of antisemitism during the trial of Julius and Ethel Rosenberg has been debated both inside and outside of the Jewish community. The majority of the Hollywood Ten who were imprisoned following the House Un-American Activities Committee (HUAC) were Jewish, with some critics alleging antisemitism. Antisemitism among individuals involved with HUAC has also been noted, including antisemitic Congressional testimony from Martin Dies Jr. and John E. Rankin. During McCarthyism and the Rosenberg trial, many Jewish organizations remained silent concerning or agreed with the prosecution of the Rosenbergs or with McCarthyism in general. Although accused of antisemitism, Joseph McCarthy himself accused others of antisemitism for their criticisms of his investigators Roy Cohn and G. David Schine.

== About ==
Joseph McCarthy had very little support among American Jews, who were overwhelmingly anti-McCarthy. Many Jewish organizations were critical of McCarthyism, including the Anti-Defamation League (ADL). However, while sometimes critical of McCarthyism and red-baiting during the 1950s, the ADL expelled Jewish communists from the organization, cooperated with the House Un-American Activities Committee, and supported the execution of Julius and Ethel Rosenberg.

The legal historian Morton Horwitz has written that the Rosenberg trial and McCarthyism "touched every raw nerve; every terror of renewed genocidal anti-Semitism, every nightmare that Nazism had embodied". In The Book of Daniel, E. L. Doctorow wrote "Had not McCarthy made a speech describing the great battle between international atheistic communism and Christianity? There was no question in anyone's mind where the Jews belonged according to Joe McCarthy."

According to Indiana University South Bend professor Benjamin Balthaser, academics including Ellen Schrecker, Joel Kovel, and James Ziegler have written that antisemitism within McCarthyist anti-communism was partly inspired by the 1930s speeches of the right-wing activist Charles Coughlin (Father Coughlin). Balthaser has stated that his own grandparents, Jewish members of the Communist Party, referred to the Second Red Scare as a "pogrom".

=== Joseph McCarthy ===
In 1953, a group of Jewish organizations issued a statement denouncing Joseph McCarthy for allegedly making "false charges of anti-Semitism", after he characterized critics of his investigators Roy Cohn and G. David Schine as antisemitic.

==== Malmedy massacre trial ====
In an incident for which he would be widely criticized, McCarthy lobbied for the commutation of death sentences given to a group of Waffen-SS soldiers convicted of war crimes for carrying out the 1944 Malmedy massacre of American prisoners of war. McCarthy was critical of the convictions because the German soldiers' confessions were allegedly obtained through torture during the interrogations. He argued that the U.S. Army was engaged in a coverup of judicial misconduct, but never presented any evidence to support the accusation. Shortly after this, a 1950 poll of the Senate press corps voted McCarthy "the worst U.S. senator" currently in office. McCarthy biographer Larry Tye has written that antisemitism factored into McCarthy's outspoken views on Malmedy, and noted that McCarthy frequently used anti-Jewish slurs. In this and McCarthy's other characteristics, such as the enthusiastic support he received from antisemitic politicians like Ku Klux Klansman Wesley Swift and his tendency, according to friends, to refer to his copy of Mein Kampf, stating, "That's the way to do it," McCarthy's critics characterize him as driven by antisemitism. It is important, however, to note that Tye notes that it was not, in his opinion, antisemitism alone that led to McCarthy's actions regarding the Malmedy massacre. It was later found that McCarthy had received "evidence" of the false torture claims from Rudolf Aschenauer, a prominent Neo-Nazi agitator who often served as a defense attorney for Nazi war criminals, such as Einsatzgruppen commander Otto Ohlendorf.

=== House Un-American Activities Committee ===
The journalist Michael Freedland has alleged that HUAC was motivated by antisemitism. Freedland has cited as antisemitic HUAC's disproportionate targeting of American Jews involved in the film industry, as well as implicitly or overtly antisemitic speeches given during HUAC, such as Congressman John Rankin's speech wherein he stated the Jewish birth names of several Hollywood figures, including Danny Kaye, Eddie Cantor, Edward G. Robinson, and Melvyn Douglas.

In 1939, the neo-Nazi activist George Van Horn Moseley testified before HUAC for five hours about a "Jewish Communist conspiracy" to take control of the US government. Moseley was supported by Donald Shea of the American Gentile League, whose statement was deleted from the public record as the committee found it so objectionable.

=== Immigration and Nationality Act of 1952 ===
The Immigration and Nationality Act of 1952 was debated and passed in the context of Cold War-era fears and suspicions of infiltrating Soviet and communist spies and sympathizers within American institutions and federal government. Anticommunist sentiment associated with the McCarthyism in the United States led restrictionists to push for selective immigration to preserve national security. Senator Pat McCarran (D-Nevada), the chairman of the Senate Judiciary Committee, proposed an immigration bill to maintain the status quo in the United States and to safeguard the country from Communism, "Jewish interests", and undesirables that he deemed as external threats to national security. His immigration bill included restrictive measures such as increased review of potential immigrants, stepped-up deportation, and more stringent naturalization procedures. The bill also placed a preference on economic potential, special skills, and education.

McCarran's legacy has often been characterized as marked by antisemitism, xenophobia, and racism and he actively opposed efforts to permit survivors of the Holocaust to come to the United States.

=== Rosenberg trial ===
Many people both inside and outside of the Jewish community have alleged that the Rosenberg trial was motivated by or tinged by antisemitism, including internalized antisemitism among American Jews. Many Jewish organizations in the United States were worried that they would be smeared by allegations of Judeo-Bolshevism and were supportive of the execution of the Rosenbergs. Jewish Communists, including the publication Jewish Life as well as the Rosenbergs themselves, compared American Jews who supported the execution to the Judenrat, Jews who collaborated with Nazis during the Holocaust. One non-Jewish member of the Rosenberg's jury later stated their view that because the judge, defendants, defense, and prosecution during the trial were mostly Jewish that they "felt good that this was strictly a Jewish show. It was Jew against Jew. It wasn't the Christians hanging the Jews." They added their view that "Any other judge would have been more lenient than Kaufman." During her trial, Ethel Rosenberg alleged that "This is the way the Judenrat performed for the Nazis in the Warsaw Ghetto" following a Court of Appeals ruling written by Jerome Frank.

The ADL rejected accusations that the Rosenberg trial was influenced by antisemitism. Judge Irving Kaufman, who ordered the execution of the Rosenbergs, was a member of the ADL's Civil Rights committee. In 1952, Lucy Dawidowicz wrote in Commentary that Jewish communists viewed the ADL and other mainstream Jewish organizations as "reactionary, fascist-collaborating oligarchs and conspiratorial enemies both of democracy and their own oppressed people." In 1952, the ADL and other Jewish organizations released a joint statement rejecting the claims of the National Committee to Secure Justice in the Rosenberg Case that the trial was motivated by antisemitism. The statement characterized the Rosenberg Committee as trying to "inject the false issue of anti-Semitism". A 1952 ADL document claimed that "The Communists, in their worldwide propaganda attack defending the convicted atom spies, Ethel and Julius Rosenberg, provide a vivid example of the technique of falsely charging anti-Semitism to hide conspiracy."

== See also ==
- Anti-communism
- Donald Trump and antisemitism
- Immigration and Nationality Act of 1952
- Jewish Bolshevism
- Jewish People's Fraternal Order
- Self-hating Jew
