= Beatrice Murphy =

American poet and advocate for disabled people

Beatrice M. Murphy
- Murphy in 1970
- Born: June 25, 1908; Monessen, Pennsylvania, United States
- Died: May 12, 1992 (aged 83); Washington D.C., United States
- Other name: Beatrice Campbell
- Known for: Negro Bibliographic and Research Center
- Children: 1 son

Beatrice M. Murphy Campbell (25 June 1908 – 12 May 1992) was an American poet and editor known for being the founder of the Negro Bibliographic and Research Center as well as the editor of its journal, Bibliographic Survey: The Negro in Print. All of her published works are under the name Beatrice M. Murphy.

== Early life and education ==
Murphy was born in Monessen, Pennsylvania to Benjamin and Maude Murphy. She had a brother, Selmo. She moved to Washington, D.C. in 1914 where she spent the rest of her life. She graduated from Dunbar High School in 1928.

== Career ==
Murphy was a columnist and editor at the Washington Tribune in the early 1930s. In 1938, after converting to Catholicism, she became book review editor for the Afro-American. She worked as a secretary at Catholic University and was joint owner of a circulating library and stenography shop. She was a columnist for the Associated Negro Press and wrote poetry and reviews for many periodicals. She worked for the Office of Price Administration in the 1940s and 1950s and later at the Veterans Administration. She was suspended without pay from her job as procurement clerk in 1954 for supposedly having joined a subversive organization, the Washington Bookshop Association. She fought the charges—having never joined the organization but attended a pair of public lectures there—and was reinstated at her job which she retired from on disability in 1959.

Murphy's first poetry anthology, Negro Voices, was published in 1938. She published two additional anthologies Ebony Rhythm in 1948, and New Negro Voices in 1970 which featured works by Nikki Giovanni and Carolyn Rodgers. Her anthologies published and preserved poetry by Black Americans that were mostly not published by major journals. She also wrote poetry books including the titles Love is a terrible thing; Get with it, Lord; and The rocks cry out. Her poems were also published in The Crisis and other publications.

The Negro Bibliographic and Research Center was founded in 1965 and was a nonprofit and "nonpolitical" organization which published bibliographies and provided research "...to help meet the reading public's growing interest in the vast amount of written material on the Negro." The organization was established at 117 R Street NE in Washington D.C. and consisted of Murphy as Director, as well as Myrtle Henry and Jessie Roy. The organization's publication Bibliographic Survey: The Negro in Print, was published between 1965 and 1971. The organization was later renamed The Minority Research Center Inc.

In 1977, the Beatrice M. Murphy Foundation was created by her friends to encourage the collection and dissemination of books by and about Black people. Murphy also donated 1700 books from her personal collection to improve DC Public Library's Black Studies Center holdings.

== Disability advocacy ==
In 1941, Murphy was diagnosed with an arthritic and inoperable curvature of the spine necessitating the use of a body cast. When she began losing her sight in the 1960s, she worked with her ophthalmologist to be a peer counselor to assist others who were losing their vision. She served on advisory committees of the American Foundation for the Blind and the Columbia Lighthouse for the Blind.

== Personal life ==
She had one son, Alvin Murphy, born on February 22, 1930, who died in 1984.

== Death ==
She died on May 12, 1992, of heart disease. Her papers are held by D.C. Public Library.
