= Black Opals =

African American literary magazine

== History ==
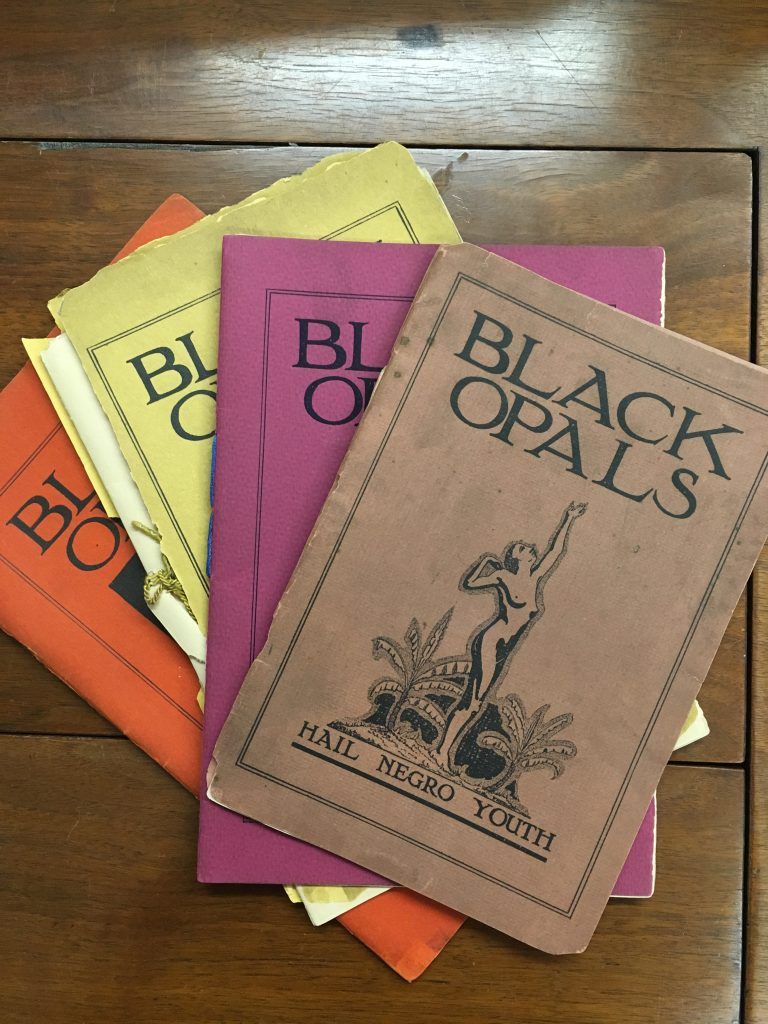
Black Opals literary journals

Black Opals were African American literary journals that were published in Philadelphia between the years of 1927 and 1928. Although it produced only four issues, the journal remains an important part of the Harlem Renaissance era. It was very impactful to the black Americans during a time where they didn't have the same outreach to reach further .These journals were very impactful because many black writers were not allowed in white spaces due to racism and systemic issues. If these black writers were allowed in these spaces, it could've made these journals gain more recognition. These journals helped push black creativity further and it influenced others to do so, such as musicians, artists,and it even impacted black film making. It was co founded by Arthur Huff Fauset and Nellie Rathbone Bright, who were both heavily involved in education and literary spaces. These journals didn't have a longer run due to budget costs and the writers, who were the main contributors, careers had grew further and the writers wanted to break free and focus on their own individual careers that was growing due to how impactful these journals were . These journals grew during a time where African American writers were looking for platforms to show off their voices and make a change .Even though most of the Harlem Renaissance was centered in New York, Black Opals demonstrated that similar creative movements were also thriving in other cities like Philadelphia.The journal reflected the writing and artistic energy of the period, offering a space for outreach and expression.

== Black Opals and the Harlem Renaissance ==
The Harlem Renaissance became what it became which is known as the Harlem renaissance as a result from the Great Migration, which was when six million African Americans fled from the south, north, and midwest to Harlem. They fled there for better job opportunities, education, and escape from racial violence and Jim Crow laws because Harlem didn't have many systemic laws there. Cities like New York, Chicago, and Detroit became cultural spaces where Black creativity heavily improved and expanded which was good for black Americans that wanted bigger opportunities and an escape from what they were dealing with in there previous cities .This movement encouraged African Americans to express pride in their identity and culture through writing, art, and music. However, opportunities for publication to where they would actually gain notoriety and bigger audiences were still limited because racism was heavily impacting black Americans . As a result, smaller journals like Black Opals were created to give Black writers and artists a voice. It helped give black Americans entertainment and happiness during a time were there were a lot of racial violence and systemic laws that directly affected black Americans. Philadelphia, with its growing Black middle class and strong community Harlem became a good place for the black opals to be created and started in.

== Content and Themes ==
Black Opals published a variety of creative entries which included poetry, short stories, essays, and visual art pieces. The journal often focused on discussing topics such as African American identity, racial pride, and social identity.These journals were a way for black Americans to talk about how they feel and been treated.These writers explored important issues such as inequality, cultural heritage, and the Black experience in America. Many writers used these journals as a way to express themselves through their talents. This showed the bigger picture of the Harlem Renaissance, where artists pushed society's exceptions of them and helped push black creativity during a time where they didn't feel seen or heard instead they felt ignored and outcast .

== Notable Creators ==
These journals featured contributions from several important African American writers and artists. Among them were Mae Virginia Cowdery, Jessie Redmon Fauset, Marita Bonner, and Gwendolyn B. Bennett. Each of these individuals brought something to the black opals .It included different perspectives and talents to the literacy journals each one of them had something to bring to the table they all were different but similar in their own ways which made these black opals so special. Jessie Redmon Fauset was already a well known literary writer and played a bigger role in shaping African American literature during the Harlem Renaissance.She was known as a writer for the crisis magazine in the late 1920s which was the naacp magazine which the naacp is very helpful to black Americans still to do this in focusing on systemic issues her being the writer for the naacp magazine was very helpful to the black opals because she already had some level of experience and she is known in black works . Marita Bonner and Gwendolyn B. Bennett contributed pieces that discussed the experiences of Black life in the 1920s. Allan Randall Freelon served as the illustrator, helping to shape the illustration of the journal .

== Impact and Significance ==
The impact that the black opals had is still relevant in today's society with new writers and rappers from Harlem. The great migration led thousands to flee to Harlem, being able to have their own businesses and communities. Systemic laws changed the way people saw black writers and it also was a major part of the Harlem renaissance movement. Black opals had sections of poems and storytelling that told how much pain black Americans were facing. It was an outlet for black writers and artists during a time when they were not allowed in major spaces because of their skin colour, so the creation of the black opals influenced black creativity and freedom of expression. Writers such as Langston Hughes and Zora Neale Hurston who had a major impact on the Harlem renaissance helped push the black opals to what they became. The legacy of these writers lives on as upcoming artists continue to show black creativity. Black opals influenced self expression and led others to tell their own stories and create more black spaces.

External links

- "Digital copies of all four issues of Black Opals". The Online Books Page.
