= Jessie Housley Holliman =

African-American artist and educator (1905–1984)

- Jessie Housley Holliman, c. 1930s
- Born: Jessie May Housley; March 27, 1905; St. Louis, Missouri
- Died: August 10, 1984 (aged 79); St. Louis, Missouri
- Resting place: Washington Park Cemetery; Berkeley, Missouri; 38.72977°N 90.34187°W
- Education: Sumner High School; School of the Art Institute of Chicago; Stowe Teachers College

Jessie Housley Holliman (née Jessie May Housley; May 27, 1905 – August 10, 1984) was an African-American educator, muralist, printmaker, and commercial artist active in St. Louis, Missouri from 1929 until 1949.

== Biography ==
Though very little is known about her early life, Jessie May Housley was born on March 27, 1905, in St. Louis, Missouri.

=== Education ===
Jessie remained a voracious learner and education advocate throughout her life, doing whatever was necessary to receive the schooling she desperately sought. Jessie graduated from Sumner High School, the first high school in Missouri built to serve African-American students, in 1925. Soon after high school she moved to Illinois and enrolled in the School of the Art Institute of Chicago, which she attended for the next three years. After receiving a healthy arts education, Jessie enrolled at Harris–Stowe State University (then Stowe Teachers College), a historically black public university in St. Louis. She remained at the school long enough to receive the training and qualifications necessary to teach art in K–12 schools in Missouri, a job she began soon after leaving the school. At around the same time, she was a regular attendee at free classes offered by local artist Joe Jones.

Jessie Housley Holliman was recorded as one several black students, and likely the only black woman, enrolled in classes at the Art Students League of New York in 1931. Other black artists that attended the school at around the same time included William Artis, Richmond Barthe, Beauford Delaney, Joseph Delaney, and Frank J. Dillon. While in New York City, Holliman also attended many art classes at Columbia University.

While working as a schoolteacher in St. Louis, Jessie decided to take her arts education even further by enrolling at the St. Louis School of Fine Arts at Washington University. Despite possessing more qualifications than necessary, she was promptly turned away and barred from enrollment as the school would not officially accept African-American graduate students until 1948. Rather than accept defeat, Holliman decided to do whatever was necessary to gain access to the art lessons. The school refused to accept her as a student so Jessie applied to work as a model for the same classes she had attempted to enroll in. She was successful and worked in the classes for several years, effectively obtaining the artistic knowledge she was denied.

=== Later life ===
On several occasions in her later years, Holliman's work was published in Proud magazine, a publication that addressed the needs of St. Louis' black community from 1971 until 1981. Issues containing contributions from Jessie are currently held in the collections of the University of Missouri, Washington University, and the State Historical Society of Missouri.

Jessie Housley Holliman died on August 10, 1984, in St. Louis, Missouri at the age of 79 following a lengthy illness. She is buried at Washington Park Cemetery in Berkeley, just outside of the city of St. Louis.

== Career ==
Jessie Housley Holliman taught visual arts to students at the Divoll Elementary School on Dayton Avenue in St. Louis for more than thirty–nine years. While working as a teacher, Jessie also freelanced as a commercial artist and fashion illustrator. She was especially known for creating the fashion advertisements for Kline's department store that ran in St. Louis area newspapers for many years. Holliman was known to be friends with numerous local artists and educators, including Julia Davis and Frederick Cornelius Alston. Holliman exhibited paintings in two exhibitions at the City Art Museum of St. Louis (Saint Louis Art Museum) in the 1940s. For the exhibition titled, "Paintings and Sculpture by Negro Artists in St. Louis and Elsewhere" (April–May 1949), the Homer G. Phillips Hospital lent its portrait of the institution's namesake, a prominent lawyer and politician. The portrait's current whereabouts are unknown.

=== Murals ===
In the mid–1930s, Holliman began studying the art of fresco murals. The Urban League of St. Louis hired her to paint a large mural titled Racial and Industrial Harmony, which has since been destroyed as the building was demolished. The mural depicted a black man and a white man shaking hands, framed by the Eads Bridge and surrounded by signs of technology and industry. A 1942 picture of the Urban League features the group proudly assembled in front of Holliman's mural before they departed for Washington, D.C. to attend one of the Marches on Washington. She also painted a mural titled Christ's Fellowship for Central Baptist Church in St. Louis, but the artwork was destroyed by a fire in 1971.

Unfortunately, only one of Holliman's murals is known to still exist: a 38–foot long fresco titled The Origin of Free Masonry. The mural depicts dozens of men acting out the history of freemasonry, and it is one of few true fresco murals that can be found in Missouri. The local freemasons commissioned the artwork in the late 1930s, and then-Senator Harry S. Truman traveled to St. Louis to dedicate the mural in September 1941. The mural can be found inside, above the entrance to the New Masonic Temple in St. Louis. The building was designed by the Eames & Young architecture firm with assistance from architect Albert B. Groves in 1926, and it was declared a historic city landmark in 1976. The mural was on public display until 2018, when the freemasons sold the building to a private buyer.

== Exhibitions ==
In 1929, Jessie's paintings titled Meditation was accepted to the Smithsonian's Exhibition of Paintings and Sculptures by Negro Artists alongside the work of several other artists from St. Louis.

In 1936, Jessie's pencil lithograph Left–Handed Ironer was awarded the grand prize in the Seventh Annual Art Exhibit of the St. Louis Urban League. The exhibition was held in the Arts and Crafts Hall of one of the largest department stores in St. Louis, Stix Baer & Fuller, where it was viewed by hundreds of both black and white visitors. The grand prize was awarded by local cartoonist E. Simms Campbell, who sponsored it in honor of his mother Mary who had been a longtime local schoolteacher. As a result of her win, Jessie was given the opportunity to illustrate the February 1936 cover of Opportunity: Journal of Negro Life, a monthly periodical that was published nationwide by the National Urban League. Holliman exhibited at least three additional black and white lithographs at the show titled Peace, Gossip, and Baachanalis. All four of her exhibited artworks were shared in a two–page feature article published in the following issue in March 1936. In addition to sharing Holliman's work, Opportunity regularly featured the art of many other prominent African-American women like Mary Tarleton Knollenberg, Georgette Seabrooke, Louise E. Jefferson, and Gwendolyn Bennett.

Jessie Housely Holliman exhibited prolifically in St. Louis and beyond for approximately twenty years between 1929 and 1949. The following is a small selection of her exhibit record:

- Exhibition of Fine Arts by American Negro Artists, Harmon Foundation and The Federal Council of Churches, New York City, 1929.
- Exhibition of Paintings and Sculptures by American Negro Artists, National Gallery of Art, Smithsonian Institution, Washington, D.C., 1929.
- Art Alliance of St. Louis Exhibition, 1929.
  - Awarded first prize for work in black and white.
- Exhibition of the Work of Negro Artists, St. Louis Public Library, 1937, 1938.
- St. Louis Post–Dispatch black and White Exhibition, 1930.
- Art Students League of New York Exhibition, 1931.
- Exhibition of Productions by Negro Artists, Harmon Foundation, New York City, 1933.
- Seventh Annual Art Exhibit of the St. Louis Urban League, Stix Baer & Fuller, 1936.
  - Awarded grand prize for Left–Handed Ironer lithograph.
- St. Louis Artists' Guild Drawings and Prints Exhibition, St. Louis Artists' Guild, 1938.
- Exhibition of the Work of Negro Artists, Saint Louis Art Museum, 1940.
- Negro Artists of the U.S. Exhibition, Saint Louis Art Museum, 1949.
