= Cubist Bird =

1966 painting by Sargent Claude Johnson

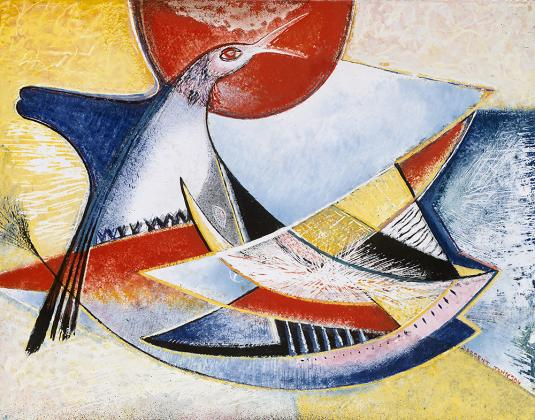
- Artist: Sargent Claude Johnson
- Year: 1967
- Type: Enamel on steel

The Cubist Bird is a painting by Sargent Claude Johnson, which was painted in the year 1966. It is an enamel on steel. It represents cubism, which was a popular style in the early to mid 1900s. This painting is shown with a bird extending its neck in front of a sun-like object. It also consists of a series vibrant colors, and many different triangles, and crescents.
