= Li Hei Di =

Chinese artist (born 1997)

- Born: 1997 (age 28–29); Shenyang, China
- Education: Chelsea College of Arts, Royal College of Art
- Known for: Painting, sculpture
- Movement: Contemporary art

Li Hei Di (Shenyang, China 1997) She is a contemporary Chinese multidisciplinary artist who currently lives and works in London, in the United Kingdom. Recognized for its visual language that blends Eastern folklore, Asian cinema, and Western art history, Li He gained international recognition for his oil paintings that explore repressed desire and identity queer and sensuality through abstract and biomorphic forms.

== Biography and Training ==
While still a teenager, she left home for a year-long student exchange program in Ohio, then studied at the Idyllwild Arts Academy in Southern California before continuing her studies at the Maryland Institute College of Art. She completed her bachelor's degree at Chelsea College of Arts, University of the Arts London, in 2020, and a master's degree in Painting at the Royal College of Art, also in London, in 2022.

== Exhibitions ==
Li experienced a rapid rise within the international contemporary art circuit, showcasing her work in major global galleries and art spaces:

- 2022: Tits at Dawn – Linseed Projects, Shanghai (Debut solo exhibition).
- 2023: Oscillating Womb – Michael Kohn Gallery, Los Angeles (US debut). That same year, her work was included in the group exhibitions Uncanny Valley at Gagosian in Hong Kong, and Home Is Where the Haunt Is at the X Museum in Beijing.
- 2024: 700 Nights of Winter – Pippy Houldsworth Gallery, London (First European solo show). In the same year, she participated in the group shows Abstraction (re)creation - 20 under 40 at Le Consortium (Dijon, France) and Wild at the Metropolitan Museum of Manila (Philippines). She was named to the Forbes 30 Under 30 Asia list in the Arts category and signed global representation with Pace Gallery.
- 2025: Tongues of Flare – Pace Gallery, Hong Kong (First solo exhibition with the gallery). During the same period, she presented her first institutional solo exhibition at the Pond Society in Shanghai.
