= Robert W. Deiz =

American Tuskegee Airman fighter pilot (1919–1992)

- Born: Robert William Deiz; June 17, 1919; Portland, Oregon, US
- Died: April 6, 1992 (aged 70); Columbus, Ohio, US
- Resting place: Arlington National Cemetery
- Education: University of Oregon
- Occupations: Military officer; fighter pilot
- Years active: 1942–1961

Robert William Deiz (June 17, 1919 – April 6, 1992) was a U.S. Army Air Force/U.S. Air Force officer, prominent combat fighter pilot, and Flight A leader with the 332nd Fighter Group's 99th Fighter Squadron, a component of the Tuskegee Airmen. He was one of the 1,007 documented Tuskegee Airmen Pilots.

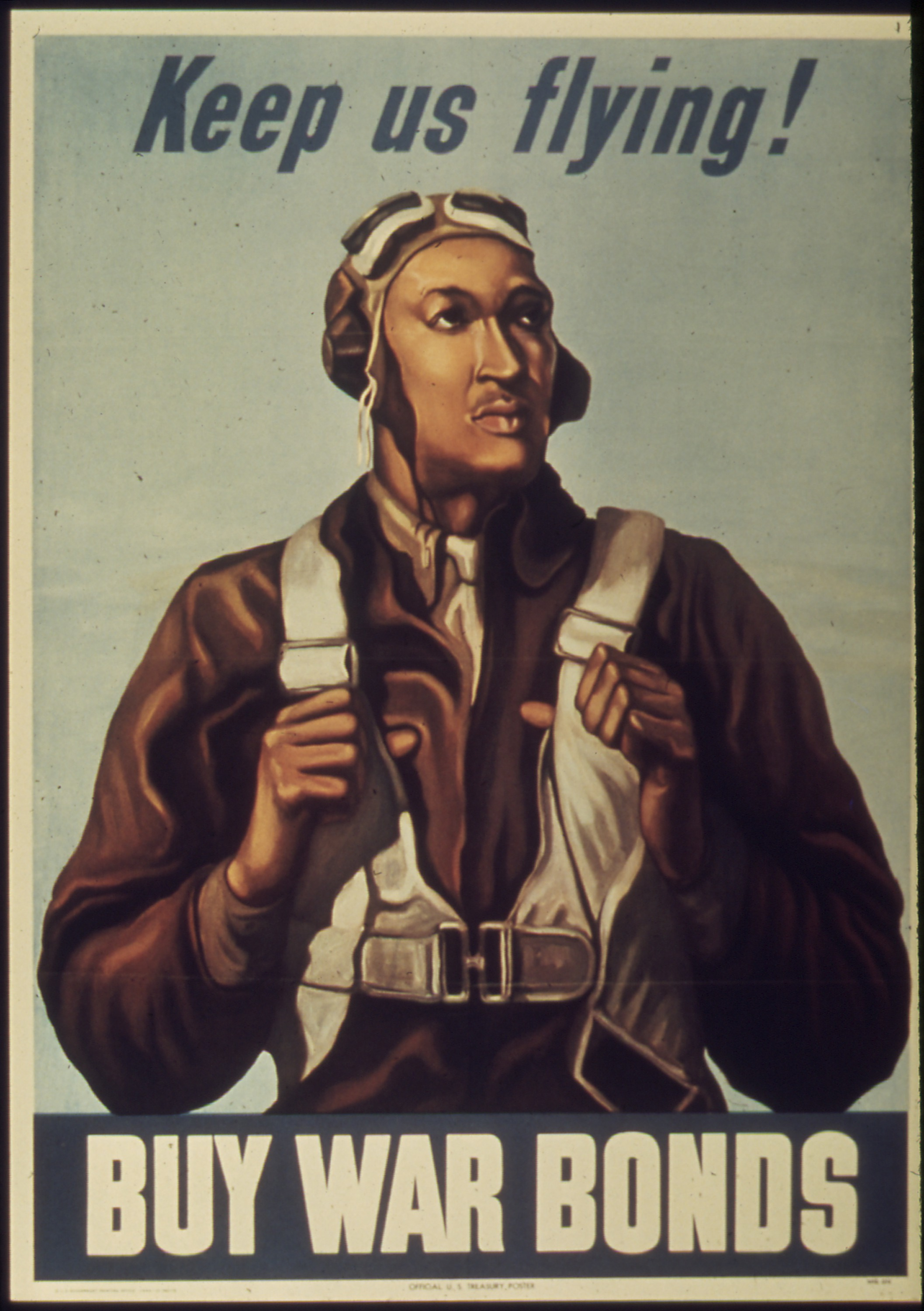

One of the most famous of the Tuskegee Airmen, Deiz is best known as the face of the popular 1943 “Keep Us Flying” World War II War Bonds poster created by Betsy Graves Reyneau, a white artist known for her portraits of prominent African Americans that circulated as part of the Harmon Foundation's traveling exhibition in the 1940s. Originally, Reyneau visited Tuskegee Institute in Tuskegee, Alabama, to create a portrait of famed scientist George Washington Carver.

== Early life, family, education ==
Deiz was born on June 17, 1919, in Portland, Oregon. His younger brother, Carl Deiz, was a Lieutenant and a Documented Member of the Tuskegee Airmen who served in Tuskegee, Alabama.

In 1943 before his deployment with the 99th Fighter Squadron, Deiz married Ruby Lee Butler Deiz (1920–2012). They had one son, Robert E. Deiz, and two grandsons.

Deiz attended Portland, Oregon's Franklin High School where he played horn and double bass at school and in the Portland Junior Symphony. He was also a track & field star, setting several records. After graduating from Franklin in 1937, Deiz attended the University of Oregon for two years. At Oregon, Deiz became a track & field star, setting records in the 100-yard dash, the 220-yard race and relay races. He also continued to play horn and double bass as a member of the University of Oregon Orchestra.

Prior to World War II in the late 1930s, Diez enrolled in the Civilian Pilot Training Program at Swan Island in Portland, Oregon, receiving his pilot's license.

== Military career ==
After graduation from the University of Oregon, Deiz joined the U.S. Army Air Corps. On September 6, 1942, Deiz graduated from the Tuskegee Flight School's Single Engine Section Class SE-42-H, earning his wings and a commission as a 2nd Lieutenant. The U.S. Army Air Corps assigned Deiz to the 99th Fighter Squadron.

During World War II, Deiz flew 93 missions.

On January 27, 1944, Deiz shot down an enemy German Focke-Wulf Fw 190, earning his first kill as a combat fighter pilot. The next day, Deiz earned his 2nd kill after shooting down another enemy German Focke-Wulf Fw 190. After returning to the United States, Deiz became a B-25 aircraft instructor at Tuskegee.

Deiz served as a model for the popular 1943 “Keep Us Flying” World War II War Bonds poster created by Betsy Graves Reyneau, a white artist known for her portraits of prominent African Americans that circulated as part of the Harmon Foundation's traveling exhibition in the 1940s. Originally, Reyneau was in Tuskegee to create a portray of famed scientist George Washington Carver.

After the war, Deiz served as a test pilot, becoming one of the first pilots to fly a jet aircraft. He also attended the Army Command and General Staff School in Fort Leavenworth, Kansas. Across U.S. Air Force assignments, Deiz continued to perform as a member of various community orchestras.

In 1959, Deiz graduated from the University of Omaha.

In 1961, Deiz retired from the U.S. Air Force in Columbus, Ohio, with the rank of Major after 20 years in the military.

== Post-military life ==
After retiring from the military, Deiz worked in electronics at North American Aviation for three years. After working as a parole officer for three years, Deiz served as a parole supervisor for 17 years. He retired in the early 1980s.

Diez lived in Columbus, Ohio, for 30 years until his death.

== Death ==
On April 6, 1992, Deiz suffered a heart attack and died after attending an American Cancer Society meeting in Columbus, Ohio.

== Legacy ==
In 2004, the Oregon Flying Hall of Fame posthumously inducted Diaz in a ceremony at the Evergreen Aviation Museum in McMinnville, Oregon. Deiz's widow, Ruby, and son represented him.

== See also ==
- Executive Order 9981
- List of Tuskegee Airmen
- List of Tuskegee Airmen Cadet Pilot Graduation Classes
- Military history of African Americans
