= William Farrow =

William Farrow may refer to:

- Bill Farrow (1918–2003), American basketball player
- William G. Farrow (1918–1942), United States Army Air Corps officer
- William H. Farrow (1893–1946), British World War I flying ace
- William McKnight Farrow (1885–1967), American artist and curator
