= Betsy Graves Reyneau =

American painter

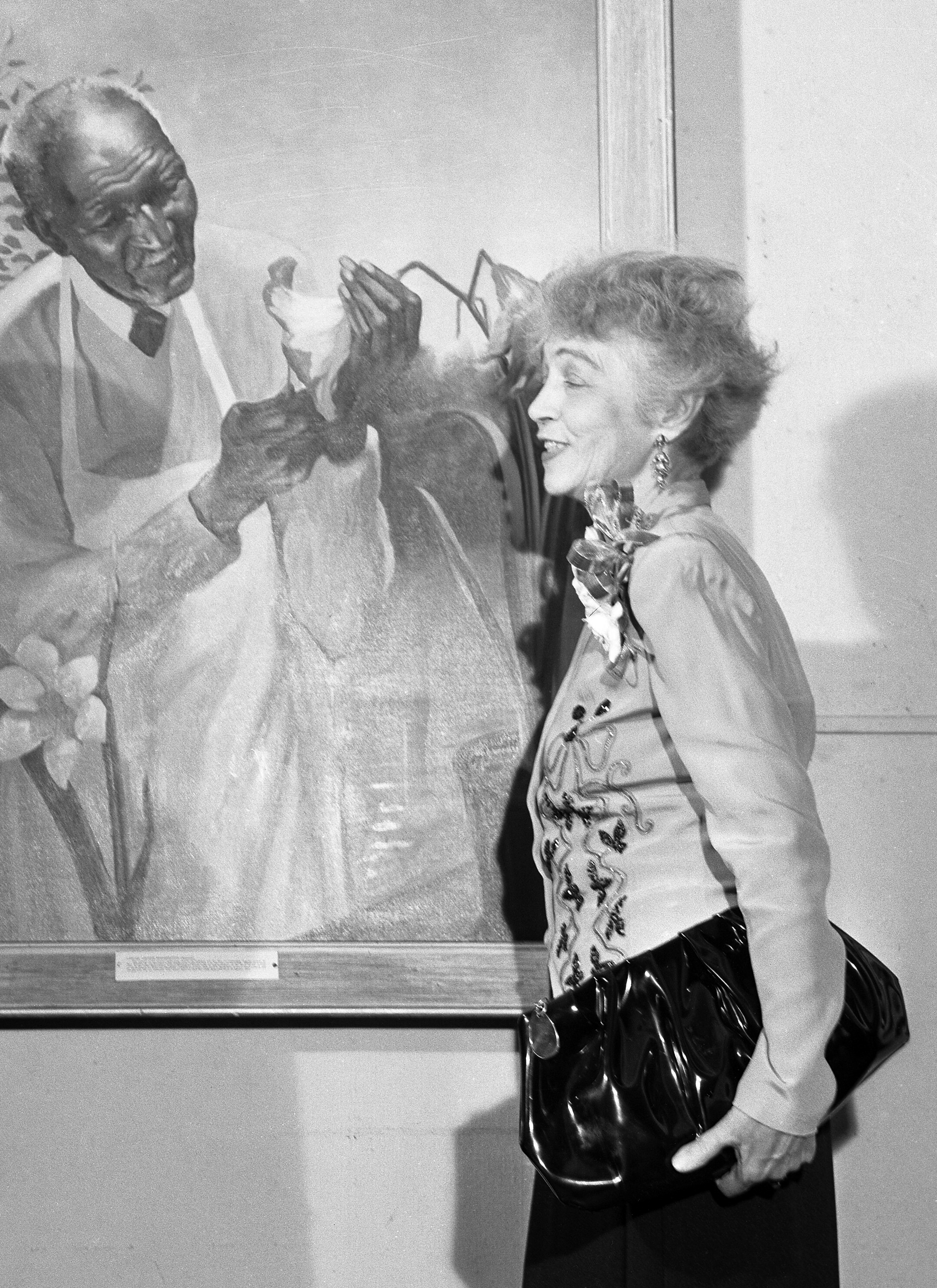
- Artist Betsy Graves Reyneau standing besides portrait of Dr. George Washington Carver, 1948
- Born: 1888; Battle Creek, Michigan
- Died: 1964 (aged 75–76); Moorestown, New Jersey
- Education: School of the Museum of Fine Arts, Boston
- Known for: Portrait painting
- Movement: Photorealism

Betsy Graves Reyneau (1888–1964) was an American painter, best known for a series of paintings of prominent African Americans for the exhibition “Portraits of Outstanding Americans of Negro Origin” that, with those by Laura Wheeler Waring and under the Harmon Foundation, toured the United States from 1944 to 1954. A granddaughter of Michigan Supreme Court Justice Benjamin F. Graves, Reyneau's sitters included Mary McLeod Bethune, George Washington Carver, Joe Louis, and Thurgood Marshall. Reyneau's portrait of Carver, the most famous, was the first of an African American to enter a national American collection.

Most of the contributions to the "Portraits of Outstanding Americans" are in the collection of the National Portrait Gallery of the Smithsonian Institution in Washington D.C.

== Early life and education ==
Betsy Graves was born in 1888 in Battle Creek, Michigan and raised in Detroit. Discouraged by her father from becoming an artist on the grounds that it was inappropriate for a woman, Graves broke ties with her family to pursue that career, and as a young woman attended the School of the Museum of Fine Arts, Boston where she studied under Fred Duvesack.

== Career ==
Reyneau was a suffragette; she became, in 1917, one of the first women to be arrested and imprisoned for protesting Woodrow Wilson's stance on women's voting rights.

She was later selected by the Circuit Court of Detroit, unbeknownst to her family who were not in touch with her at the time, to paint a portrait of her grandfather, Michigan Supreme Court Justice Benjamin F. Graves. She initialed the portrait and did not sign it with her full name as the Michigan Artists with whom she first exhibited it, would not allow the work of women. Her father, who presented the portrait, was also unaware that it was painted by his daughter

Reyneau's first solo exhibition in New York City was in 1922, on the Upper West Side, where she showed this portrait among others and received coverage in the New York Times. She also lived in Boston and Washington D.C.

Reyneau lived in Europe with her daughter from 1926 to 1939, where they took in Jews suffering persecution under the Nazis.

During the last years of World War II, she was commissioned by the U.S. Department of the Treasury to design a poster to sell war bonds. She depicted with ink on paper, Tuskegee Airman Robert W. Diez with the words Keep Us Flying!

When she returned to the United States, Reyneau was horrified by the treatment of African Americans, finding it akin to German fascism. She moved South and became active in civil rights causes. Her first portrait of a Black subject was of a young garden worker, Edward Lee, in 1942. That same year she went to the Tuskegee Institute to look for pilots to paint as subjects. Not finding any, she encountered George Washington Carver there who became her first and most famous subject. Her portrait of him in 1944 entered collection of the Smithsonian Institution, the first of a Black man in a national American collection.

=== "Portraits of Outstanding Americans of Negro Origin" ===
The Smithsonian connected Reyneau with the Harmon Foundation, which had been supporting African American art and artists for at least two decades. Reyneau and Foundation curator Mary Beede Brady headed the traveling exhibition that became “Portraits of Outstanding Americans of Negro Origin,” sponsored by the foundation, enlisting Black artist Laura Wheeler Waring, a foundation beneficiary, to do some of the portraits and to connect Reyneau to further subjects. Reyneau and Brady saw the show as a deliberately didactic way to change the views of white Americans, with Reyneau calling it a "visual education project." As the show traveled throughout the U.S. in the 1940s, including the Brooklyn Museum, Reyneau added more paintings to the collection, so that it totaled 50 by 1954 (Waring died in 1948).

Though it was an "intensely popular" exhibition, African American scholar at Harvard University Steven Nelson noted that the show's call for equality was lost on both the American press and the audience. Some journalists also assumed that Reyneau was Black. The reviewer for the Black newspaper the Pittsburgh Courier, however, wrote "Directors of museums that showed the paintings advanced the opinion that in some communities a noticeable lessening of racial tensions took place following the art display."

With the abolishing of legal segregation in Brown v. Board of Education in 1954, the Harmon Foundation ended with tour. The foundation, however, did donate most of the collection to the National Portrait Gallery of the Smithsonian Institution in 1967.

== Gallery ==
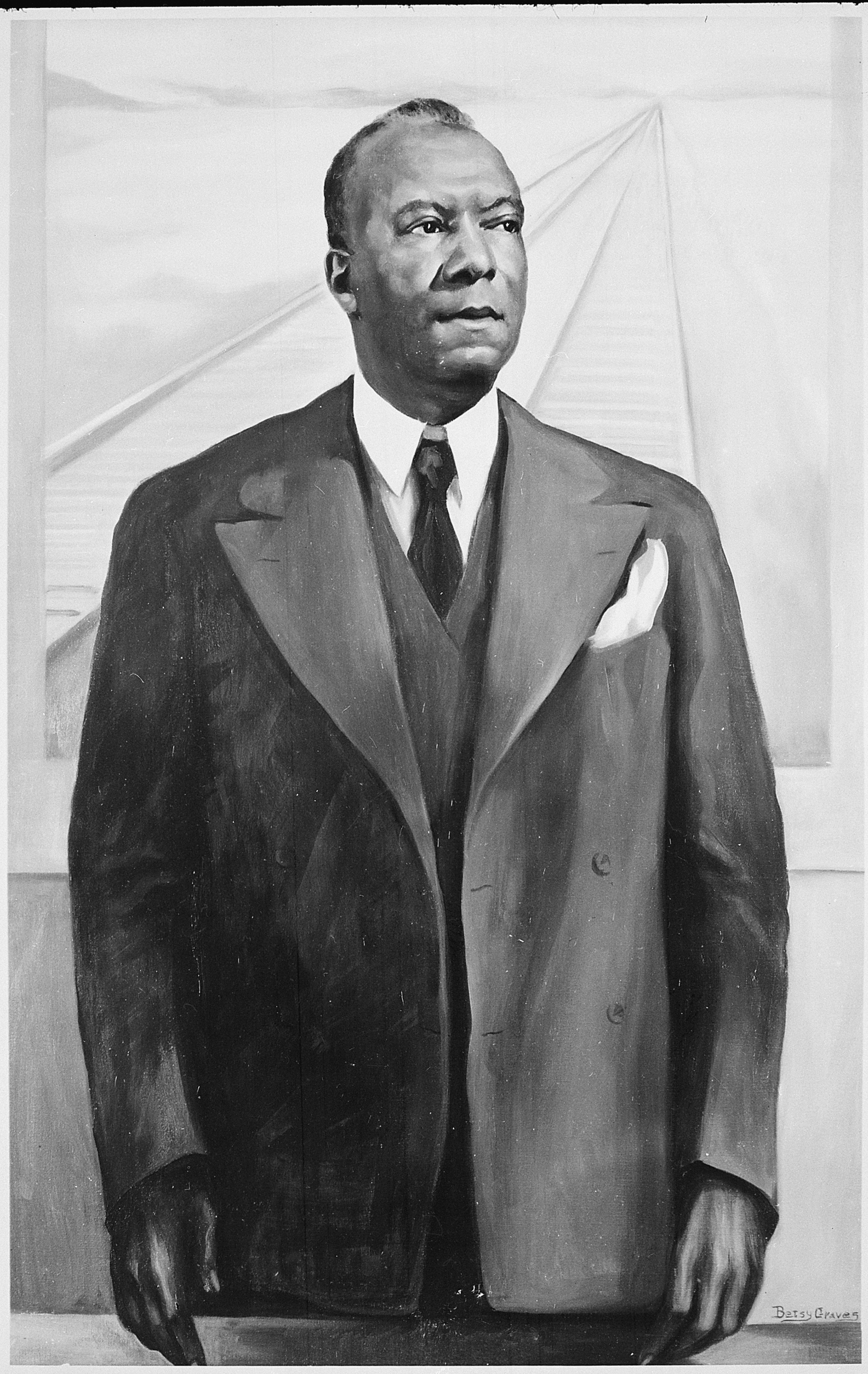
A. Philip Randolph

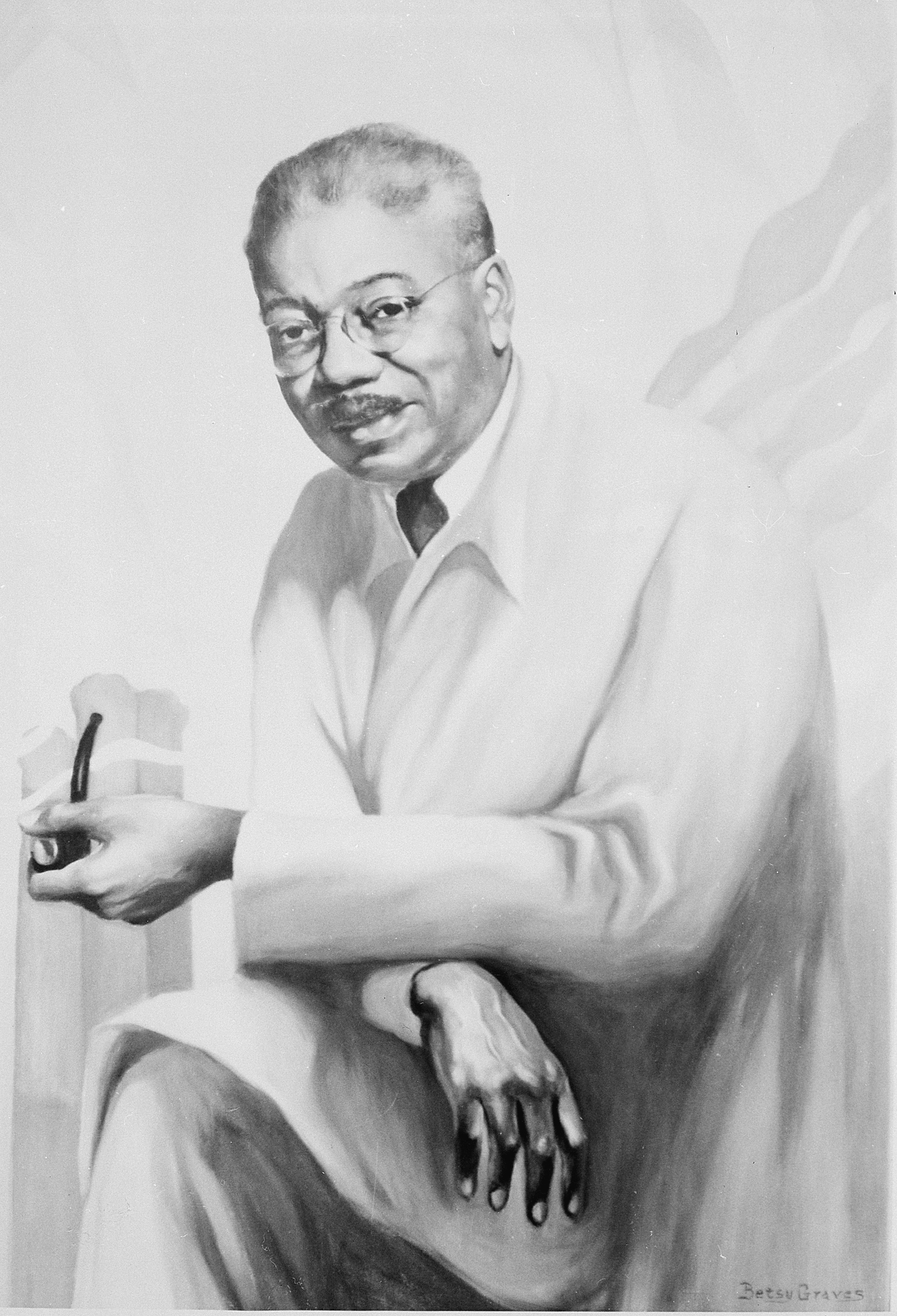
Aaron Douglas

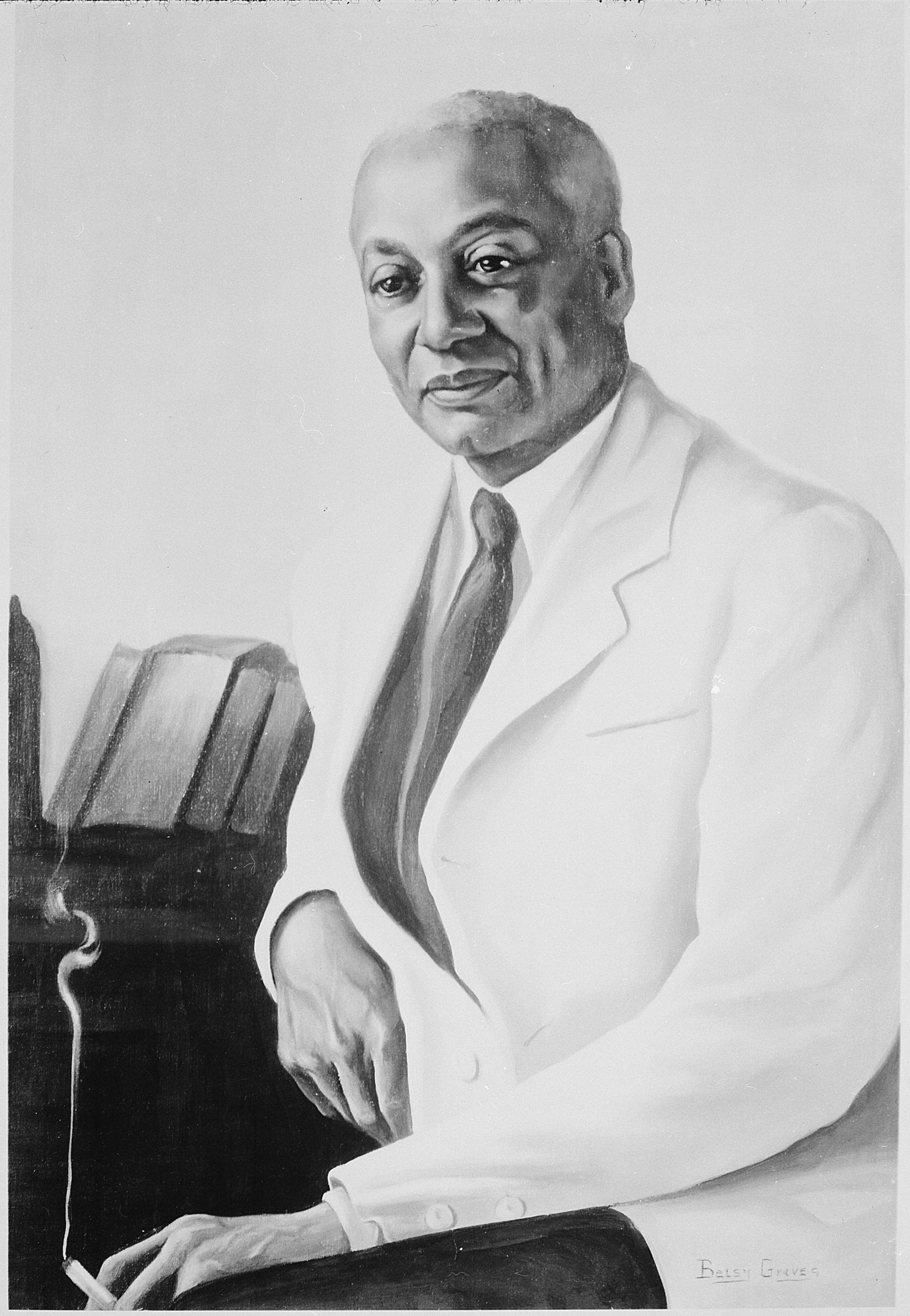
Alain Locke

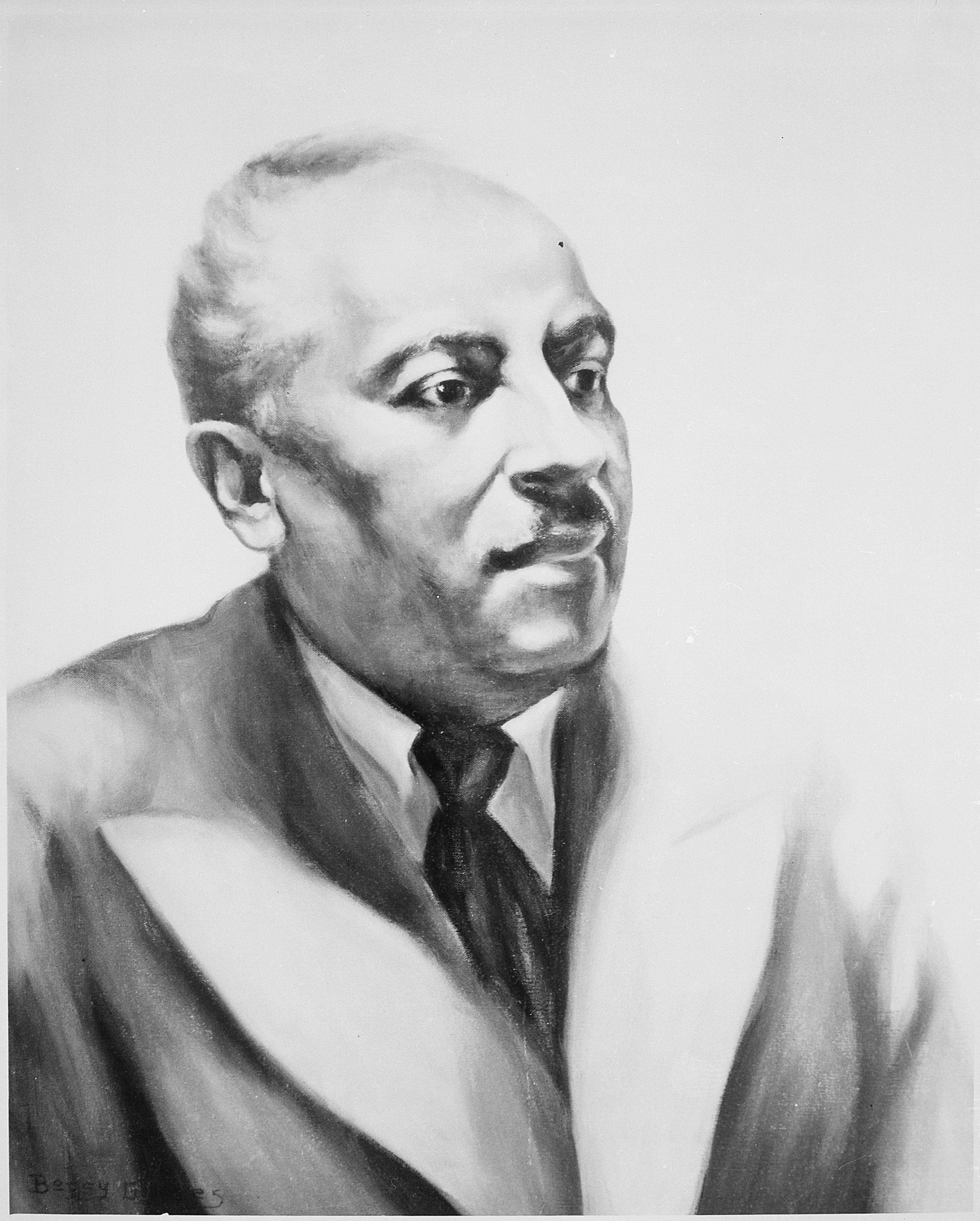
Arna Bontemps

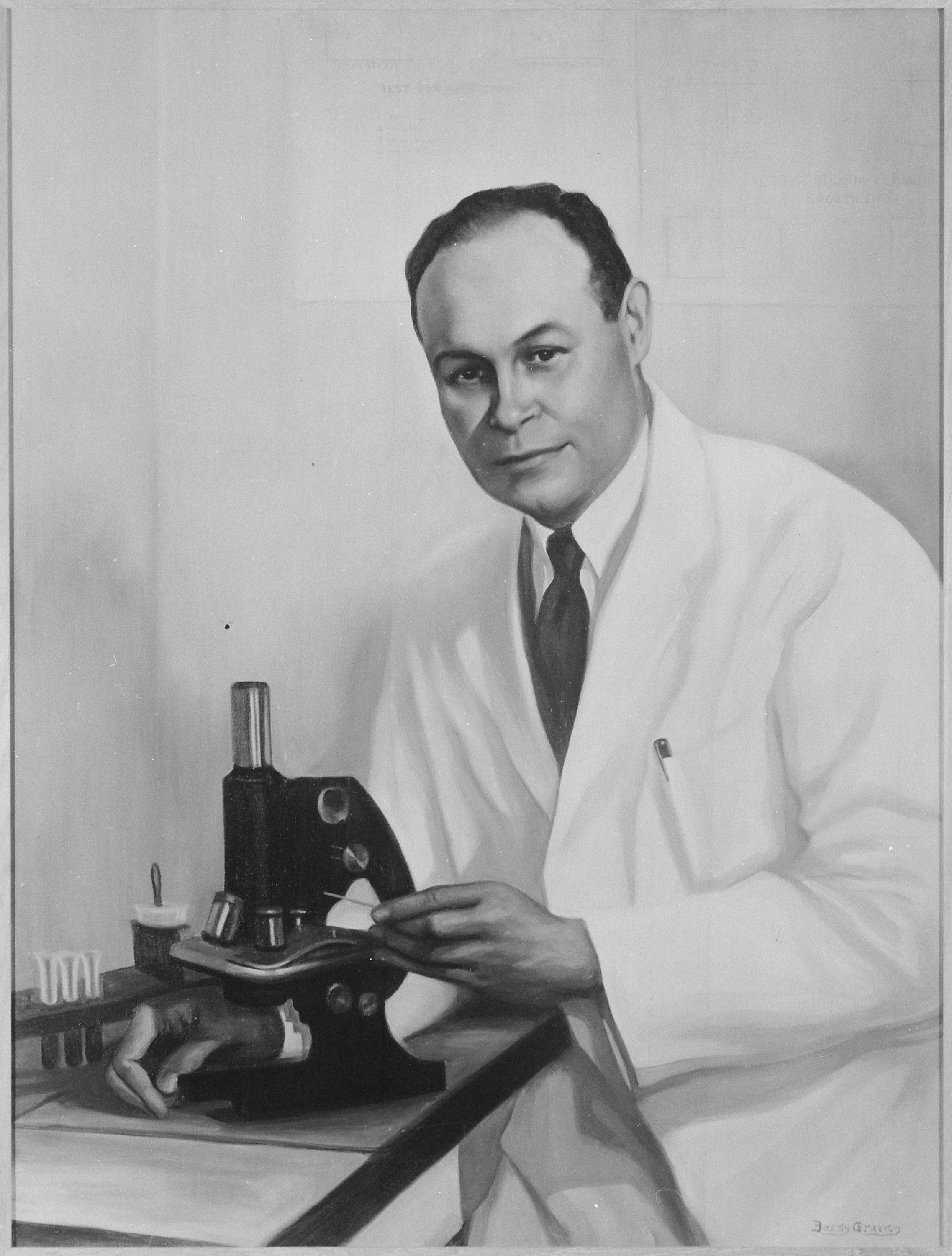
Charles Drew

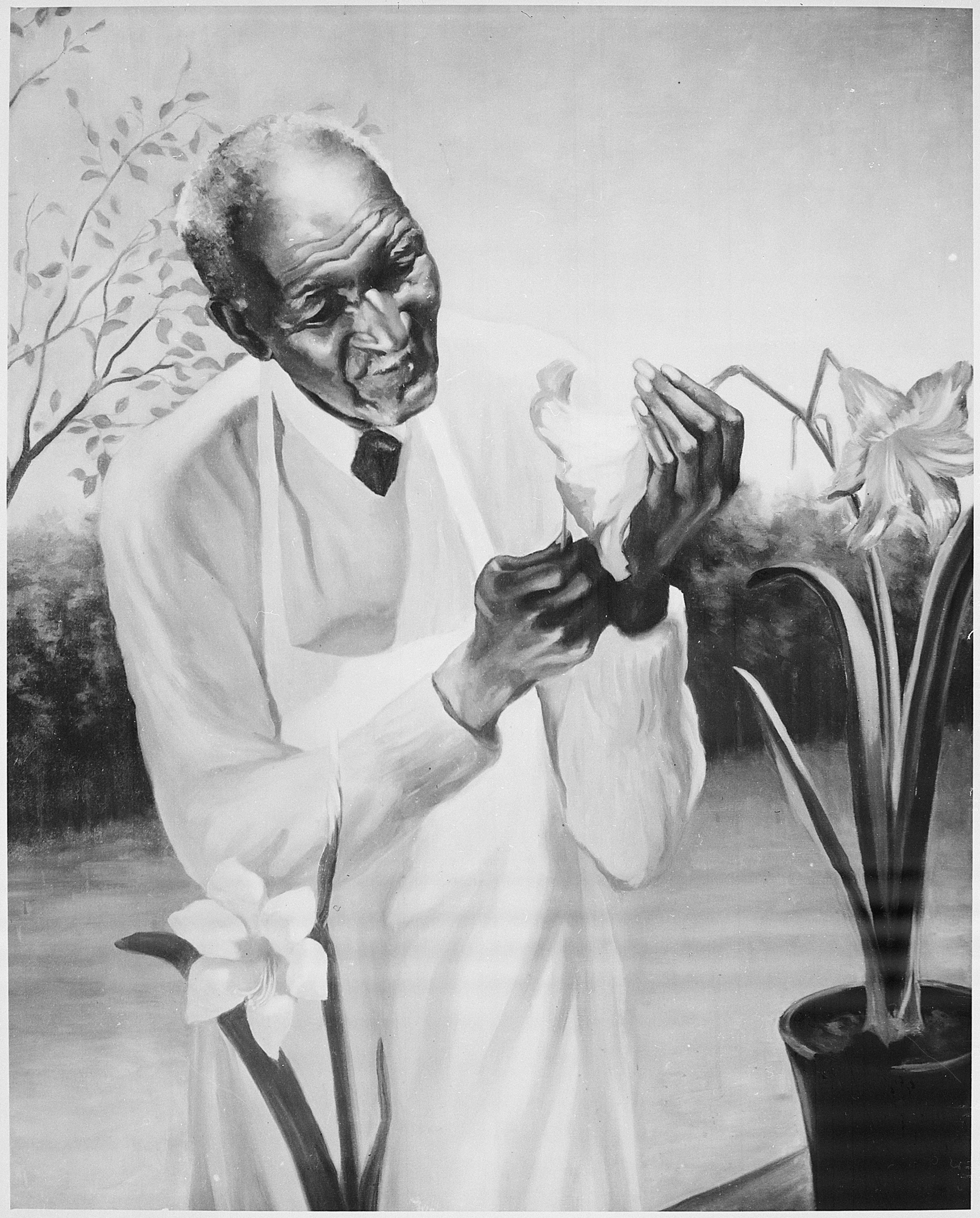
George Washington Carver

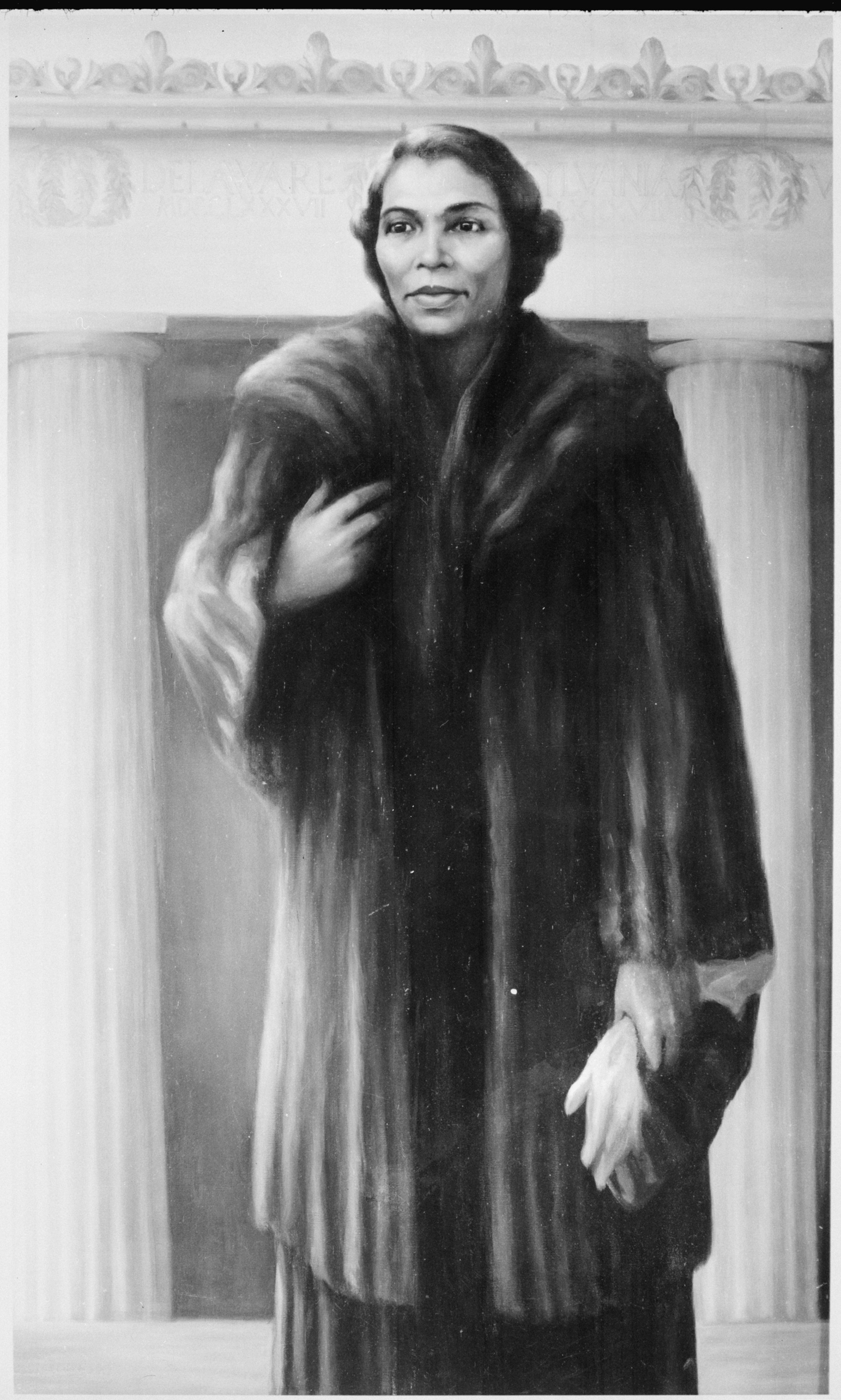
Marian Anderson

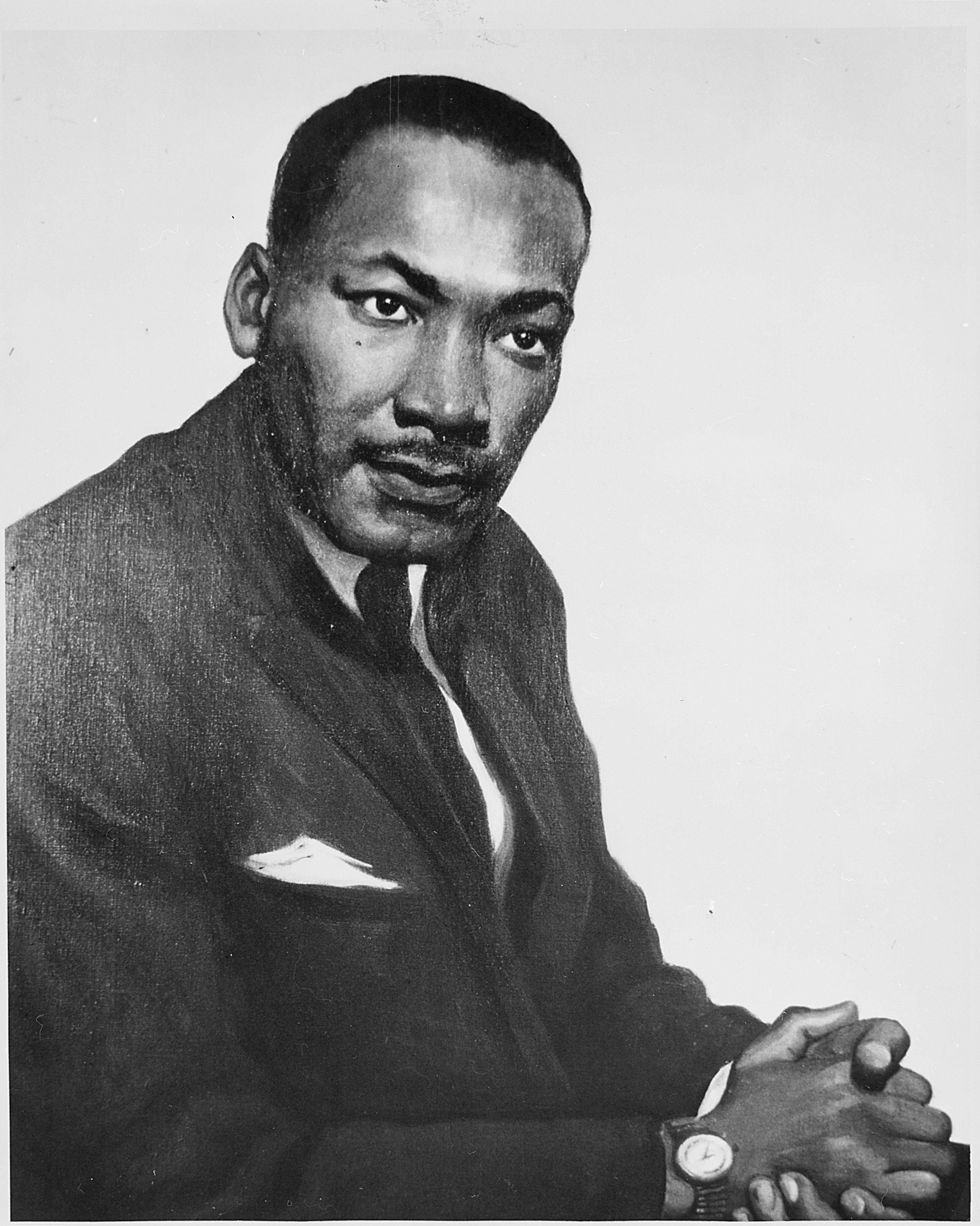
Martin Luther King Jr.

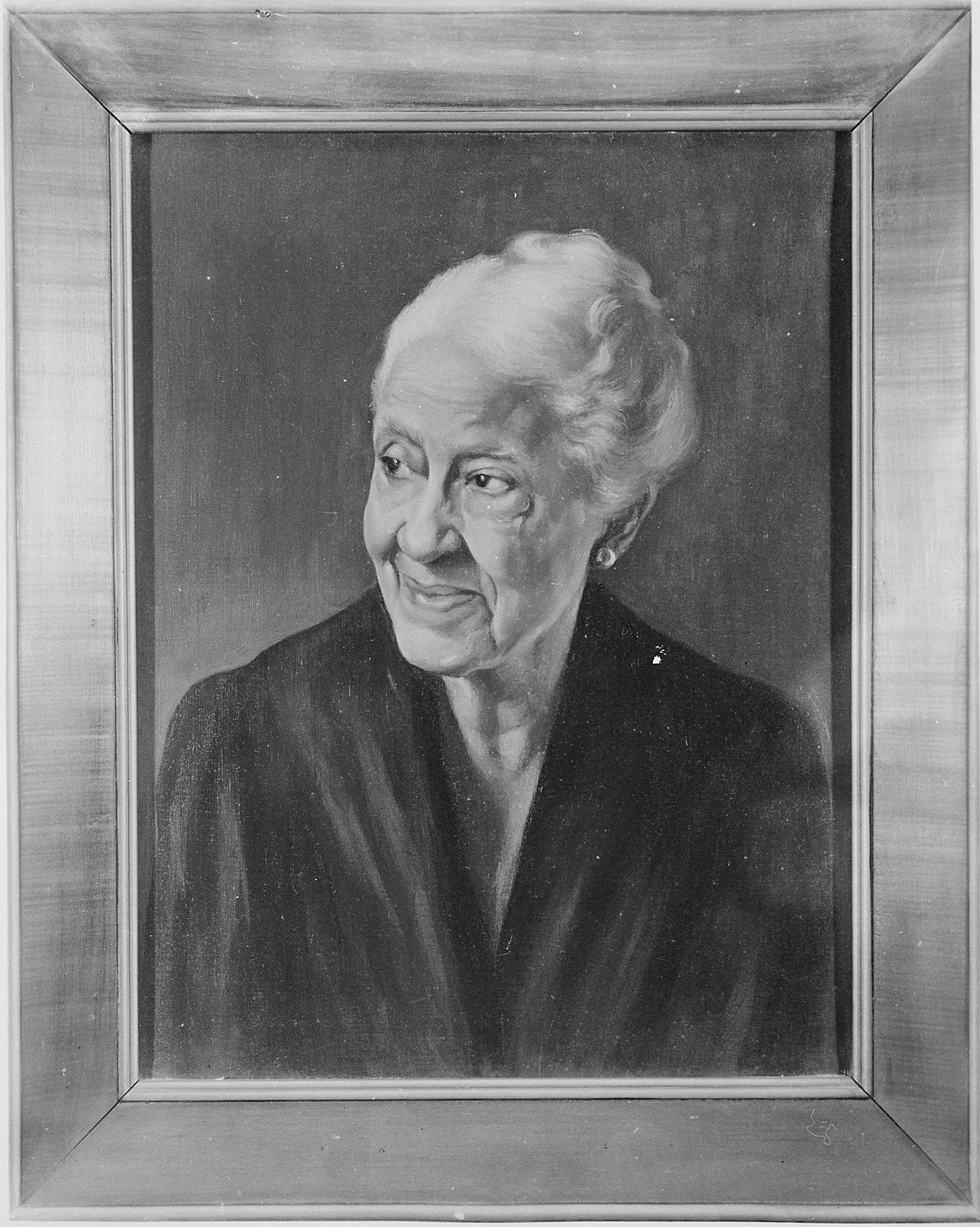
Mary Church Terrell

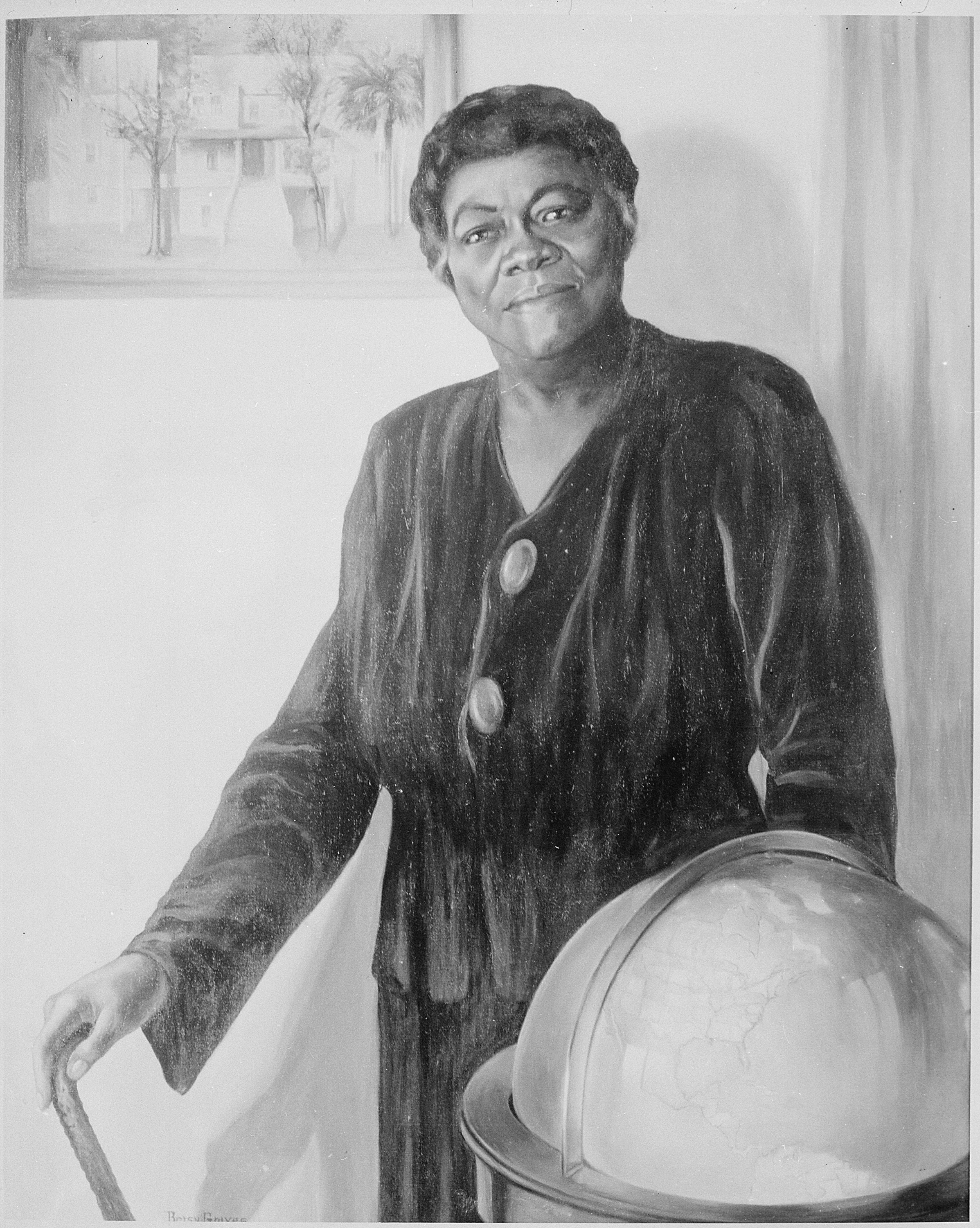
Mary McLeod Bethune

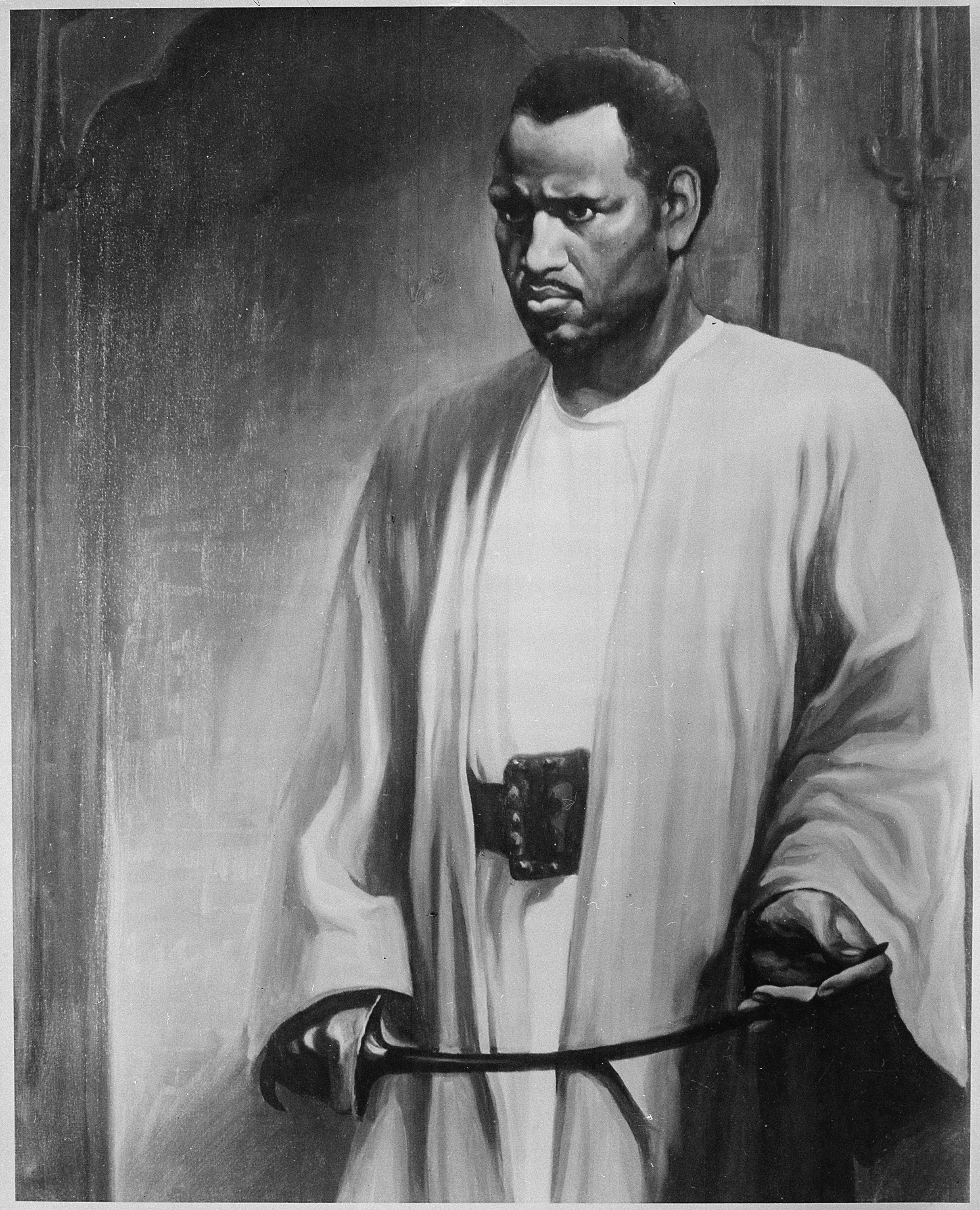
Paul Robeson

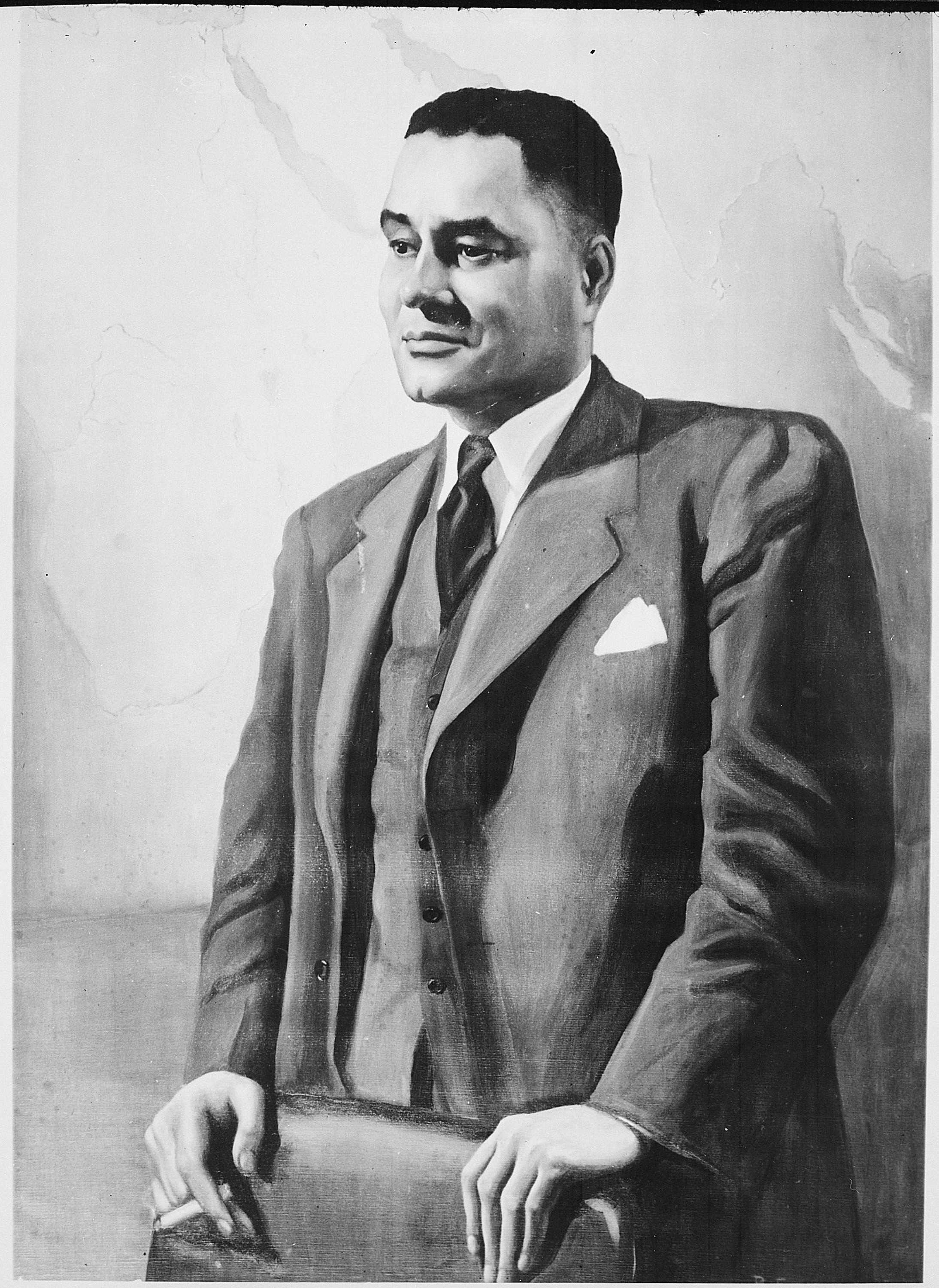
Ralph Bunche

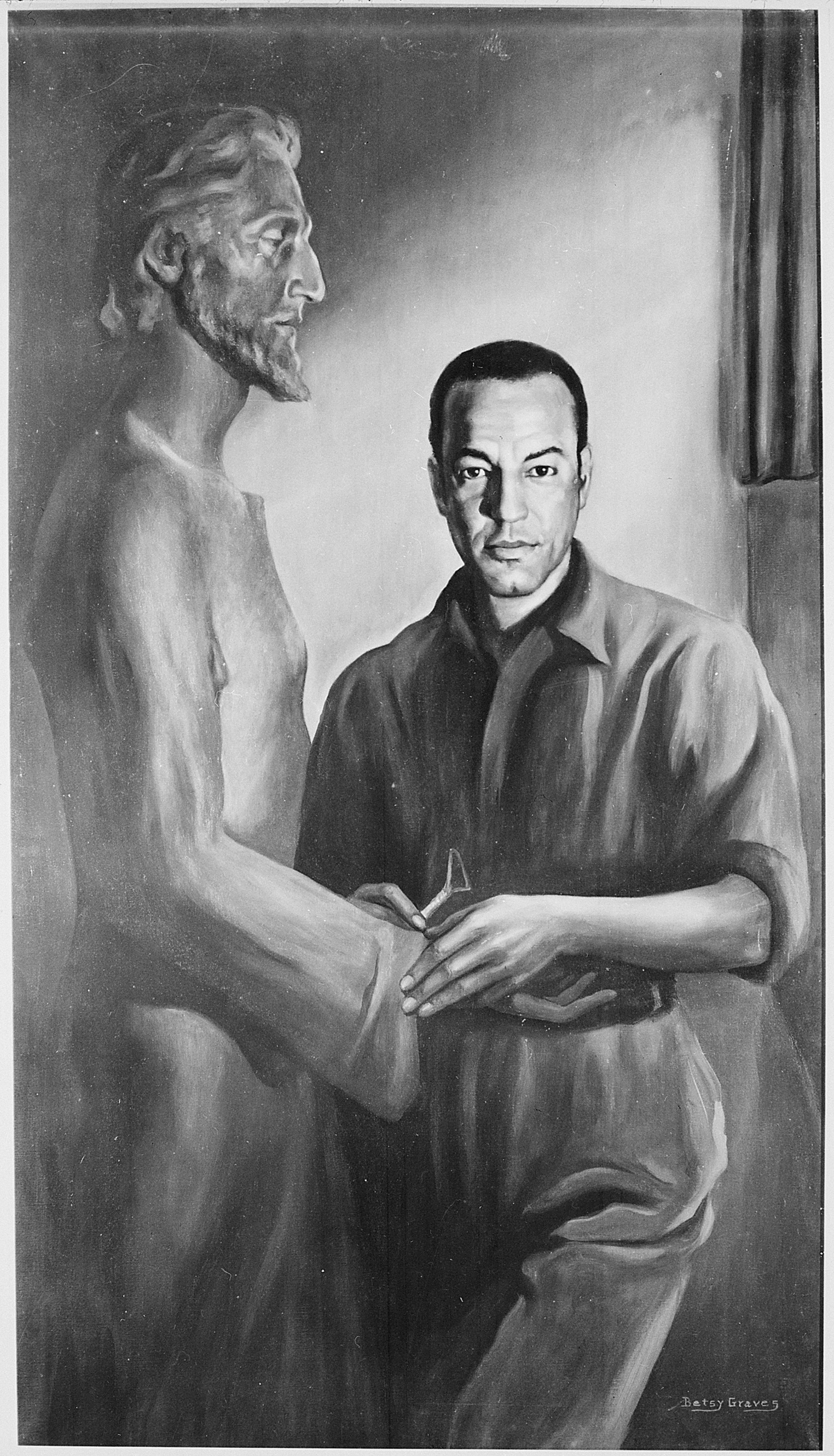
Richmond Barthé

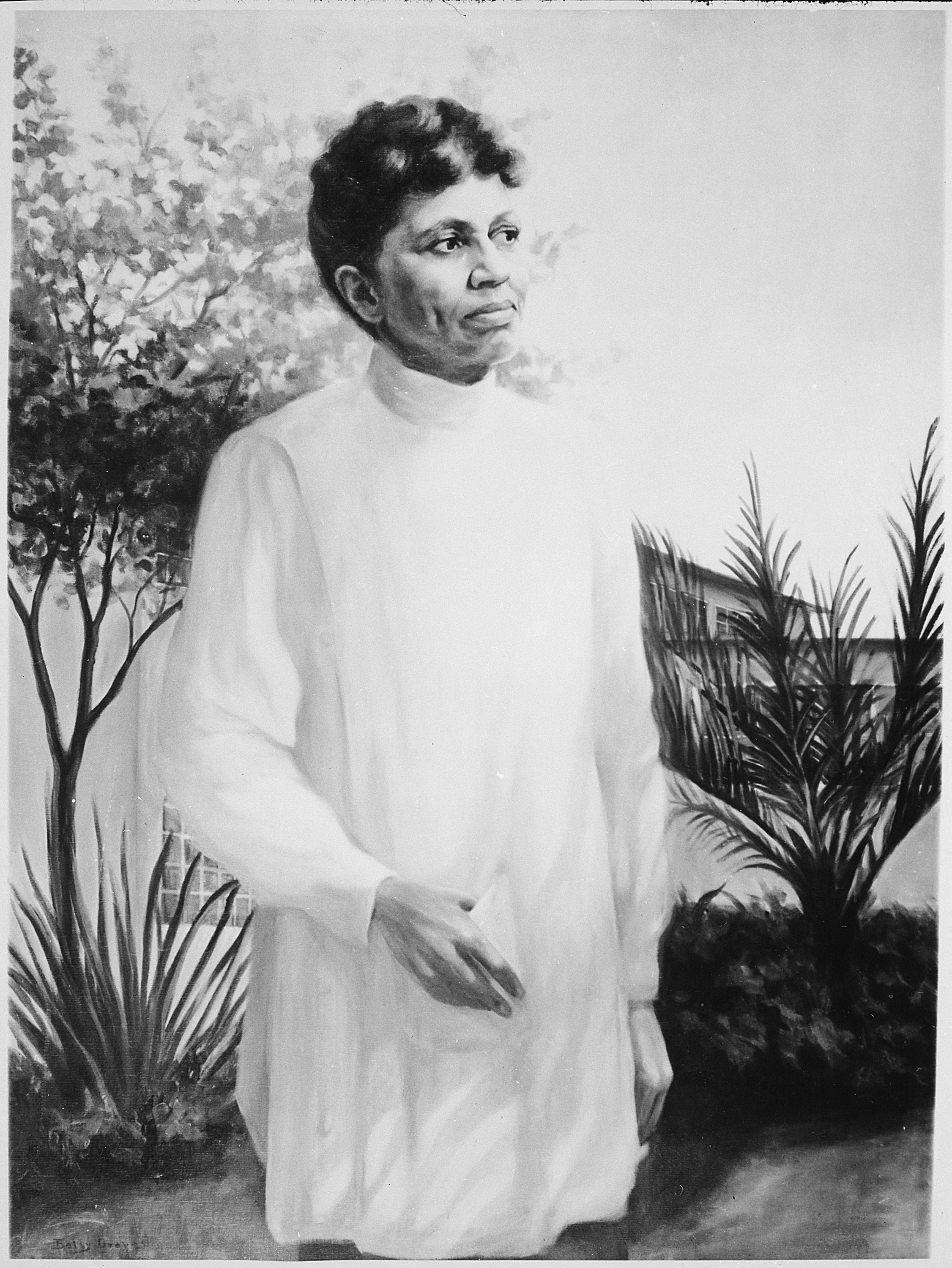
Ruth Temple

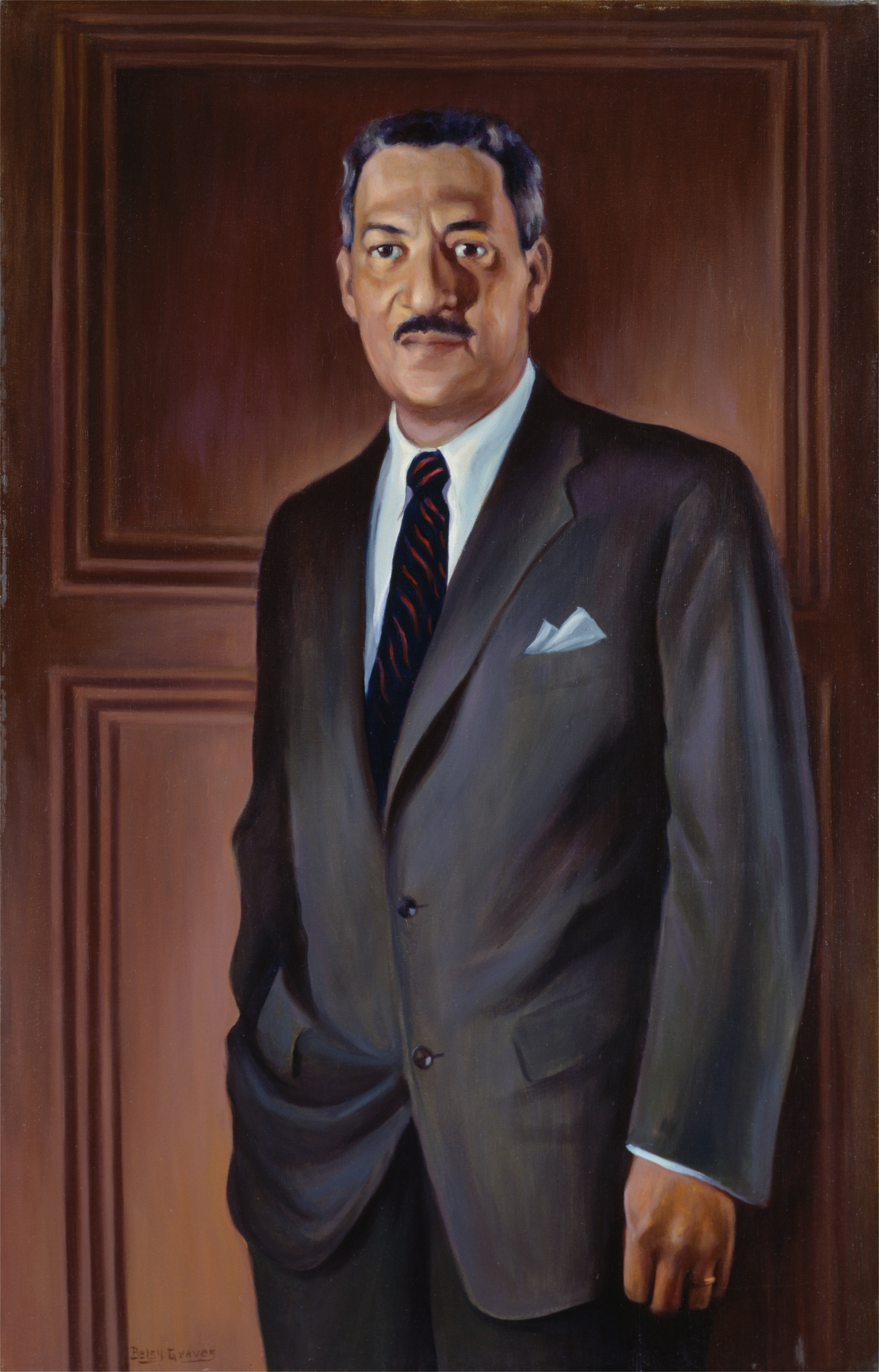
Thurgood Marshall

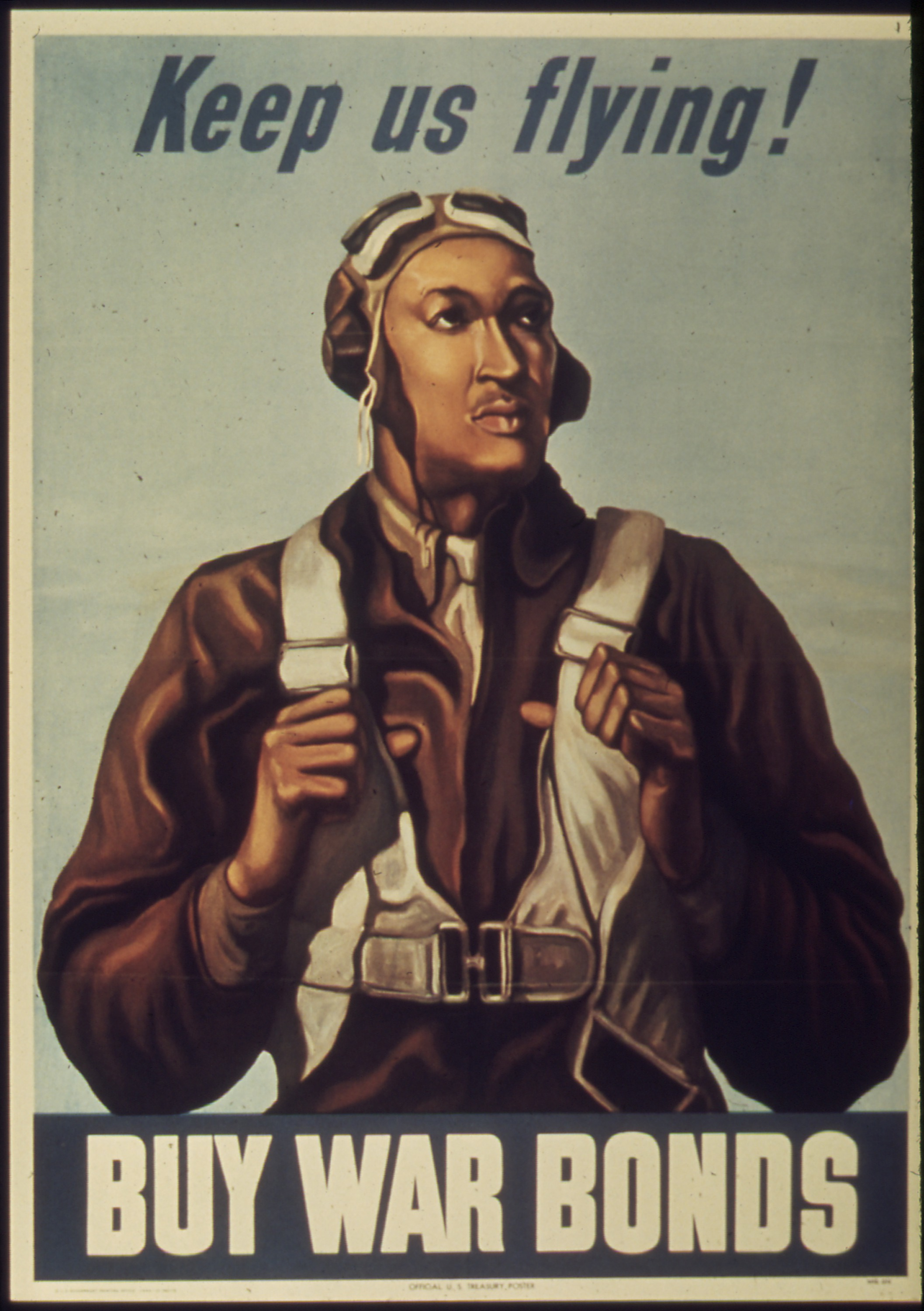
Tuskeegee Airmen "Keep us flying! Buy War Bonds" poster

=== Other Reyneau portrait subjects in the collection ===
- Hugh Mulzac
- Harry Thacker Burleigh
- William Ayers Campbell
- James Weldon Johnson
- Helen A. Whiting
- Dr. Anna Arnold Hedgeman
- May Mills
- Jane Mathilda Bolin
- Richmond Barthé

== Other collections and legacy ==
Copies of the poster Reyneau penned in 1943 advertising war bonds are at the National Archives and the Smithsonian National Museum of African American History and Culture, both in Washington, D.C. Two private portraits are also in the collection of Anthony Davenport.

Seven monochrome copies of the original color canvasses from the Harmon series that Reyneau gave to the writer Pearl S. Buck because of her involvement in civil rights were shown again in an online exhibition at the Pearl S. Buck House in Bucks County, Pennsylvania in 2020.

Reyneau was inducted into the Michigan Women's Hall of Fame in 1996.

== Personal life ==
Reyneau was married in 1915 and, a few years later, divorced. She had at least one daughter with whom she lived the last five years of her life.
