= Suzanna Ogunjami =

Nigerian-American visual artist

Suzanna Ogunjami was a visual artist of Igbo (Nigerian) ancestry. She emigrated from West Africa to Jamaica and again to New York City, where she was active from 1928–1934 and became the first African woman to have a solo exhibit in a commercial gallery in the United States. She also used the name Suzanne Ogunjami Wilson.

== Early life and education ==
Ogunjami's date of birth is unknown, and her own written accounts contrast with U.S. Census and marriage records, which state that she was born in Jamaica (Ogunjami claims Nigeria as her birthplace). At a young age, she moved to Jamaica where she finished her primary education, and then moved to New York City in 1921. She took courses in textiles and fine arts at Teachers College of Columbia University, graduated with a Bachelor of Science degree in 1928, and a Masters of Fine Arts degree in arts education in 1929.

== Work and career ==
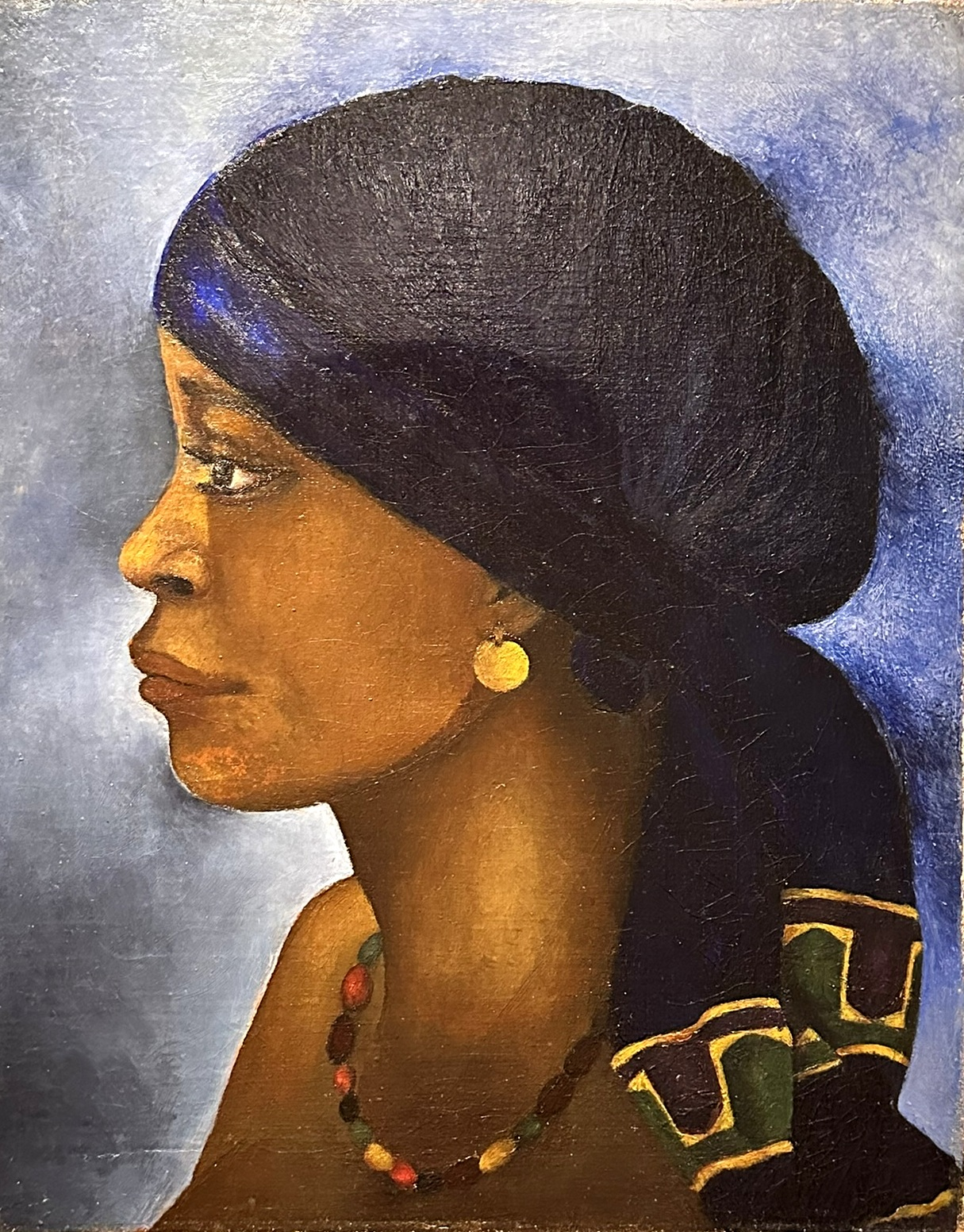
A Nupe Princess (1934)

Ogunjami expressed herself through multiple mediums, including metalwork, printmaking, and jewelry, but she is most recognized for her paintings. The subjects of her paintings include portraits of African people and African women braiding hair. Her work indicates her interests in religious education and in depictions of African peoples as sophisticated individuals, to counter stereotypes that present African peoples as uncivilized.

=== Exhibitions ===
While Ogunjami was still studying at Teachers College, one of her first oil paintings, Sunflower, was featured in the 1928 Harmon Foundation's exhibition at the International House of New York. Still Life, another of her paintings, was exhibited by the Harmon Foundation at an unknown location from 1929 to 1933. In December 1934, she had a one-woman exhibition at Delphic Studios in New York that included jewelry, metalwork, and twenty-seven paintings. Ogunjami's commentary on one of her paintings, titled Nupe Princess, at the exhibit's opening was recorded and can be found in the out-takes of A Study of Negro Artists, a 1930s film funded by the Harmon Foundation.

In March and April 1935, Ogunjami had work presented at the New Jersey State Museum, in Trenton, in the "Arts and Crafts Exhibition." In 1936, her work was included in the exhibit "Paintings and Sculpture by American Negro Artists" at the Renaissance Society in Chicago in 1936. Her work was included in the 2023 "African Modernism in America, 1947-67" exhibit at the Phillips Collection.

=== Notable works ===
- Sunflower
- Still Life
- A Nupe Princess
- Full Blown Magnolia

== Personal life ==
=== Marriage and religion ===
In 1915, Ogunjami married Matthew Wilson, an Episcopal clergyman, as indicated in a New York City marriage certificate (the 1930 U.S. Census has 1916 recorded). U.S. Census records show that Ogunjami's nephew, Francis H. Bowen, and her cousin, Lena Benford, lived with Ogunjami and her husband. She followed her husband into the Episcopalian faith after they were married, but records not do show what her religious beliefs were previously.

=== Relocation to Sierra Leone ===
To follow Wilson's wishes to return to his homeland, Sierra Leone, Ogunjami and her husband departed New York permanently for Freetown in 1935. While her husband became involved in the Anglican church there, Ogunjami kept in contact with the Harmon Foundation, telling them that her desire was to build a school, to "train our girls and boys, not only how to use their brains but their hands also, and to fit them for future useful service." She then founded the West African Normal and Industrial Institute in Freetown, as well as another school located twelve miles outside of the city.

Besides her educational efforts, Ogunjami continued to make art, specifically printmaking, and also dedicated time to religious service. She had two solo exhibitions in 1935 and 1937.

== Death ==
Ogunjami's date and place of death are unknown; correspondence ceased between her and the Harmon Foundation after 1941. One hint as to her disappearance from records and from correspondence is included in a letter, dated 1960, from Krio modern artist Miranda Burney-Nicol to Evelyn S. Brown, associate director of the Harmon Foundation, which states Burney-Nicol's belief that Ogunjami returned to Jamaica and was thought to be dead.
