= Virginia Garner =

American filmmaker (1915–2007)

Virginia Garner (1915–2007) was an American cinematographer and film producer who often collaborated with her husband, Ray Garner, on documentary and educational films worldwide. Among their most notable productions are films supported by the Harmon Foundation for the African Motion Picture Project.

== Biography & career ==
Virginia Garner, known as "Jinny", was born in Brooklyn, New York, on March 18, 1915. Virginia and Ray Garner married in 1938. She and her husband had a daughter and son.

Several of the Garners' films supported by the Harmon Foundation are available at the Library of Congress and the National Archives. Reportedly, the Garners worked with the Harmon Foundation from 1938 to 1956. African Motion Picture Project, a series of films supported by the Harmon Foundation consists of a series of films shot in Central Africa for 18 months in the late 1930s to early 1940s. According to one writer, "The missionary films produced and sponsored by the Harmon Foundation’s Religious Motion Picture Foundation were meant for a Western audience to consume. It was the hope that this consumption would generate additional support for missionary work in Africa, and by extension, support for colonization." The Garners made Africans remove the clothes they wore so that they might look more primitive and thus in line with the expectations of American audiences.

The Garners took up residence in Idyllwild, southern California, in 1966. Virginia was made Trustee Emeritus of the Board of Governors and Trustees of the Idyllwild Arts Foundation for her contributions to the organization.

== Filmography ==
- African Motion Picture Project series:
  - Children of Africa (1938)
  - Ngono and Her People (1938)
  - A Day In an African Village (1939)
  - How an African Tribe Is Ruled Under Colonial Government (1939)
  - The Story of Bamba (1939)
  - What a Missionary Does In Africa (1939)
  - The Lights Sines in Bakubaland (1939)
  - Mission Achievements in Central Africa (1939)
  - Song After Sorrow (1939), documentary that Illustrates plight of leprosy victims before and after the opening of the Bibanga Leper Camp by missionaries
  - The World's Stake in Africa (1939)
- Mesa Verde (194?), travelogue on Mesa Verde National Park, Colorado
- YWCA, Harlem, New York (1940), promotional documentary on training, sports and recreation available to African-American women in New York
- On the Farm (1940), documentary about a farm family in Michigan
- The Shining Mountains
- Hampton Institute Presents its Education for Life (1941), documentary on diversity of education for blacks at Hampton, Virginia
- Tuskegee Trains Airmen (194?), aeronautice training film featuring education and aviation training at Tuskegee Institute, Macon County, Alabama.
- Welding Techniques: Oxy-Acetylene Welding (1942), documentary on welding at Hampton Institute, Virginia
- From Every Mountainside: the Story of the Pine Mountain Settlement School (1942), documentary about the Pine Mountain Settlement School
- Creative Hands (1945), documentary on mountain handicrafts in North Carolina
- Canyon Depths (1947), documentary featuring compelling shots of Havasu Canyon, Grand Canyon National Park
- The Ramparts: A Portrait In Music (1947), documentary about a mountain range in the Canadian Rockies
- The Mountain (1947), documentary about climbing in the Grand Teton
- The Desert: Exploring the Southwest (1949), documentary about mountain and desert areas in Arizona and Utah, funded by the Harmon Foundation
- Sierra Madre to Arechuyvo (1950), documentary that accompanied lectures by filmmakers, ending with a pack mule journey into the Sierra Madre mountains of Sonora and Chihuahua, Mexico
- Be-ta-ta-kin (1955), on the archaeological ruins and surroundings of the Anasazi Indian cliff-dwelling village at the Navajo National Monument, Arizona
- The Ancient World: Greece (1955), with the support of the Harmon Foundation, the Archaeological Institute of America, and the American School at Athens
- Land of the Book (1964), documentary that brings alive the life and times of thousands of years ago in ancient Israel
- Touches of Sweet Harmony (1965), documentary about the ISOMATA Festival Orchestra's tour to Scandinavia in 1965
- Joy in the Making, (1967), documentary about the Idyllwild School of Music's summer arts program

== Resources ==
1. Images Out of Africa: The Virginia Garner Diaries of the Africa Motion Picture Project (2011)
