= Julia Davis (educator) =

Julia Davis (November 20, 1891 – April 26, 1993) was an African-American woman who for more than 60 years served as an educational force in St. Louis.

== Biography ==
Born in 1891, Davis graduated from Dumas Elementary, Sumner High and Normal Schools and Stowe Teacher College. She received an M.A. in Education from the State University of Iowa and continued graduate study at Lincoln, Boston, Northwestern, St Louis, Syracuse and New York Universities. From 1913 until her retirement in 1961, she taught in the St. Louis Public Schools. Thirty-five of those years were spent at Simmons Elementary. Among her lifelong interests, Davis pursued research in African-American history. She served actively at Central Baptist church and in national, state, and local Baptist educational programs with the Metropolitan Church Federation. She also served with other civic and cultural groups.

In 1941, Davis initiated a series of annual exhibits at the St. Louis Public Library to raise public awareness of the contributions of African-Americans to American culture. She also published many notable works on African-American history, including a calendar of African-American achievements and a compilation of biographical notes on twenty African-Americans for whom St Louis schools were named.

On November 20, 1961, the day of her retirement from teaching, she established the Julia Davis Fund at the St Louis Public Library for the purchase of books, manuscripts and other materials related to the African-American contribution to world culture. It established the Julia Davis Research Collection on African-American History and Culture, a major research collection open to the public.

She was awarded an honorary doctorate by the University of Missouri-St. Louis in 1981 and celebrated her 100th birthday in November 1991 with a ceremony at Central Library. She died on April 26, 1993.

== Julia Davis Library ==
On April 21, 1974, the St Louis Public Library broke with tradition by dedicating a Branch in honor of a living person. On February 14, 1993, the new Julia Davis Branch was officially opened. Built on a land donated by the Commerce Bank, it houses the collection consisting of books, manuscripts, newspapers, art work and other research materials, which document the history and cultural heritage of African Americans and people of African descent worldwide. Davis' initial gift of $2,500 in 1961 was used to begin the Library's Julia Davis Collection of Negro and African Literature and Culture. She also donated her personal collection to the Davis Collection at the same time.

The ground breaking for a new Julia Davis Branch at 4415 Natural Bridge was held on September 29, 1991. Land for the new Branch, the first Branch of the St. Louis Public Library system to be constructed since 1974, had been donated by Commerce Bank of St. Louis. The 15,000-square-foot (1,400 m^{2}) building, designed by architect Russell Lewis of By Design, Inc., features a 100-seat auditorium and space for collections of 50,000 volumes. Computers and educational and recreational software packages are available for public use. The Julia Davis Research Collection, now housed at Central Library, was moved to the new Branch when it opened in late 1992 or early 1993.

== Awards ==
Davis has been honored with local, national and international citations and commendations including:

- St Louis teachers with the distinguished "Apple from the Teacher" for her contributions of time and talent toward better public schools
- Distinguished service and achievement awards from local and national media and businesses
- Multiple Missouri Senate resolutions
- The President of the United States in a letter of commendation.

== Works ==
- 60th anniversary convention National Association of Negro Musicians, Inc., August 12–17, 1979 : mini-souvenir of information about Afro-American St. Louis / compiled by Julia Davis and Clara Etta Smith.
- Calendar of information series from September 1, 1966 to August 31, 1967 for Banneker district pupils.
- Harris Teachers College and Stowe Teachers College : growth and development / by Julia Davis.
- An historical review of the Prudence Crandall Club of Saint Louis, Missouri, 1915-1975 / by Julia Davis.
- The Negro in history / [compiled by Julia Davis].
- St Louis Public Schools Named for Negroes; biographical Sketches
