= Frederick Cornelius Alston =

American artist (1895–1987)

- Born: October 31, 1895; Wilmington, North Carolina, U.S.
- Died: August 1, 1987 (aged 91); Columbia, Maryland, U.S.
- Education: Pennsylvania Museum and School of Industrial Art, Shaw University
- Occupations: Painter, illustrator, educator

Frederick Cornelius Alston (1895—1987) was an American painter, illustrator, and educator. He is known for his landscapes, portraits, and paintings of urban life.

== Biography ==
Alston was born on October 31, 1895, in Wilmington, North Carolina into a Black family. He studied at the Pennsylvania School of Industrial Arts, and Shaw University.

He served in World War I from March 30, 1918 to April 19, 1919, serving overseas and rising to the rank of Sergeant.

In 1930, Alston took the position of art director at Sumner High School in St. Louis. His work is in the collection of the Tuskegee Institute, where he taught architectural rendering from 1922 to 1924.

In 1933, he participated in the "1933 Exhibition of the Work of Negro Artists" at the Art Centre in New York City, sponsored by the Harmon Foundation. Alston exhibited work in the St. Louis Citizens Art Commission, the St. Louis Society of Independent Artists, and the Urban League of St. Louis.

Alston died on August 1, 1987, in Columbia, Maryland.

His work is in the collection of the Delaware Art Museum.
