= Idyllwild Arts Academy =

Private school in Idyllwild, California

Coordinates: 33.73498°N 116.74847°W

Location
- 52500 Temecula Road; Idyllwild, California 92549; United States

Information
- Type: Private, day and boarding Specialist arts school
- Established: 1946
- President: Pamela Jordan
- Dean: Eric Bolton
- Head of school: Jason Hallowbard
- Grades: 9–12, Post-Graduate
- Gender: Coeducational
- Enrollment: 311 (2018)
- Campus size: 205 acres (83 ha)
- Campus type: Rural, San Jacinto Mountains
- Accreditation: Western Association of Schools and Colleges
- Affiliations: The Association of Boarding Schools (TABS)
- Website: www.idyllwildarts.org

Idyllwild Arts Academy is a private school located in Idyllwild, in the San Jacinto Mountains and San Bernardino National Forest, within western Riverside County, California. The school was founded in 1946. It was previously known as Idyllwild School of Music and the Arts. Joy in the Making (1967) is a documentary about its summer arts program made by filmmaker Virginia Garner, who became a Trustee Emeritus of the Board of Governors and Trustees of the Idyllwild Arts Foundation.

== Academics ==
It offers a college preparatory program for grades 9–12 and post-graduates, with training in music, theater, dance, visual art, creative writing, fashion design, film, and interdisciplinary arts. An audition or portfolio is required for admission.

It was the first independent boarding high school for the arts in the western United States.

Idyllwild Arts Academy offers programs including music, visual arts, theatre, creative writing, dance, fashion design, film & digital media, and interdisciplinary arts. Outside of the regular school year, Idyllwild Arts Academy offers summer workshops that include Jazz in the Pines, ESL, Native American Arts.

== Notable alumni ==
- Casey Abrams, American Idol season 10 contestant and musician
- Amanda Aday, actress
- Neal Bledsoe, actor on Smash and Ugly Betty
- Douwe Blumberg, sculptor
- Evan Christopher, clarinetist
- Shepard Fairey, artist
- Greer Grammer, actress
- Nora Germain, violinist
- Trevor Hall, musician
- Celeste Headlee, author and radio host
- Marin Ireland, actress
- Aaron Lee Tasjan, musician
- Nate Lowman, artist
- Orpheo McCord, musician, Edward Sharpe and the Magnetic Zeros
- Jennifer Missoni, actress
- Michael Tilson Thomas, conductor and pianist
- Liang Wang, oboeist
- Mara Wilson, actress

== Notable faculty ==
- Lisa Adams, painter
- Suzanne Jackson, visual artist and dancer
- Michael Kabotie, Hopi silversmith
- Bella Lewitzky, Modern dancer and founding chair of the Dance Department at Idyllwild Arts Academy (1956–1972).
- Mary Stone McLendon, Chickasaw artist and educator.
- Eleonore Schoenfeld, cellist and longtime professor at University of Southern California (USC) at the Thornton School of Music.

== In popular culture ==
In the television series The Fosters the character Brandon Foster attends a summer program in piano competition at Idyllwild.

Author Justin Cronin confirmed on Twitter that Idyllwild Arts Academy eventually becomes the community called First Colony in his book The Passage as humanity tries to survive one hundred years into a vampire apocalypse.
