= William E. Harmon Foundation =

American philanthropic foundation

The Harmon Foundation, established in 1921 by white real-estate developer William E. Harmon (1862–1928), is best known for funding and collecting the work of African-American artists.

== History ==
The Harmon Foundation was established as "a medium through which constructive and inspirational service for others may be rendered." William Harmon, who had for years been making secret philanthropic donations in the guise of his alter ego, "Jedediah Tingle", began his foundation's work with a test of the efficacy of loans vs. scholarships in college education, and outright grants to local municipalities for the purpose of establishing permanent playgrounds. After 1947, the William E. Harmon Foundation expanded its work in the arts to include African and Afro-diasporic artists. The foundation was among the first organizations in the United States to promote contemporary African-American and African art, sponsoring travel to Africa to study, exhibit their work and meet other artists. Mary B. Brady the director of the foundation from 1922 until 1967.

It offered awards for distinguished achievements in eight different fields: literature, music, fine arts, business and industry (such as banker Anthony Overton in 1927), science and innovation, education (for example, educator Janie Porter Barrett in 1929), religious service, and race relations. It also sponsored traveling art exhibitions. Beyond offering support directly to outstanding individuals in the Black community, its educational outreach included films and books.

The foundation faced several controversies during its operation, including: criticism over its perpetuation of racial segregation and paternalism through all-black exhibitions and mostly-white or all-white juries, with notable condemnation by artist Romare Bearden; unsubstantiated allegations made by several black artists and scholars that it received funding from the State Department as part of the agency's anti-Communist cultural programs during the Cold War; and public disputes over director Mary Brady's decision to remove portraits of W. E. B. Du Bois and Paul Robeson from an exhibition. Robeson's portrait was removed due to his support of the Communist Party, and the foundation claimed that Du Bois's portrait was removed due to space considerations, but many African Americans viewed both removals as politically motivated.

== Supported films ==
The Harmon Foundation supported a number of films, many of which are in the Library of Congress and the National Archives. Notable films include:

- The Negro and Art (1933)
- We Are All Artists (1936)
- African Film Project, consisting of a series of films shot in Central Africa in the late 1930s to early 1940s, directed by the husband and wife team of Ray and Virginia Garner. The Garners made Africans remove the clothes they wore so that they might look more primitive and thus in line with the expectations of American audiences.

== Awards (1926—1933) ==
The William E. Harmon Foundation Award for Distinguished Achievement Among Negroes was created in 1926. It was offered for distinguished achievement in many different fields among Negroes or in the cause of race relations.

The award recognized achievements in eight fields:

- business and industry (such as banker Anthony Overton in 1927)
- education (for example, educator Janie Porter Barrett in 1929)
- fine arts
- literature
- music
- race relations
- religious service
- science and innovation

In seeking to reward excellence and increase prestige, the Foundation did not grant awards in every field at every presentation. Awards were most regularly granted in the arts, in part to meet the pent up energies of a generation of African American intellectuals and artists. Indeed, "submissions in the fine arts category was the chief venue open to African American artists", at least during the first decade of the Foundation's existence.

This helped art education programs grow in many areas. Among the many recipients of the awards were Hale Woodruff, Palmer Hayden, Archibald Motley (his winning piece was The Octoroon Girl), Countee Cullen and Langston Hughes.

== Exhibitions (1927—1967) ==
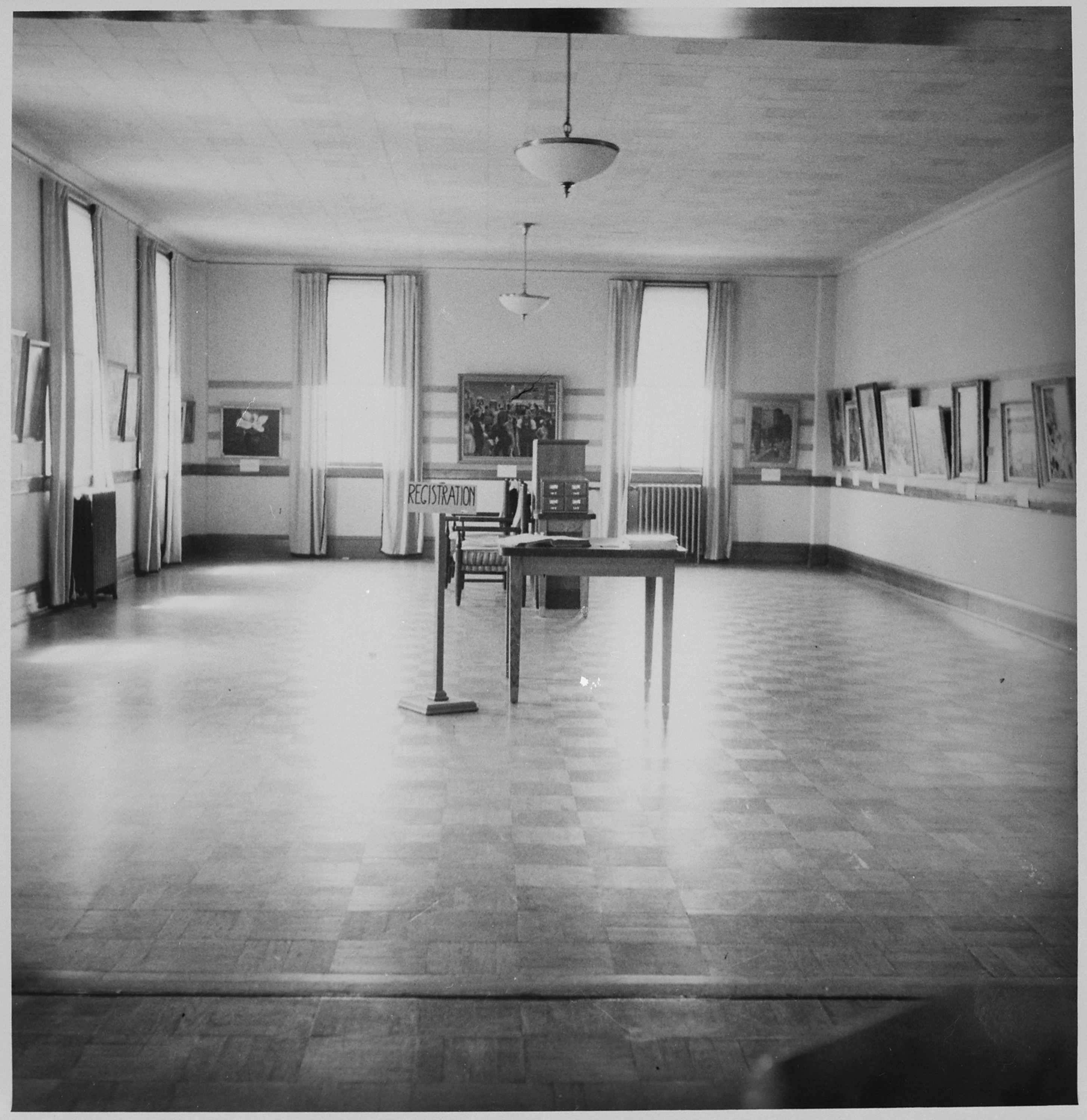
Dillard University, Harmon Foundation Exhibit, c1936-7

In the early 20th century, African Americans struggled to find public exhibition space. "Prior to the end of World War I, State Fairs and other such expositions were practically the only spaces Black artists had to display their art." The Foundation's annual Exhibition of the Work of Negro Artists, conceived by Mary Brady, was held in 1927 through 1931, 1933, and 1935. This series offered Black artists the first serious venue for exhibition available exclusively for their work on a something-approaching national basis. The exhibitions in 1927, 1928, and 1929 were held at International House, a residential and program center for international graduate students whose values and mission were held to be aligned with the Harmon's.

Key elements of the Harmon art exhibitions were offers of "substantial prizes" together with gold, bronze medals, and, perhaps more importantly, the Harmon Foundation arranged for these exhibitions to travel, opening spaces for the artwork where it would have been challenging for individual artists to gain exposure.

Laura Wheeler Waring was one of the artists featured the first year of the exhibitions, and the Foundation commissioned her to do portraits of prominent African Americans.

=== 1933 Exhibition of the Work of Negro Artists, Art Centre, New York ===
Date	Participating	New Participants	Prizes	Sponsor	Recipient	Work(s)
1933	57	29	Most Outstanding Work $100	Mrs, Alexander (Ogden) Purves	Sargent Claude Johnson	Pearl
1933	57	29	Subject Matter $100	Mrs. John D. Rockefeller, Jr.	Palmer Hayden	Fétiche et Fleurs
1933	57	29	John Hope Prize in Sculpture $100		William Ellisworth Artis	Head of a Girl
1933	57	29	Arthur A. Schomburg Portrait Prize $100		James A. Porter	Woman with a Jug

Other artists participating in the "1933 Exhibition of the Work of Negro Artists" included artists, James Lesesne Wells (bronze medal for most representative work in black and white), Charles Henry Anderson, Frederick Cornelius Alston, Pastor Argudin y Pedroso, William Artis, George Edward Bailey, Mike Bannarn, Richmond Barthé, Humphreys William Becket, James Bland, Samuel Ellis Blount, David P. Boyd, Cloyd L. Boykin, Edward J. Brandford, William E. Braxton, Daisy Brooks, Mabel Brooks, Samuel Joseph Worthington Brown, Eugene Burkes, William A. Cooper, Samuel A. Countee, Allan Crite, Charles C. Dawson, Beauford Delaney, Arthur Diggs, Frank J. Dillon, Lilian Dorsey, Aaron Douglas, Robert S. Duncanson, Ferdinand W. Ellington, William McKnight Farrow, Elton Fax, Allan Randall Freelon, Meta Vaux Warrick Fuller, Otis Galbreath, William Goss, William E. Grant, Ruth Gray, Constance Willard Grayson, John Hailstalk, John W. Hardrick, Edwin Harleston, John Taylor Harris, Anzola D. Laird Hegomin, James V. Herring, Clifton Hill, Jesse Mae Housley, May Howard Jackson, J. Antonio Jarvis, Cornelius W. Johnson, George H. Benjamin Johnson, Gertrude Johnson, Gladys L. Johnson, Malvin Gray Johnson, Sargent Johnson, William H. Johnson, Archie Jones, Henry Bozeman Jones, Vivian Schuyler Key, Benjamin Kitchin, Richard W. Lindsey, Romeyn Van Vleck Lippmann, Howard H. Mackey, Harold E. Marshall, Effie Mason, Helen Mason, Samuel E. MacAlpine, Edward T. McDowell, Susie McIver, C.G. McKenzie, Elenor McLaren, Archibald Motley, Richard Bruce Nugent, Allison Oglesby, Maude Owens, Suzanne Ogunjami Wilson, Kenneth R. O'Neal, Elenor E. Paul, John Phillipis, Philip Leo Pierre, Robert Pious, Celestine Gustava Johnson Pope, James Porter, Elizabeth Prophet, Oliver Reid, Teodoro Ramos Blanco y Penita, Charles A. Robinson, Augusta Savage, William Edouard Scott, Albert A. Smith, Walter W. Smith, Charles Spears Jr., Teressa Simpson Staats, Jesse Stubbs, Mary Lee Tate, Ulysses S. Grant Tayes, Daniel Tillman, John E. Toodles, Laura Wheeler Waring, James Lesesne Wells, Simeon Sir Henry Williams, Ellis Wilson, Arthur Glenn Winslow, and Hale Woodruff.

=== Joint exhibitions ===
- Conrad Kickert (1933), sponsored jointly by the National Alliance of Art and Industry

== Disestablishment ==
The Harmon Foundation closed in 1967. Its substantial collection of art was dispersed among numerous institutions, including several Smithsonian museums in Washington, D.C., although the majority of the art collection was given to two HBCUs: Fisk University in Nashville, Tennessee, and Hampton University in Hampton, Virginia.

== See also ==
=== Sites ===
- William E. Harmon Foundation award for distinguished achievement among Negroes
- David C. Driskell (worked closely Mary B. Brady to show works from the Harmon Collection in exhibitions)

=== Productions, archived materials ===
- Negro Schools in American Education Series: Xavier University: America's Only Catholic College for Negro Youth (Documentary)
- The National Archives Catalogue: Harmon Foundation Collection (1922-1967)
