= Sargent Claude Johnson =

American painter

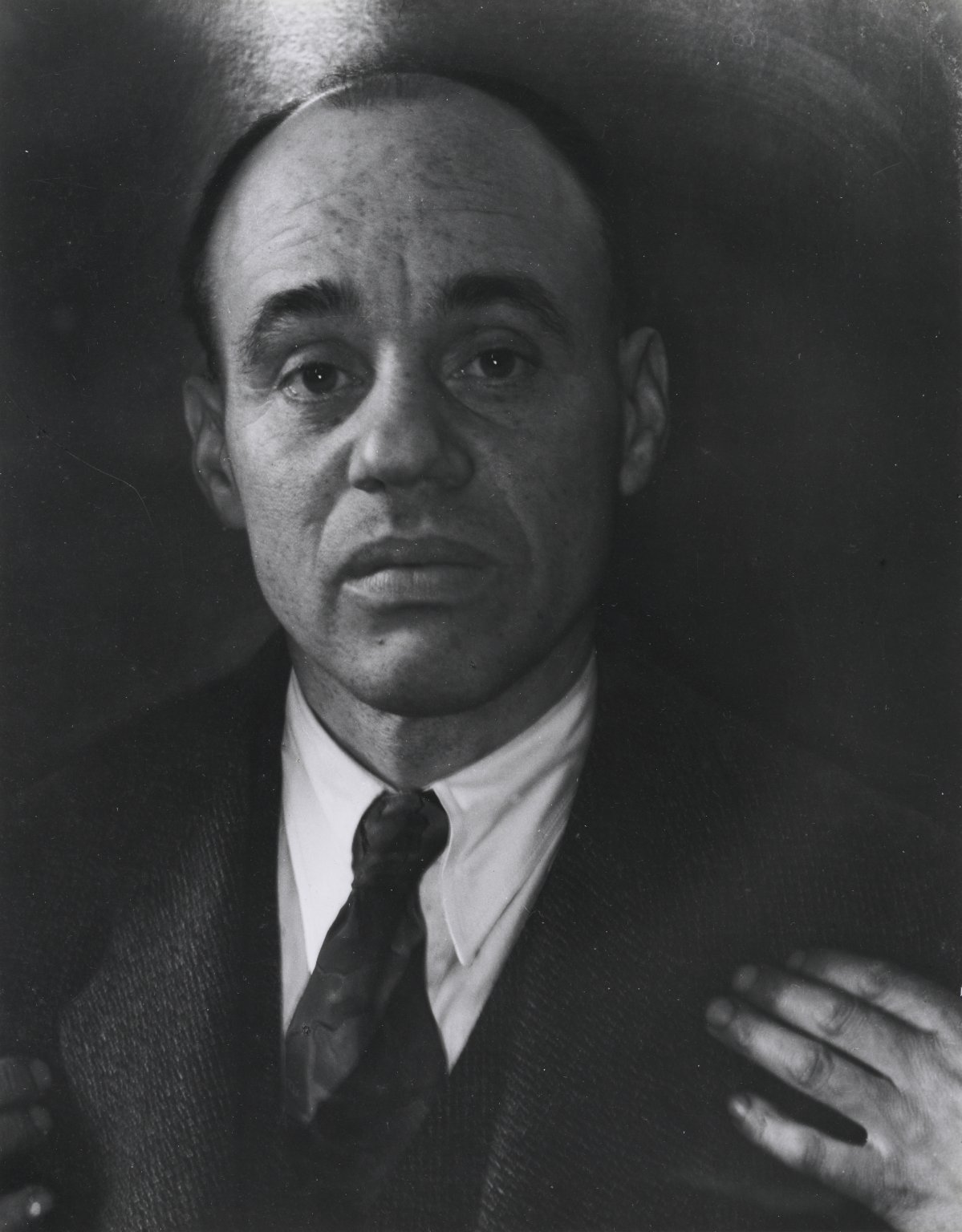
- Consuelo Kanaga, Sargent Johnson, 1934
- Born: Sargent Claude Johnson; November 7, 1888; Boston, Massachusetts
- Died: October 10, 1967 (aged 78); San Francisco, California
- Known for: Painting, sculpture, ceramics
- Notable work: Forever Free (1933)
- Movement: Harlem Renaissance

Sargent Claude Johnson (November 7, 1888 – October 10, 1967) was one of the first African-American artists working in California to achieve a national reputation. He was known for Abstract Figurative and Early Modern styles. He was a painter, potter, ceramicist, printmaker, graphic artist, sculptor, and carver. He worked in a variety of media, including ceramics, clay, stone, wood, terra cotta, tiled murals, watercolor, oil on canvas, porcelain enamel on steel, and lithography. Despite having lived in San Francisco for most of his adult life, Johnson is considered one of the stellar artists of the Harlem Renaissance.

== Early life and education ==
Sargent Johnson was the third of six children, born to a father of Swedish descent and his mother of African-American and Cherokee ancestry. His father died in 1897, and his mother died of tuberculosis in 1902. Sargent, at fifteen, along with his siblings, went to live with their uncle, Sherman Jackson Williams, and his wife, May Howard Jackson, in Washington, D.C. May was a pioneer African-American sculptor specializing in portrait busts with Negro themes, and she undoubtedly influenced Sargent Johnson at an early age. Later, the boys of the family were sent to an orphanage in Worcester, Massachusetts, and the girls to a Catholic school for African-American and Native-American girls in Pennsylvania. As adults, some of Sargent's siblings chose to identify as either Native Americans or Caucasians. Sargent identified as African American.

In 1915, Sargent Johnson moved to the San Francisco Bay area. The Panama-Pacific International Exposition, which had a stimulating influence on California art, took place shortly after his arrival. The same year, Sargent Johnson married Pearl Lawson and began studying drawing and painting at the A. W. Best School of Art. From 1919 to 1923, Sargent attended the California School of Fine Arts (now the San Francisco Art Institute), where his teachers included the sculptors Beniamino Bufano and Ralph Stackpole.

== Career ==
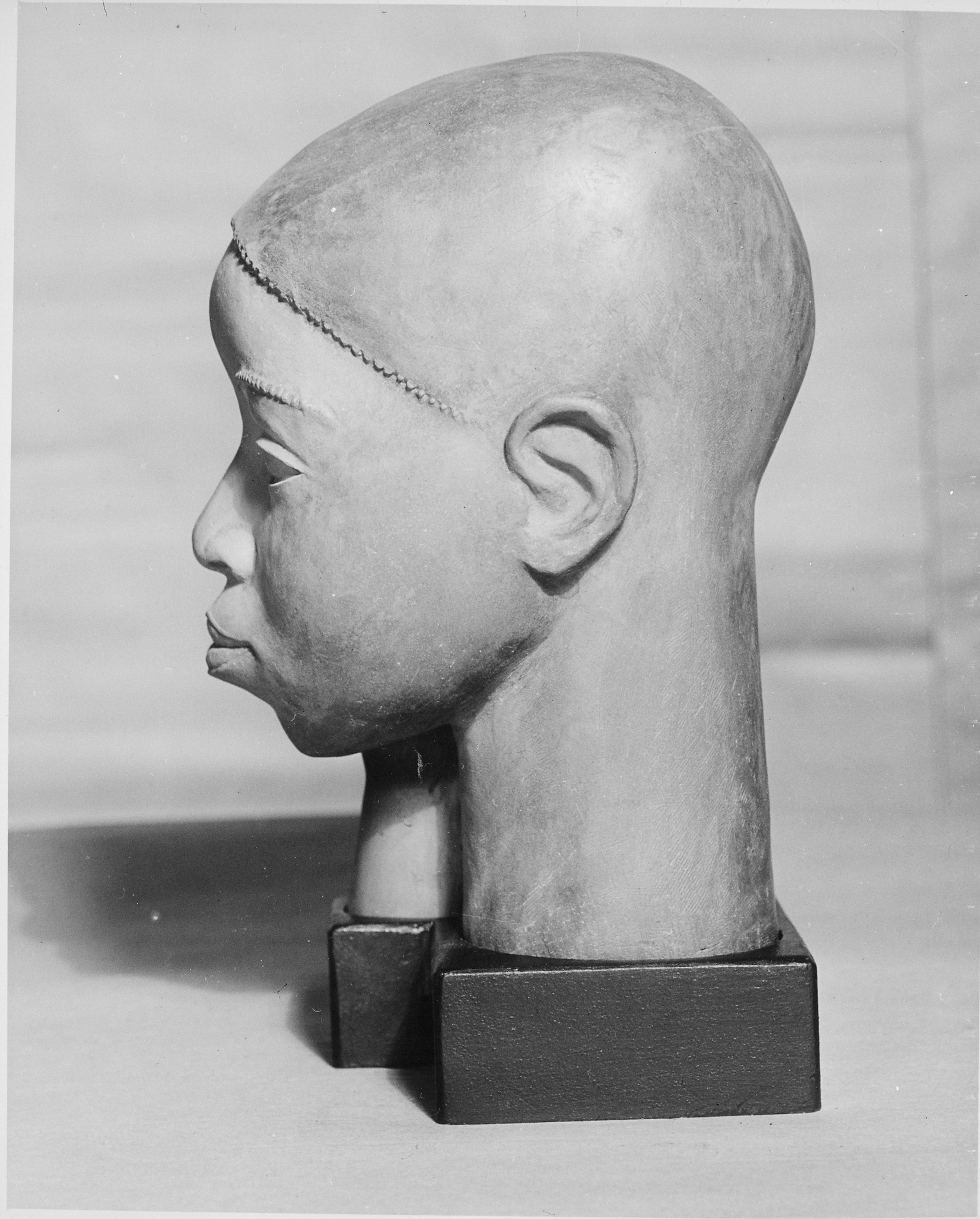
Chester appeared in the 1931 Harmon Foundation touring exhibition. The terra cotta sculpture is now in the San Francisco Museum of Modern Art.

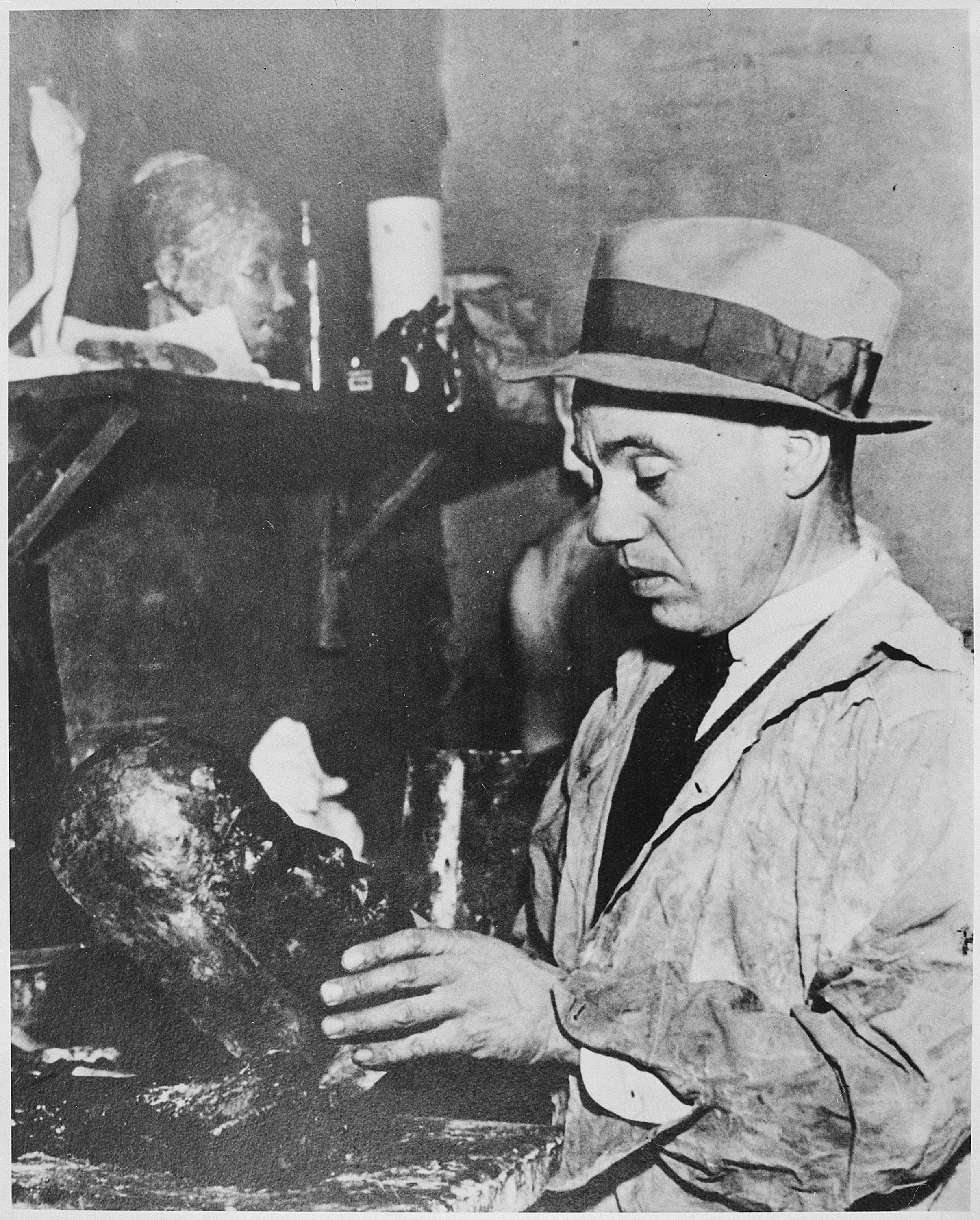
Johnson in his studio in a Harmon Foundation photo now at the National Archives at College Park.

In a 1920 San Francisco city directory, Johnson's profession was listed as "artist." A 1921 directory listed him as "picture framer". (Johnson is said to have worked for Valdespino Framers for about 10 years.) In a directory for 1925, he was listed as an artist working for fine-art photographer Willard Worden, whose studio specialized in hand-painted and finely framed photographs of Bay Area seascapes, landscapes and landmarks.

Beginning in 1927, Johnson's works were included in annual touring exhibitions mounted by the Harmon Foundation of New York, known for supporting African-American art.

The 1931 Harmon exhibition featured Sargent's terra cotta portrait of a boy, Chester, on the cover of the exhibition catalogue. Depicting a neighborhood boy whom the artist described as "that kid [who] used to come to my studio," the work would become Sargent's most award-winning sculpture, "exhibited and published widely during his lifetime, adding to his fame as one of the most-recognized Black sculptors in America."

In the 1933 exhibition, a $150 prize for most outstanding work went to Johnson's Pearl, a glazed stoneware sculpture of his infant daughter.

The 1933 show also included Johnson's drawing Defiant, depicting a standing mother protectively clasping two nude children huddled against her, a work "massively constructed and as simple in its planes as is so much of the modern Mexican work." Also in 1933, Sargent replicated the image in three dimensions with the painted plaster and wood sculpture Forever Free, perhaps his most iconic work, which is now at the San Francisco Museum of Modern Art.

Inspired by Mexican muralists such as Diego Rivera, José Clemente Orozco, and David Alfaro Siqueiros, Sargent, according to one critic, "produced witty, sophisticated work that ranges from jaunty interpretations of African masks to lithographs to small-scale figures."

In the late 1930s, Sargent Johnson received commissions from the Federal Arts Project (FAP). As a member of the bohemian San Francisco Bay community and influenced by the New Negro movement popularized during the Harlem Renaissance, Sargent Johnson's early work focused on racial identity.

Sargent Johnson's work is notable for its clean simplicity, directness, and strength of conception and execution. He focused most of his work on his depictions of African Americans, especially in redefining the image of the African-American woman.

In an interview with the San Francisco Chronicle in 1935, Johnson said, "It is the pure American Negro I am concerned with, aiming to show the natural beauty and dignity in that characteristic lip and that characteristic hair, bearing, and manner; and I wish to show that beauty not so much to the white man as to the Negro himself. Unless I can interest my race, I am sunk...I am interested in applying color to sculpture as the Egyptian, Greek, and other ancient people did...I am concerned with color, not solely as a technical problem, but also as a means of heightening the racial character of my work. The Negroes are a colorful race; they call for an art as colorful as they can be made."

In the course of his career, Johnson created numerous commissions, both public and commercial, for murals, sculptures, and architectural decorations.

From 1945 to 1965, Johnson made a number of trips to Oaxaca and Southern Mexico, where he was particularly interested in archeological sites and artifacts. In 1958, he visited Japan.

== Personal life ==
In 1936, Johnson and his wife separated. His only child, Pearl, was sent to live with her mother. In 1947 his former wife was hospitalized, and in 1964, she died at Stockton State Hospital. Prior to her death, Johnson remained on good terms with her and visited her regularly. His wife and family profoundly affected his artwork, as most of his pieces centered around those he loved.

From 1925 to 1933, Johnson lived in Berkeley at 2777 Park Street, where he established a studio in his backyard. He moved from Berkeley to Telegraph Hill in San Francisco, and then, from 1948 to 1964, to 1507 Grant Avenue, where he lived very simply in two rooms and shared a studio in the building with ceramist John Magnani, a close friend from the early 1930s.

Johnson died from a heart attack at his home in San Francisco on October 10, 1967. He had suffered from severe angina pectoris for nearly two decades.

Photographer Consuelo Kanaga said of Johnson, "He was beautiful in his spirit, the way he talked, the way he thought, the way he worked, the way he felt. I don't mean he didn't have problems. He did—terrible problems—but he was still beautiful. It was his spirit, the way he looked at everything."

Painter Clay Spohn described Johnson as "one of the few persons I have ever known who seemed perennially happy, joyous; exuberant in living, working... I first met Sargent Johnson during the so-called depression of the 1930s, around the time of the early part of the Art Project days; but, in Sargent's case there was no depression, only wonderful opportunities to do his best work, opportunities to allow the spirit to be free to soar wherever it might, but with restraint and compassion for his craft and subject matter."

== In museums ==
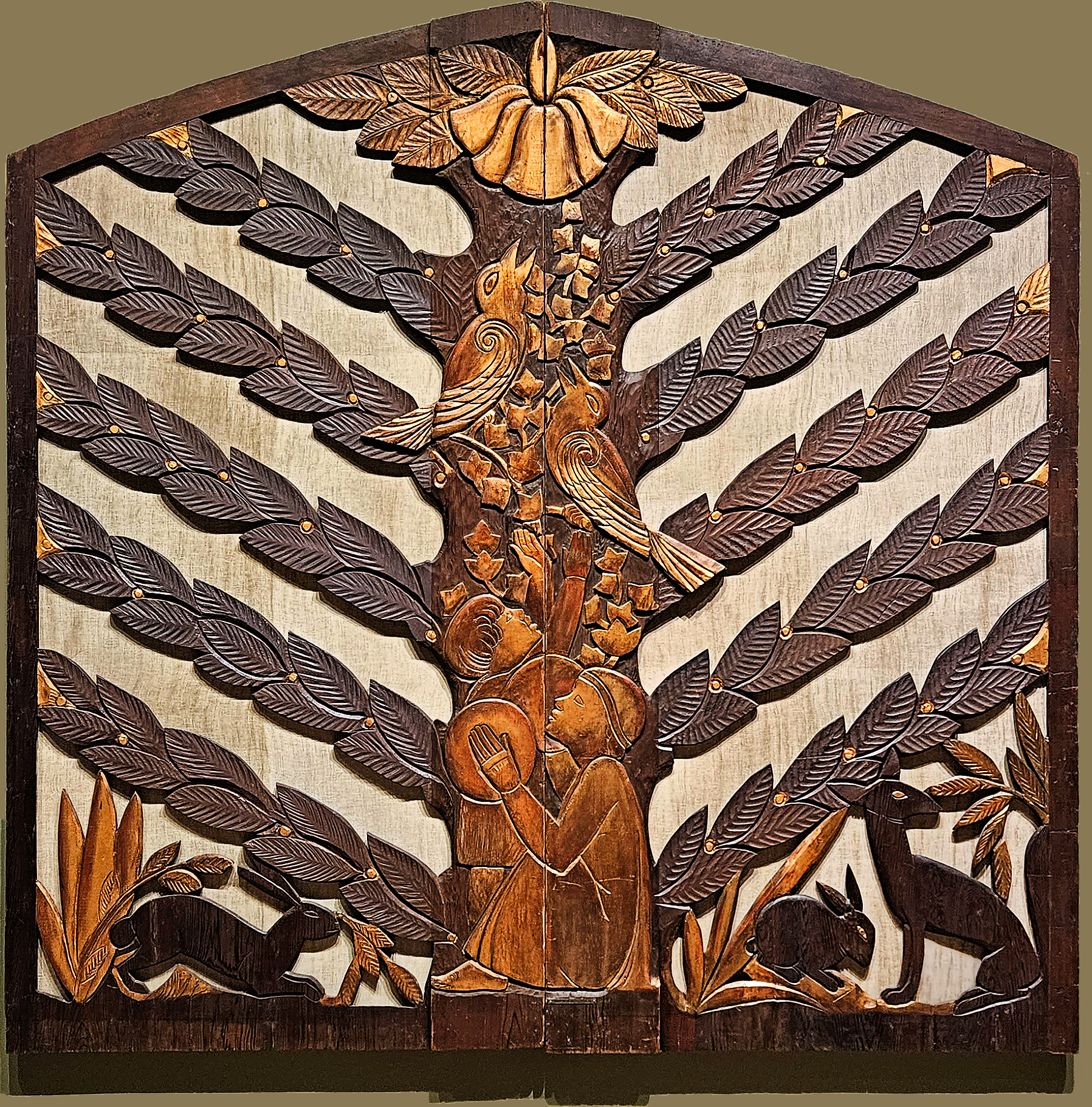
Center panel of the 1937 organ screen now at the Huntington Library.

In 1971, four years after his death, the Oakland Museum of California presented the exhibition Sargent Johnson, Retrospective.

In 1998, the San Francisco Museum of Modern Art mounted the first comprehensive survey of the artist's career with the exhibition Sargent Johnson: African-American Modernist.

In 2009, the University of California, Berkeley unwittingly sold a work by Johnson for $164.63 including tax; gallerist Michael Rosenfeld later estimated its value at more than a million dollars. The 22-foot set of carved redwood relief panels were originally an organ screen in an auditorium at the California School for the Blind, commissioned by the Works Progress Administration in 1937. The organ screen was eventually purchased in 2011 by the Huntington Library in San Marino, California, to be displayed in its new American wing. A large proscenium made by Johnson for the same theater was retained by UC Berkeley, and is now in the collection of the Berkeley Art Museum and Pacific Film Archive.) It was placed on display in the museum as part of the exhibition Object Oriented: Abstraction and Design in the BAMPFA Collection, running September 10, 2025 – July 12, 2026.

In 2024, the Huntington Library presented Sargent Claude Johnson, the first show devoted to the artist since the 1998 exhibition at SFMOMA. The exhibition presented 43 works, including the Huntington's Head of a Boy (c. 1928) and, as its centerpiece, the organ screen reunited for the first time with other decorations made by Johnson for the same auditorium—a stage proscenium lent by the University of California, Berkeley and four lunettes (carved decorations above doorways) lent by the California School for the Blind in Fremont and by the African American Museum and Library at Oakland (part of the Oakland Public Library).

Works by Sargent in various media are in the collections of:

- Amistad Research Center, New Orleans
- Berkeley Art Museum and Pacific Film Archive,
- Brooklyn Museum
- Hampton University Museum, Hampton, Virginia
- Huntington Library, San Marino, California
- Kinsey African American Art and History Collection
- Metropolitan Museum of Art, New York
- Museum of Modern Art, New York.
- The National Gallery of Art, Washington, D.C.
- Newark Museum of Art
- The New Museum
- New Orleans Museum of Art
- Nora Eccles Harrison Museum of Art, Utah State University
- Oakland Museum of California,
- San Diego Museum of Art
- San Francisco African American Historical and Cultural Society
- San Francisco Museum of Modern Art
- Smithsonian American Art Museum
- University of Arizona Museum of Art in Tucson

Perhaps the largest and most varied repository of Johnson's art (more than 25 pieces) is in the privately held Melvin Holmes Collection of African American Art in San Francisco.

== At auction ==
In 2010, Swann Galleries in New York auctioned Johnson's Untitled (Standing Woman), a painted terra cotta sculpture made c. 1933-35, for $52,800, an auction record at the time for the artist. The work is now in the collection of the Brooklyn Museum.

Later in 2010, the record was broken, again at Swann Galleries, by Mask (copper repoussé with gilding, 1933), auctioned for $67,200.

In 2017, Swann Galleries auctioned Untitled (Negro Mother) (copper repoussé with paint, 1935-6) for $100,000.

In 2019, a new auction record for the artist was set by Head of a Negro Boy (painted terra cotta mounted on a wood base, c. 1934), auctioned at Swann Galleries for $125,000.

== Exhibition catalogues ==
- Carr, Dennis; Francis, Jacqueline; Bowles, John P. (editors). Sargent Claude Johnson, Huntington Library and Yale University Press, 2024.
- LeFalle-Collins, Lizzetta and Wilson, Judith. Sargent Johnson: African-American Modernist, San Francisco Museum of Modern Art, 1998.
- Montgomery, Evangeline J. (essay). Sargent Johnson, Retrospective, Oakland Museum, 1971.
