= Frank J. Dillon =

Frank J. Dillon (né Joseph Franklin Dillon; 1867–1954) was an African American artist and stained-glass designer who exhibited widely through the Harmon Foundation in the 1930s. He won an Honorable Mention in the foundation's competition for Black artists in 1929. Dillon's medium was oils and watercolors, and he produced still lifes, portraits and landscapes.

== Early life and education ==
Dillon was born in Mount Holly, New Jersey in 1867. He attended Saint Augustine Normal School and Collegiate Institute from 1883 to 1887 and Oberlin College in Ohio from 1887 to 1889. He took art classes at the Art Students League and the Pennsylvania Museum and School of Industrial Art (now the University of the Arts). He worked as a draftsman and designer at the Hirst Smyrna Rug Manufacturing Company in Vineland, New Jersey.

== Career as painter ==
Dillon made his living as a stained-glass designer and painted in his spare time. His work as a fine artist and stained-glass designer was noted by newspapers at several stops of the Harmon Foundation's traveling exhibit of Black artists. In his seminal book Modern Negro Art, art historian James A. Porter noted Dillon's rank among Black artists. “Other Negro artists deserving attention is the veteran painter Frank J. Dillon who also has designed and executed stained glass windows.”

In 1895, two of Dillon's watercolors and a portrait study were shown in the Negro Building at the Cotton States and International Exposition in Atlanta. In an article, the Pittsburgh Daily Post identified him as a designer for one of the largest stained-glass companies in the country. The newspaper noted that he had "contributed two watercolors of a fair degree of excellence and a portrait study in oils that is even more worthy of praise." Dillon was mentioned along with painter Henry O. Tanner and sculptor Edmonia Lewis.

By the late 1920s, when the Harmon Foundation began its competition and shows, Dillon was much older than the other Black artists who competed for monetary prizes. When the show traveled to Indianapolis in 1930, the local newspaper noted his age of 63.”

He competed in the Harmon competition for the first time in 1929, garnering an Honorable Mention. Five of his paintings were listed in the Harmon catalog: Still Life, Still Life, Christ Blessing the Little Children, Landscape and Tulip. That May, three of the works - Still Life, Still Life and Christ Blessing the Little Children - were in a Smithsonian Institution exhibit titled Paintings and Sculptures by American Negro Artists at the National Gallery of Art. They were part of the foundation’s traveling show across the United States. Dillon was represented in those shows through the 1930s.

Dillon's works and his name were often mentioned in newspapers alongside some of the better-known artists at that time, many like him who were employed in other jobs. During the New York opening, his works caught the attention of several people who were ready to purchase.

In Louisville, KY, one of his still lifes was singled out again in 1929: “The Still Life of Frank J. Dillon shows the influence of practice with stained glass and the big blue dish has the quality more of an enamel. His ‘Christ Blessing Little Children’ reminds somewhat of the less stormy windows by Kent in the English churches.”

Dillon entered the Harmon competition again in 1933. The works Landscape and Tulips were in the catalog.

Most recently, Dillon's works were shown at the Hampton University Museum in Virginia in a 1987 exhibit of works from its permanent collection. The exhibit was titled “Returning Home to Hampton.” In 1990, he was represented in the Newark Museum's exhibit "Against the Odds: African American Artists and the Harmon Foundation."

== Exhibitions ==
- "Exhibitions of Productions by Negro Artists, presented by the Harmon Foundation," New York, 1933.
- 135th Street Branch of the New York Public Library, New York, 1933.
- New Jersey State Museum, Trenton, 1935.
- Harmon Foundation College Art Association, 1934–35.
- Negro Hall, Texas Centennial Exposition, Dallas, "Still Life," 1936.
- Atlanta University Library, 1936.
- Wednesday Art Club, Spokane, WA, 1936.
- Dillard University, New Orleans, 1938.
- Miami University in Oxford, OH, 1937–38.
- Library of Congress, 1930–31.
- Junior League, Elmira, NY, still life, 1941.
- Dillard University, New Orleans, 1941.
- St. Joseph (MO) YWCA, "Apple Blossoms", 1942.
- Montclair Art Museum. New Jersey, 1946.
- Hampton University Museum, 1987.
- Newark Museum, 1990.

== Career as stained glass designer ==
As early as 1895, Dillon was identified as a stained-glass designer and continued to be noted as such in local newspapers. He designed for Marcus Glass Works and Oesterle Glass Works in Philadelphia.

His most public design was a stained-glass window in the chapel at St. Augustine's University, the current name of his alma mater. The design was commissioned by activist and teacher Anna Julia Cooper in 1931 to honor her late husband the Rev. George A.C. Cooper. He had been ordained a minister by the Episcopal Church in North Carolina in 1876. He died in 1879. The painting shows Simon of Cyrene assisting Jesus in carrying the cross.

Both Dillon and Cooper were associated with St. Augustine's and Oberlin College. Their connection was mentioned in a1940 newspaper article pertaining to his work in an exhibit. He was a “well-known Negro painter of Mt. Holly … said to be the only colored person so advanced in the art of stained glass designing as to make it a full-time profession. While a student of Dr. Anna J. Cooper at St. Augustine Academy in Raleigh, North Carolina, he was encouraged to pioneer in this field. Several of his windows may be seen at Frelinghuysen University in Washington, D.C.“ The university no longer exists.

At the time, Dillon had been working for Oesterle for 10 years. He created a stained-glass window circa 1910 that was shown in a watercolor he painted of a room inside his home.

== Personal life ==
Dillon and his wife Leontine were the parents of five children. They lived in Mt. Holly, NJ, and were often mentioned in the Philadelphia Tribune's society pages.
