= William McKnight Farrow =

American artist and curator

William McKnight Farrow (1885–1967) was an American artist and curator active in the early twentieth century. Recognized as a printmaker in his own right, he is best known for his promotion and inspiration of fellow African-American artists who became prominent in the mid-twentieth century.

He was born in Dayton, Ohio. In 1908, he moved to Chicago, Illinois to study at the School of the Art Institute of Chicago. He later became a curator at the Art Institute of Chicago, where he was instrumental in organizing the Institute's 1927 exhibition The Negro in Art Week, a major early exhibition of African-American art. His own work was on display at Chicago's South Side Community Art Center, where it inspired later artists such as Charles White and Gordon Parks. Farrow also wrote a regular arts column for The Chicago Defender and contributed essays to The Crisis.

In addition to his work as a printmaker and curator, Farrow taught art at Carl Schurz High School. He was fired from his teaching job in 1948 following a profile in the Pittsburgh Courier, an African-American newspaper; the school had hired Farrow believing he was white.
