= Malvin Gray Johnson =

American painter (1896–1934)

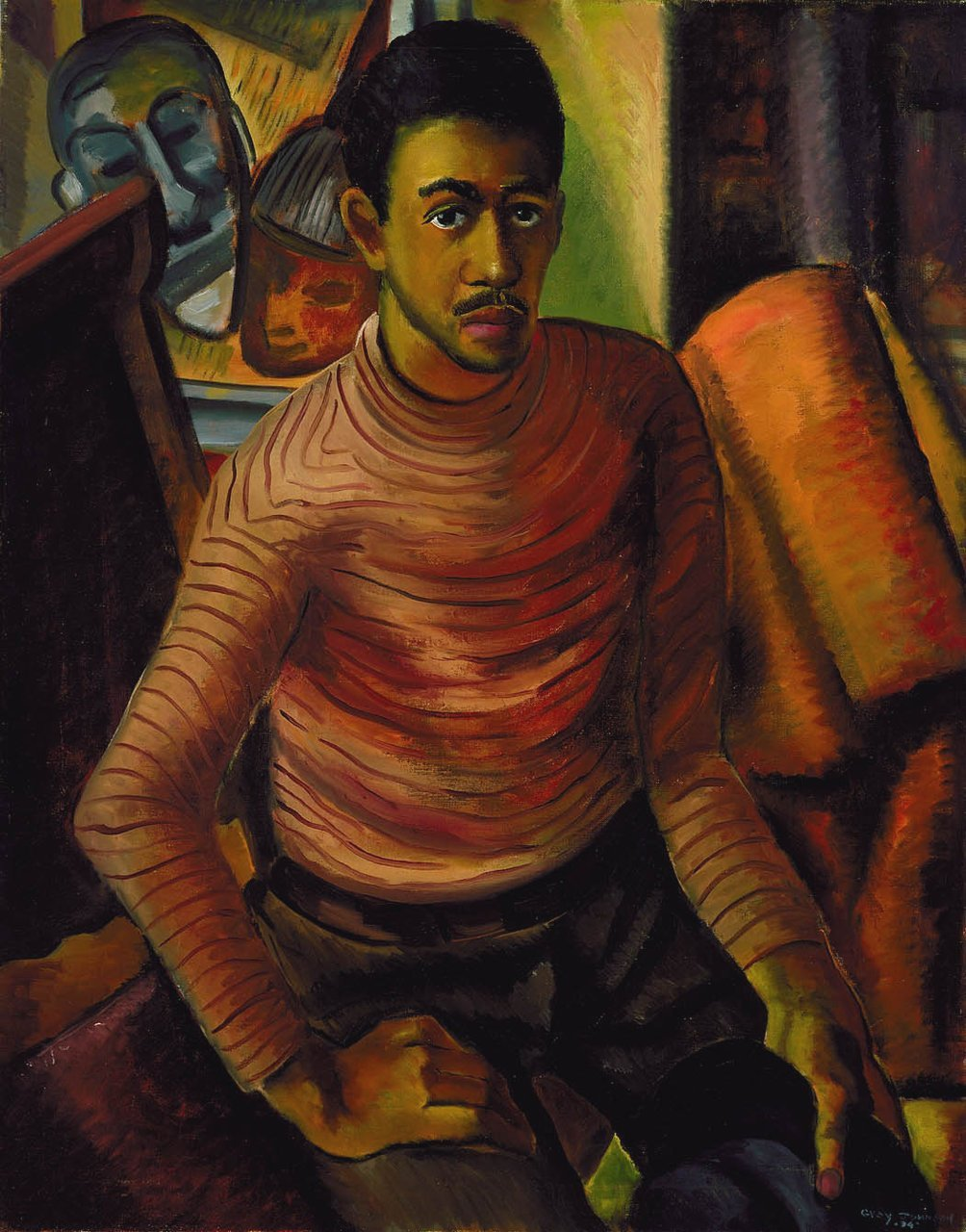
- Malvin Gray Johnson, Self-Portrait (1934)
- Born: January 28, 1896; Greensboro, North Carolina, U.S.
- Died: October 4, 1934 (aged 38); New York, New York, U.S.
- Movement: Harlem Renaissance

Malvin Gray Johnson (January 28, 1896 – October 4, 1934) was an American painter, born and raised in Greensboro, North Carolina.

== Early life and education ==
Gray Johnson began painting at an early age when his sister Maggie noticed his talent and gave him drawing lessons and art supplies when he was a child. His early talent led him to win first place for his artworks in contests in his hometown's annual fairs.

His family later moved to New York City, where he studied art at the National Academy of Design with notable contemporary artists such as Francis Coates Jones. His time in school was interrupted by World War I where he served in the 184th Brigade, 94th Division in France. He rose to prominence during the Harlem Renaissance. He was "the youngest member of the Harlem Renaissance artists...migrated to New York with his family at an early age...where he was influenced by French Impressionism and Cubism."

== Career ==
Johnson "was one of the most far-reaching and versatile artists of his period. He drew upon many stylistic sources and demonstrated the disciplined learning necessary for high levels of creative expression...as he became familiar with the works of the Impressionists and the Cubists his artistic style changed." He is described as an artist "whose work reflects the complexities of the Harlem Renaissance at its pinnacle" despite spending little time with other African American artists during his time in Harlem.

His work is often labeled as Symbolic Abstractionist, being one of the first African-American artists to paint in the Cubist style. He combined early modern styles with distinctly African American subjects, themes, and concerns to create "truly African American art. Elements of his art seem also to derive from studies of African sculpture, Harlem street life, and African Spirituals. He concerned himself with technical aspects of light, composition, and form, and a desire to express the experience of the spirituals in terms of abstract symbolism. His painting style is described as a modernist-inspired with vigorous brushwork, intense areas of color, flattened and angular forms, and a lack of painterly finish. Some of his critics admired how he explored African American subjects with authenticity and sincerity while others admonished his loose handling of paint and modernist sensibility.

Like many other artists, Johnson worked on the New Deal art projects during the Depression. His work was displayed in many of the Harmon Exhibits in 1929 and the early 1930s. In 1931 some of his work was hung in the Anderson gallery and the following year, the Salon of America displayed several of his paintings. In 1928 he won a prize at a Harmon exhibition, and in 1929 he won the Otto H. Kahn prize of 250 dollars for painting. "Johnson's painting 'Swing Low, Sweet Chariot' was awarded the 1929 exhibition prize for best picture in the second Harmon group show."

Johnson was featured in the 1930s film A Study of Negro Artists, along with Richmond Barthé, James Latimer Allen, Palmer Hayden, Aaron Douglas, William Ellisworth Artis, Augusta Savage, Lois Mailou Jones, Georgette Seabrooke, and others associated with the Harlem Renaissance.

Working for the Public Works of Art Project in 1934, Johnson produced a group of works portraying urban and rural blacks, many of which were set in Brightwood, Virginia. The collection included 14 oils and 15 watercolors. Johnson provided an extensive dictation of his pieces the Harmon Foundation, which is on record at the Library of Congress. These paintings from his final year of life are considered some of his finest works. These pieces were set to be displayed in an exhibition at the Delphic Studios Gallery in New York at the end of the year.

In The Negro in American Culture, Margaret Just Butcher, argued that some of Johnson's paintings "are among the most significant commentaries on the American Negro scene." Alain LeRoy Locke said that Johnson captured the cynical humor and mythical desolation in the moods of blacks better than most artists. Viewing Johnson as a maturing experimentalist, James A. Porter wrote that his later work was expressed in terse, pregnant patches of color.

The exhibition of his oils, watercolors and drawings in 2002 at North Carolina Central University was the first since his death in 1934.

== Auction records ==
On February 23, 2010, Swann Galleries auctioned Malvin Gray Johnson's celebrated painting Swing Low, Sweet Chariot, oil on canvas, 1928–29, for $228,000. It was the first time any significant work by Johnson had come to auction.

== Works ==
- Meditation, 1931
- Swing Low, Sweet Chariot, 1929
- Woman Washing
- Negro masks, 1932
- Arrangement, 1933
- Toussaint L'Ouverture, 1933
- Harmony, 1933
- Sailor, 1933
- Nat Turner, 1934
- Postman, 1934
- Negro soldier, 1934
- Self-Portrait, 1934
- Brothers, 1934
- The Elks
- Harriet Tubman and Frederick Douglass
- Negro Pharaoh—Eighteenth Dynasty
- Roll, Jordan, Roll, 1930
- Dixie Madonna
- Ruby
- Red Road
- Convict Labor
- Booker T. Washington (lost)

== Bibliography ==
- Margaret Just Butcher, The Negro in American Culture, New York: Knopf, 1972. ISBN 0-394-47943-2
- Mary Ann Calo, Distinction and Denial: Race, Nation and the Critical Construction of the African American Artist, 1920–40, Ann Arbor: University of Michigan Press, 2007.
- Jacqueline Francis, Climbing up the Mountain: the Modern Art of Malvin Gray Johnson, Durham NC: North Carolina Central University Art Museum, 2002.
- Alain LeRoy Locke, Negro Art: Past and Present, Washington DC: Associates in Negro Folk Education, 1936.
- James Amos Porter, Modern Negro Art, New York: Dryden Press, 1943.
