= James Latimer Allen =

American photographer (born 1907)

James Latimer Allen (1907–1977) was a photographer and portraitist known for his images of the Harlem Renaissance of the 1920s and 1930s.

== Biography ==
Allen was born in New York City, and by the late 1920s he built a photography studio in which many of the elites from the era was photographed. Among the figures he photographed includes Langston Hughes, Paul Robeson, Alain Locke, and Carl Van Vechten.

== Artistic work ==
According to New York Times art critic William Zimmer, Allen's work helped "underscored the emergence" of "The New Negro" philosophy of the time. His work showed a "purposeful uniformity" that he believed captured this idea of an upper-class, well-educated African American. All of his subjects were well dressed, and photographed with a soft focus, similar to that of portraits of intelligentsia at that time. These images were called portraits of distinction, and featured important figures to the Harlem Renaissance such as Langston Hughes and Countee Cullen.

Allen's work appeared in several popular publications by proponents and supporters of the Harlem Renaissance movement, such as The Opportunity, The Messenger, and The Crisis. He was featured in the 1930s film A Study of Negro Artists, along with Richmond Barthé, Aaron Douglas, Palmer Hayden, William Ellisworth Artis, Malvin Gray Johnson, Augusta Savage, Lois Mailou Jones, and Georgette Seabrooke, and others. According to Camara Dia Holloway author of "Allen, James Latimer" records show Allen enlisted in World War 2.

== Posthumous publicity ==
His work was exhibited in Yale University Art Gallery in 1999. He was awarded a $50 commission prize by the Harmon Foundation for his work in photography as a Negro artist. The show in 1933, however, was said to not be very representative of the work being done nationwide by Negro artists.
