= CFAE =

CFAE may refer to:

- complex fractionated atrial electrogram, a recording of the electrical signals of certain abnormal heart conditions
- Council for Art Education, Inc.
