= Karen Keifer-Boyd =

American art educator (born 1955)

Karen Keifer-Boyd (born December 7, 1955) is an American art educator. She has written and co-written several articles and books in the field of art education, focusing on feminist pedagogy, inclusion, disability justice, transdisciplinary creativity, transcultural dialogue, and social justice arts-based research. So co-founded, with Deborah Smith-Shank, the art education journal Visual Culture and Gender. She has received many awards for leadership and teaching.

== Education ==
Keifer-Boyd holds a bachelor's of fine art from the Kansas City Art Institute and a master's of science and doctorate in art education from the University of Oregon.

== Career ==
Karen Keifer-Boyd is the current professor of art education and of women's studies at Penn State University. She has written articles on feminist pedagogy. The articles are found in more than 45 peer-reviewed research publications and translated into many different languages.

Her pedagogy articles include: Judy Chicago's content-based art pedagogy, CyberNetculture, intertextuality, cyberNet activism art pedagogy, arts-based and action research, transcultural dialogues, CyberHouse and identity speculative fiction. She is also the co-author of InCITE, InSIGHT, InSITE (NAEA, 2008), Engaging Visual Culture (Davis, 2007), and was the editor of the Journal of Social Theory in Art Education, and guest editor for Visual Art Research. She has been the co-authors to other readings as well. Keifer-Boyd also co-founded International Multimedia Journal Visual Culture & Gender.

== Artwork ==
Karen Keifer-Boyd created a piece in 2001 called, Write/Erase. This piece was an interactive watercolor installation. She used this piece to call attention to the erased cultural memory of women's contribution to society by filling the “hole” with water. The viewers could take a cloth and erase another's history written on the stones by her feet, and then write their own. Another work is Cyberhouse, created in 2013 with PHP, Flash, and PhotoShop. Cyberhouse is a computer game of inquiry, it gives the viewer reflections on self and possibilities to restore themselves. The players' identity changes constantly through cyborging (through sensory translation, extensions, and transformations through human interactions. Keifer-Boyd used building attributes to reflect human experiences and creates a metaphorical use in everyday language (e.g., one step at a time, frame your ideas, a window of opportunity).

== Books ==
Keifer-Boyd co-wrote Including Difference with Michelle Kraft in 2013. Including Difference is about co-creating inclusive classroom communities for a range of different learners.

== Awards ==
Karen Keifer-Boyd has been honored with leadership and teaching awards including the National Art Education Distinguished Fellow 2013. She is the 2005 recipient of the Kathy Connors Teaching Award from the National Art Education Association Women's Caucus. She received the 2013 National Ziegfeld Award from the United States Society for Education through Art. Keifer-Boyd became a Distinguished Fellow of the National Art Education Association in 2013.
Keifer-Boyd is a regional, national and international influence. She has one of the most important private collections of archival materials on feminist art education, she was the president of the Women's Caucus and the co-founder of the Graduate Research in Art Education annual conference.

In an article on the Penn State webpage Keifer-Boyd stated: “Ziegfeld's work is a commitment to ideas of social justice, and that the visual arts can speak across borders: national, political, cultural, geographical, disciplinary, linguistic, and personal—a belief that I share and embed in all the work I do.”
