= Nancy Frankel =

American sculptor (1929–2021)

- Born: Nancy Ann Frankel; May 8, 1929; Orange, N.J.
- Died: July 28, 2021 (aged 92); Kensington, Maryland
- Website: nancyfrankel.com

Nancy Ann Frankel (May 8, 1929 – July 28, 2021) was an American sculptor based in Washington, D.C. Her work explores "organic geometric" forms in a variety of media, including wood, Plexiglas, Hydrocal, design cast, and steel.

== Biography and training ==
Frankel was born Nancy Ann Disbrow in Orange, N.J. She was raised in nearby East Orange by her maternal grandmother after her parents's divorce. She studied art at the Tyler School of Art at Temple University. Frankel earned her master's of fine arts degree at Columbia University. While living in New York City, Frankel took a painting course with Hans Hofmann, where she was exposed to abstract impressionism. She moved to the Washington, D.C. area in 1963.

== Career and work ==
Frankel began sculpting while at Temple University. After earning her MFA, Frankel learned how to weld at the SculptureCenter. Although she practiced regularly in the years following World War II, Frankel described herself and her work as "invisible" until her interaction with other women artists at the 1972 Conference of Women in the Visual Arts, which was held at the Corcoran Gallery of Art in Washington, D.C. This conference allowed women artists, including Frankel, to navigate professional vetting structures — known as slide registries — by which an artist's work became known to area galleries. In 2019, the Katzen Arts Center at American University mounted a retrospective exhibition of Nancy Frankel's work - "Nancy at Ninety: A Retrospective of Form and Color."

== Death ==
Frankel died at the age of 92 in her Kensington, Maryland, home. Her 26-year-old roommate, Julia Birch, confessed to suffocating her and was charged with first-degree murder. Birch was known to Frankel’s family. According to police reports, their relatives had met through working with the Catholic church in Maryland.

== Collections ==
- Conversation I. University of Maryland at the Clarice Smith Performing Arts Center. College Park, Maryland.
- Whimsey, 2009. Embassy of Bulgaria. Washington, D.C.
- Clarity, 2010. American University Museum at the Katzen Arts Center. Washington, D.C.
