= Arlington Museum of Art =

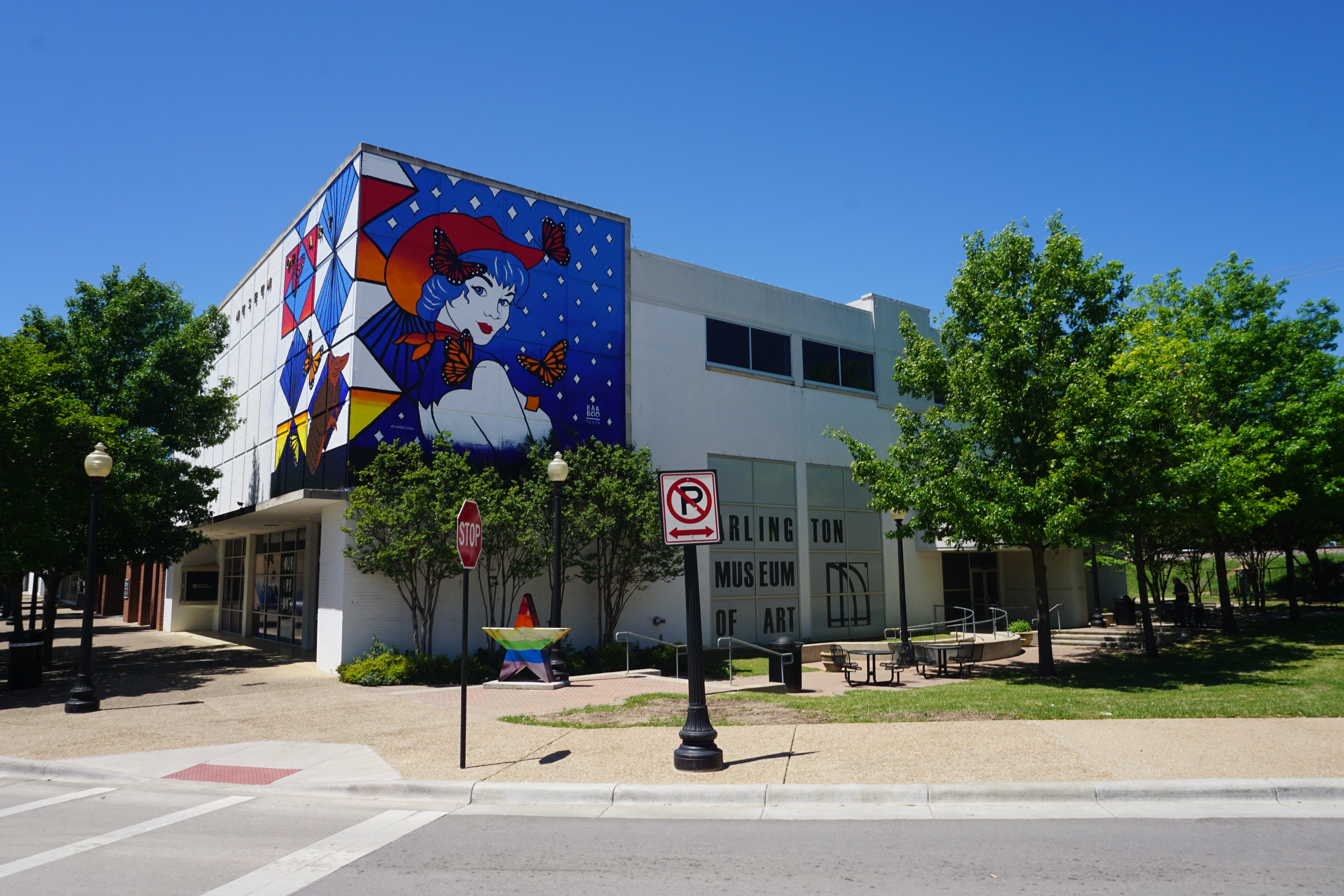
- Previous location of the Arlington Museum of Art

- Location within Texas Location within the United States
- Established: 1989
- Location: Arlington, Texas, United States
- Coordinates: 32°45′18″N 97°4′55″W
- Type: Art museum
- Founders: Howard and Arista Joyner
- CEO: Chris Hightower
- Website: arlingtonmuseum.org

The Arlington Museum of Art is a non-collecting art museum located in Arlington, Texas. It hosts art exhibitions and also offers art-related adult workshops, children's classes, film screenings, and lectures. A not-for-profit 501(c)(3) organization managed by a board of directors, it showcases internationally renowned collections in partnership with museums and private collectors from around the world. In 2024, the AMA moved from its previous location in downtown Arlington to the Arlington Expo Center in the city's Entertainment District.

== History ==
The Arlington Museum of Art traces its history to the foundation of the Arlington Art Association by Howard and Arista Joyner in 1952. Howard Joyner established the Art Department at the University of Texas at Arlington, and Arista Joyner was the first art teacher at Arlington High School. The Arlington Art Association promoted art in the city by sponsoring juried art exhibitions, shows featuring local artists, and art auctions benefiting scholarships for local high school students, while also creating a savings fund to eventually purchase a building to serve as its permanent home. In 1986, the Arlington Art Association bought the former J. C. Penney store on Main Street in downtown Arlington, which it remodeled extensively and moved into in 1989 after incorporating as the Arlington Museum of Art. The first exhibition at the museum opened in May 1990 and featured contemporary art.

In 1991, former Dallas Museum of Art assistant curator for contemporary art and KERA radio art critic Joan Davidow was hired as the full-time director of the Arlington Museum of Art. Under her tenure, which lasted until September 2000, she focused the museum's curated exhibitions on Texas contemporary art. In her first three years as director, she tripled the museum's budget to $225,000 while securing corporate sponsorships from Lockheed Martin, Target, and U.S. Trust. Writing for Texas Monthly in 1998, Michael Ennis referred to Davidow as "arguably the most imaginative and irrepressibly adventurous museum director working in Texas" and a "champion of the latest and often most contentious Texas art". She also ran an art summer camp for children at the museum and a Saturday-afternoon family component for each of the museum's exhibitions.

In February 2001, Anne Allen was hired as the new director of the Arlington Museum of Art, having previously served in the same capacity at the Old Jail Art Center in Albany, Texas. During the six years of her tenure, she added new programs such as artist lectures and gallery talks to the museum's calendar of exhibitions. The museum was reorganized in 2012 due to its financial needs and the impact of a weak economy, and former board member Chris Hightower was selected as its new director. Under his tenure, the museum has broadened its scope beyond contemporary art and now features "historically significant and culturally important exhibitions". The museum has also begun supporting its exhibitions with accompanying programming, funding them through grants, and renting its facilities for outside events.

In 2015, local philanthropist Sam Mahrouq donated $550,000 to the Arlington Museum of Art, which allowed it to retire its building mortgage. In 2016, the museum gained notoriety when it removed a satirical poster depicting Donald Trump from an exhibition due to the objection of a board member.

In early 2024, through an agreement approved by the Arlington City Council in April 2023, the Museum relocated to the City’s Esports Stadium and Expo Center, located near Choctaw Stadium and the future National Medal of Honor Museum. The special use agreement provides the Arlington Museum of Art with approximately 48,000 square feet of space inside the Expo Center compared to the 5,500 square feet that was available its previous location at 201 W. Main St. in downtown Arlington.

== Exhibitions ==
The Arlington Museum of Art has hosted numerous traveling exhibitions, including those featuring photography by Ansel Adams, art by Salvador Dalí, Milton H. Greene's photographs of Marilyn Monroe, Harlem Renaissance artwork (including works by Richmond Barthé, Aaron Douglas, Jacob Lawrence, and Charles White), Utagawa Hiroshige's woodblock prints, Vivian Maier's street photography, art by Knox Martin, and Pablo Picasso's ceramics. It has also featured an exclusive exhibit on Keith Haring. Additionally, it has featured exhibitions of edible art sculptures and film costumes, including those of Johnny Depp from Pirates of the Caribbean and Emmy Rossum from The Phantom of The Opera.

== Gallery ==
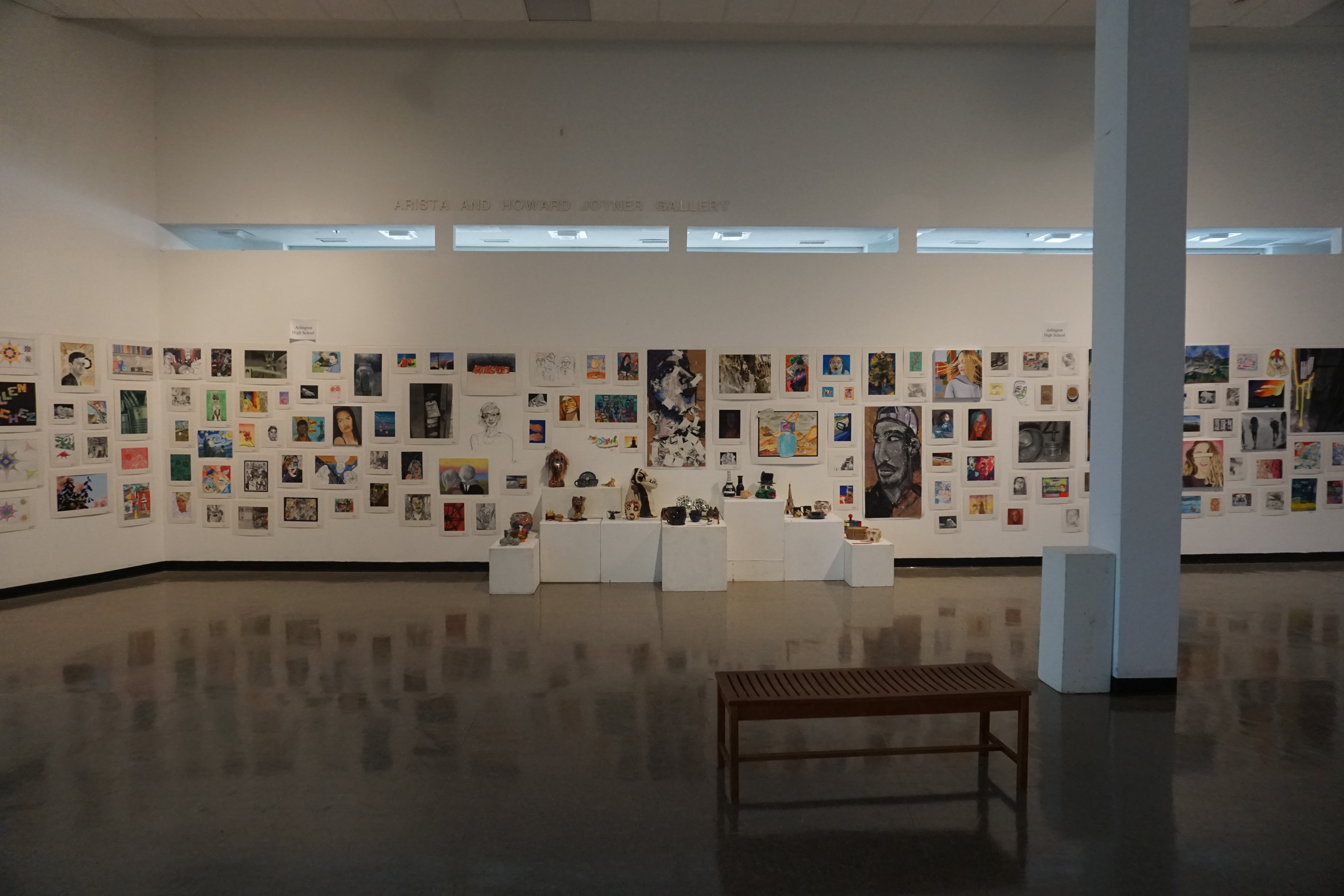
Museum interior, during Youth Art Month

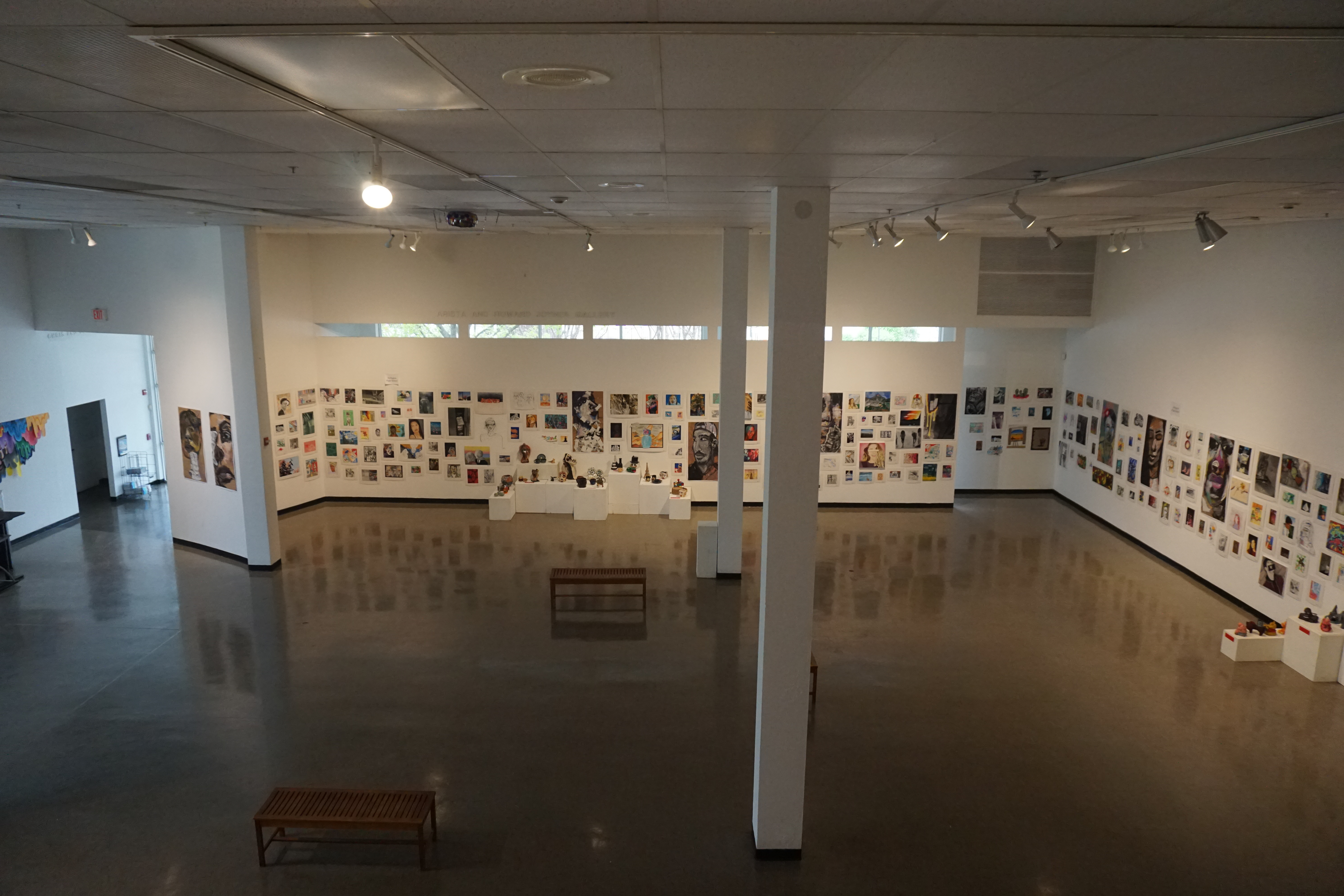
Museum interior

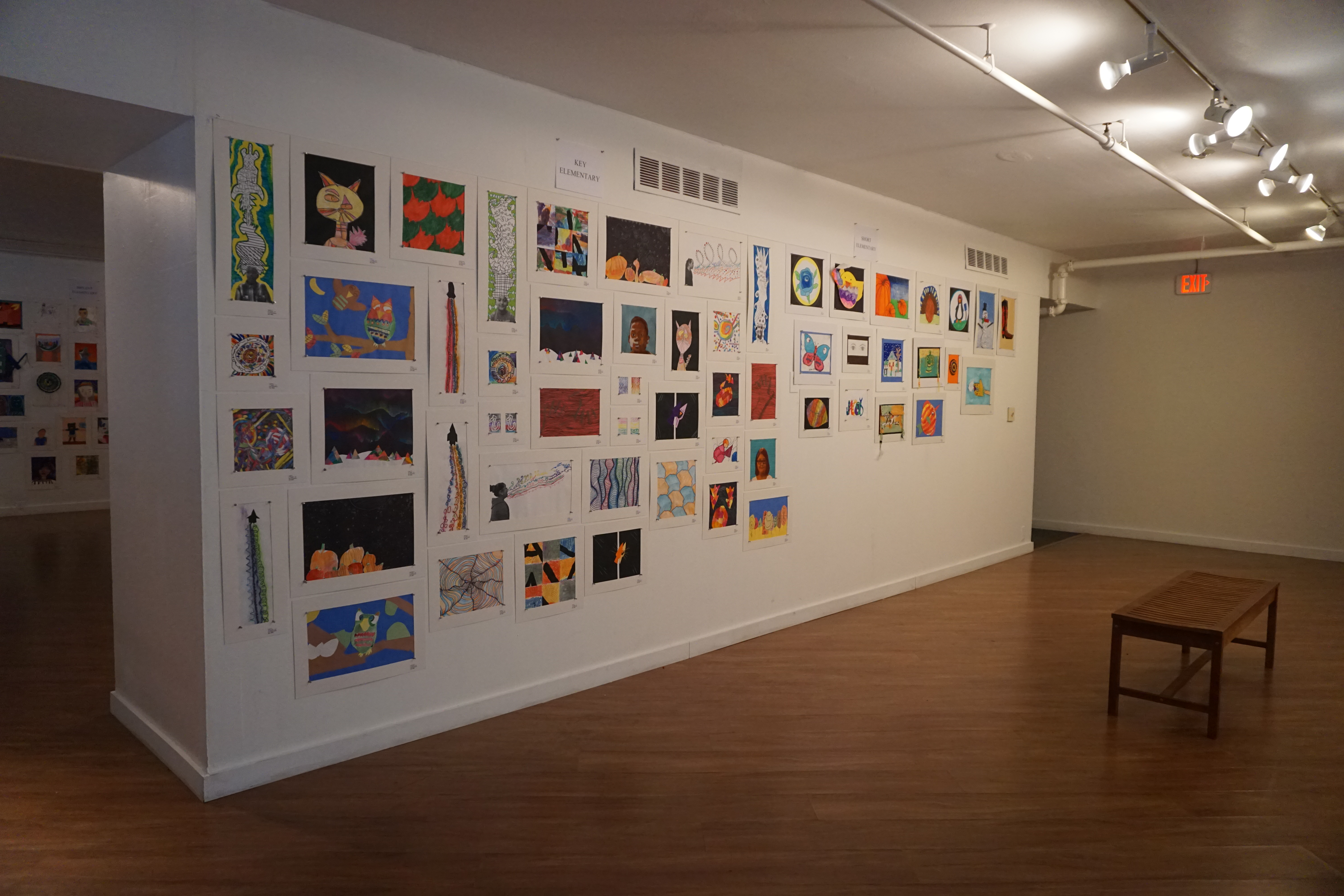
Museum interior

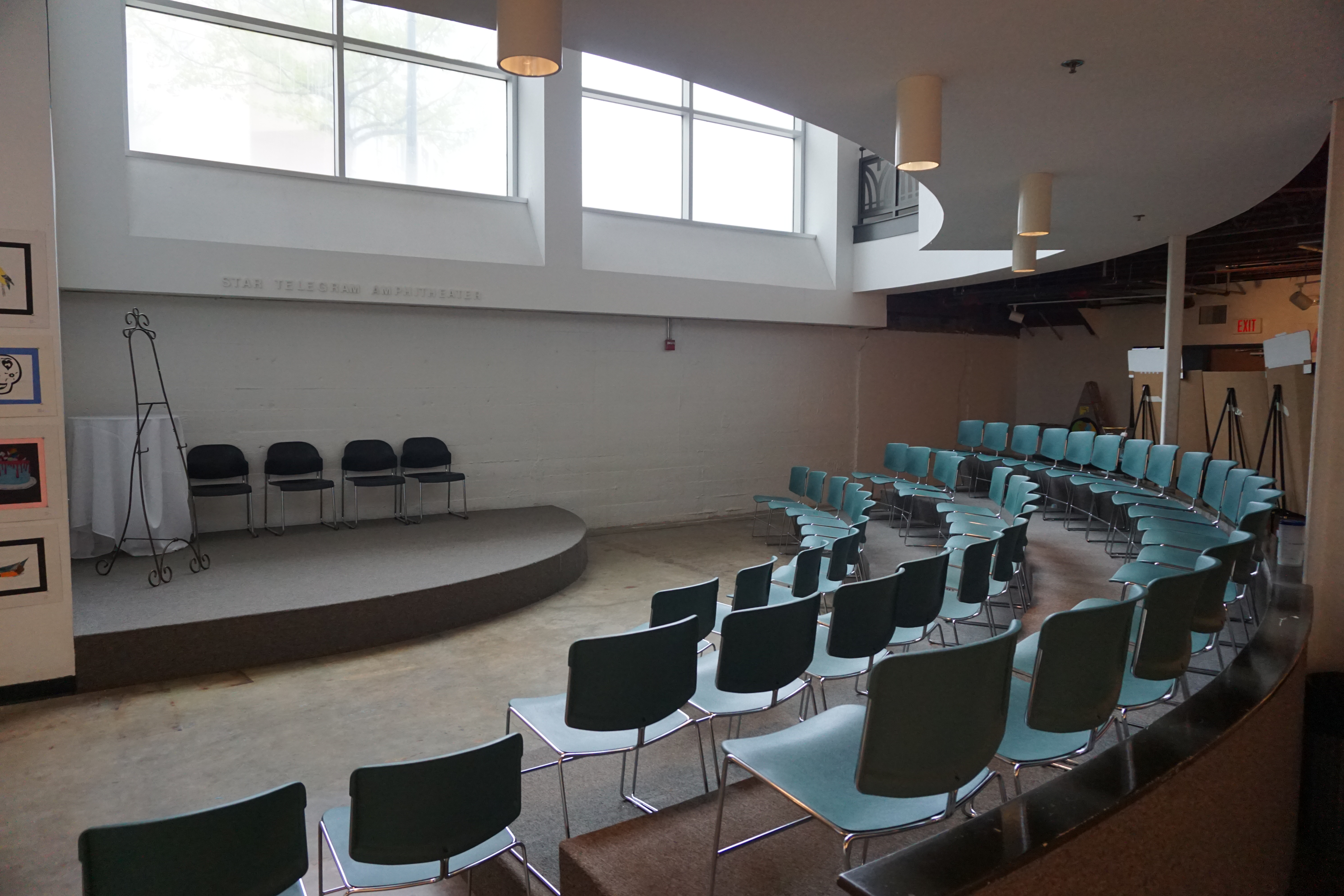
Star-Telegram Amphitheater
