= Cynthia Bickley-Green =

American painter

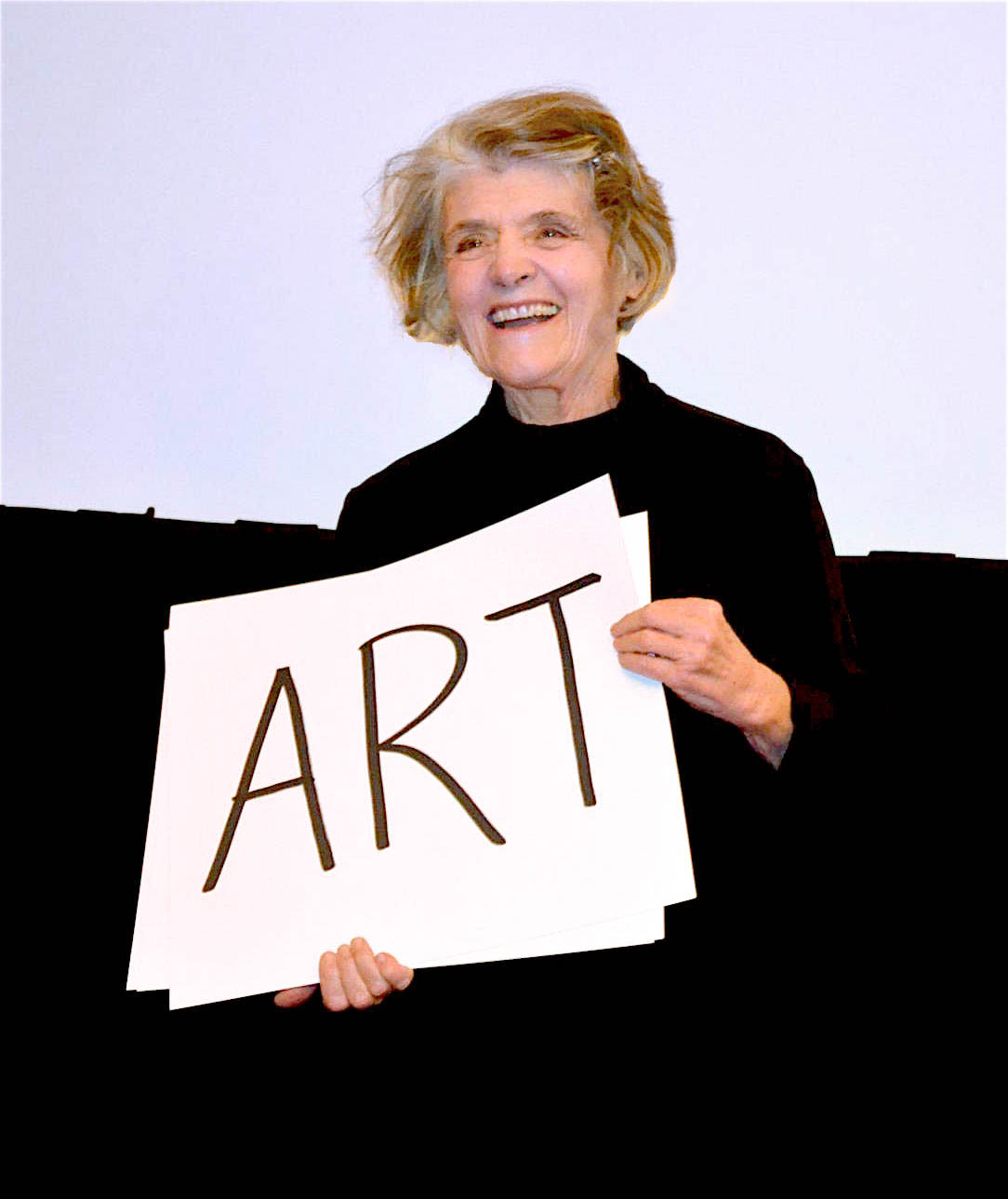
- Bickley-Green in 2012
- Born: Cynthia Bickley
- Known for: Painting, Educator

Cynthia Bickley-Green is an American painter associated with the Washington Color school. She teaches art at the School of Art and Design at East Carolina University.

Bickley-Green attended University of Maryland and received her PhD from University of Georgia. In the 1960s and 70s Bickley-Green exhibited her work along with Gene Davis, Morris Louis, Kenneth Noland and was associated with the Washington Color School. She was associated with the A.I.R. Gallery in the 1970s. In 1972 she was one of the organizers of the first National Conference of Women in the Visual Arts at the Corcoran Gallery of Art in Washington DC.

Her image is included in the 1972 poster Some Living American Women Artists by Mary Beth Edelson.

Bickley-Green teaches at East Carolina University In In 2014 she was the recipient of the Meryl Fletcher de Jong Service Award from the National Art Education Association Women's Caucus.
