= A Study of Negro Artists =

1930 silent film

A Study of Negro Artists is a 1935 short silent film in black and white on four reels that was created to highlight the development of African-American fine arts. The film features many influential black artists associated with the Harlem Renaissance. The 37-minute motion picture was made by Jules V. D. Bucher.

A Study of Negro Artists

== Funding ==
The Harmon Foundation produced the film, which screened at the New York Public Library in April 1935 as a fundraiser for the Harlem Art Workshop. In creating A Study of Negro Artists, the Harmon Foundation hoped to educate the American public about the rich African-American arts scene developing in New York City.

== Significance ==
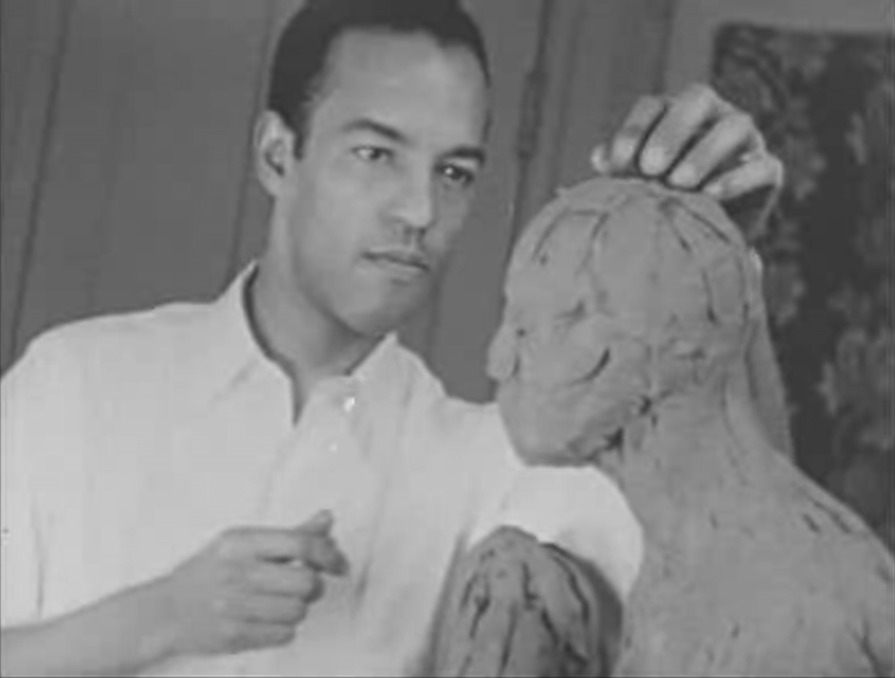
Richmond Barthé at work in his studio in A Study of Negro Artists.

The film is an example of the New Negro Arts movement associated with the Harlem Renaissance. It also exemplifies the tendency to segregate artistic achievement according to perceived racial differences.

Art critic John Ott has suggested that efforts by the Harmon Foundation of this kind "eclipses African American artistic endeavors with images of black menial employment." According to Ott, the film implies that artistic work is a leisure activity, but synonymous with labor by focusing attention on the working bodies of the featured artists, rather than the products of their work. Inter-titles further this suggestion:

- "Until recognition comes, the artist seeks a living wherever he can."
- "The leisure thus gained leaves him free to work again for fame and recognition,"
- "The Negro artist today must work with his hands to earn a living; his art is but a spare-time activity."

== Featured artists ==
- James Latimer Allen
- Charles Alston
- William Ellisworth Artis
- Richmond Barthé
- Aaron Douglas
- Robert S. Duncanson
- Palmer Hayden
- Malvin Gray Johnson
- Sargent Claude Johnson
- Lois Mailou Jones
- Benjamin Spurgeon Kitchin
- Richard William Lindsey
- Susie Maribel McIver
- Pastor Argudin y Pedroso
- James A. Porter
- Augusta Savage
- Georgette Seabrooke
- Arthur Alfonso Schomburg
- Henry Ossawa Tanner
- Hale A. Woodruff
