= National Art Honor Society =

American high school honor society

- Founded: 1978; 48 years ago United States
- Type: Honor
- Affiliation: National Art Education Association
- Status: Active
- Emphasis: Art, grades 9-12
- Scope: National
- Colors: Rainbow; Red; Orange; Yellow; Green; Cyan; Blue; Violet
- Publication: NAHS News
- Members: 54,000 active
- Headquarters: 901 Prince Street; Alexandria, Virginia 22314; United States
- Website: www.arteducators.org/national-art-honor-societies

The National Art Honor Society (NAHS) is an American honor society for high school students. It was established in 1978 by the National Art Education Association (NAEA) to recognize outstanding accomplishments in the visual arts by students in grades 9 to 12. The NAEA also supports a National Junior Art Honor Society for grades 6 to 8.

== History ==
=== National Art Honor Society ===
The National Art Education Association (NAEA) established the National Art Honor Society (NAHS) in 1978 for high school students grades 9-12 The NAHS recognizes outstanding accomplishments in the visual arts, fosters its members creativity and talents, and promotes art to schools and their communities.

As of 2024, NAHS has 54,000 student members in the United States, the U.S. territories, and 25 other countries. Its headquarters are with the NAEA at 901 Prince Street in Alexandria, Virginia. Its partner organization is the National Junior Art Honor Society for grades 6 to 8.

=== National Junior Art Honor Society ===

The National Art Education Association established the National Junior Art Honor Society (NJAHS) in 1989 for middle school students in grades 6–8. Its purpose is to help recognize and inspire interested students to do more with their creative abilities. It also motivates students to join the National Art Honor Society in high school.

== Symbols ==
The society's colors are the rainbow (red, orange, yellow, green, cyan, blue, and violet). Students who have been members for two years can wear a rainbow colored honor cord at graduation or a rainbow mortarboard tassel.

The society's publication, NAHS News, is a semi-annual digital newsletter. The newsletter features artwork, photos, and reports from all NAHS chapters.

== Membership ==
Students are eligible for membership if they are of good character and have taken a high school art class with at least a 3.0 GPA. To remain a member, students must continue their enrollment in an art class and complete community service hours through the visual arts.

== Activities ==
Members participate in service projects in their schools and communities. Members can participate in art shows, are eligible for several awards, and are encouraged to submit articles and artwork for the semi-annual publication in the NAHS News. The society awards its Charles M. Robertson Memorial Scholarship to the Pratt Institute School of Art and Design and other scholarships to The Art Institute, the Columbus College of Art and Design, and the Maryland Institute College of Art to members who are seniors. The society also holds an annual convention for members and chapter sponsors.

== See also ==
- Honor society
- Honor cord
- High school fraternities and sororities
