= Art-based research =

Art-based research is a mode of formal qualitative inquiry that uses artistic processes in order to understand and articulate the subjectivity of human experience.

== History ==
The term was first coined by Elliot Eisner, who was a professor of Art and Education at the Stanford Graduate School of Education and one of the United States' leading academic minds. Eisner used the term "art-based research" as the title of a conference presentation held at Stanford University in 1993.

Subsequently, the concept of art-based research was defined by Shaun McNiff, professor of Creative Arts Therapies at Lesley College, as "the systematic use of the artistic process, the actual making of artistic expressions in all of the different forms of the arts, as a primary way of understanding and examining experience by both researchers and the people that they involve in their studies". It was later additionally defined as "research that uses the arts, in the broadest sense, to explore, understand, represent and even challenge human action and experience".

Many practitioners of art-based research trace the origins of their approach to the work of German arts theorist and psychologist Rudolf Arnheim, and American philosopher Susanne Langer, both of whom elucidated the use of artistic experimentation and production as a means by which to acquire and document knowledge about the art, the artist, and its audience, inspiring a range of academic programs that facilitated students in using the process of making art, including performance, painting, and music as the means by which to understand the nature of human experience, teaching, and learning.

Arts-Based research is often paired with action research, participatory action research and community-based participatory research methodologies.

Today, art-based research is employed not only in arts education, but also in health care, management, the social and behavioral sciences, and the technology sector.

== Branches ==
=== Feminist arts-based research ===
Feminist arts-based research draws on the principles of the feminist movement and feminist art, committed to gender equality as it intersects with the vast array of social life and social justice issues. Feminist arts-based research requires researchers to critically reflect on their practice and positionally as artists and researchers. As Karen Keifer-Boyd states, feminist arts-based research "examines gender inequalities manifested in different forms of privilege and oppression, and exposes the pervasiveness of gender entangled with race and class in structuring social life".

=== Queer arts-based research ===
Drawing on queer studies and theory as well the historical artistic activism of the LGBT movements such as ACT UP or the NAMES Project AIDS Memorial Quilt, queer arts-based research seeks to question and deconstruct normative binaries, hetero- and cis-normativity, and make space for queer ways of knowing and being in the world. Oxford Research Encyclopedias on Communication state that queer arts-based research "allows individuals to question the taken-for-granted conventions that shape social understanding of gender, sex, and sexuality in a subjective and participatory way".

=== Disability arts-based research ===
Disability arts-based research focuses on addressing negative ideology regarding disability through building knowledge from and with people with disabilities, and challenge discourses about disabled people without their involvement. Following the values of the disability rights movement, researchers and participants engaging in disability arts-based research are committed to maintain voice, agency, and dignity for disabled people.

== A/r/tography ==
Expanding on Eisner's ideas, researchers in Canada developed a discipline they named "a/r/tography", a hybrid form of practice-based research within education and the arts. A/r/tography stands for artmaking, researching, and teaching. It is a popular methodology for artists, teachers and makers in which a/r/tography transforms information and the relationships between art-making, research and theory in order to inform the public on various issues. For example, Australian artist, art theorist, and educator, Graeme Sullivan, states that "Arts-informed researchers, [artographers], and the like, have a similar interest in schools, community and culture, but their focus is on developing the practitioner-researcher who is capable of imaginative and insightful inquiry."

Further developments in arts-based approaches as a means of communicating complex research ideas from diverse research sources have been integral to practical and conceptual innovations, merging the domains of arts-based research and knowledge translation research in the health science and the social sciences. This domain of arts-based knowledge translation has been developed by Mandy Archibald, assistant professor and interdisciplinary artist at the University of Manitoba and others.
