= National Art Education Association =

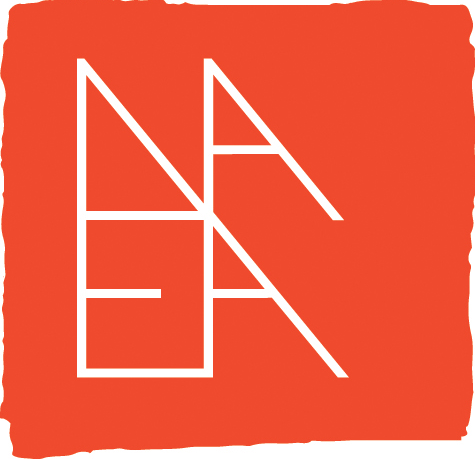
- Abbreviation: NAEA
- Formation: 1947; 79 years ago
- Type: Nonprofit
- Headquarters: 900 Prince Street
- Location: Alexandria, Virginia, United States
- Publication: Art Education; Studies in Art Education
- Subsidiaries: National Art Honor Society; National Junior Art Honor Society; National Art Education Association Women's Caucus
- Website: www.arteducators.org

The National Art Education Association (NAEA) is a non-profit professional association founded in 1947 in the United States, headquartered in Alexandria, Virginia. It is the world's largest professional art education association.

The NAEA's annual convention attracts thousands of art educators and offers art educators a chance to network, establish mentor relationships, and attend professional development events. The NAEA also gives awards for Art Educator of the Year at this convention.

Along with the Art & Creative Materials Institute, in 1969, the NAEA began sponsoring March as Youth Art Month. Since 1984, Youth Art Month has been run by the Council for Art Education, Inc., which consists of representatives of the NAEA and other art associations. The NAEA sponsors the National Art Honor Society and the National Junior Art Honor Society.

As an advocacy organization, the NAEA speaks out in favor of increased funding for art education, and opposing cuts to art funding. The NAEA has 21 interest groups, including the Seminar for Research in Art Education (SRAE, est. 1970), the Committee on Multiethnic Concerns (COMC, est. 1971), and the National Art Education Association Women's Caucus (WC, est. 1975).

The NAEA publishes two journals, Art Education and Studies in Art Education.
