= Kingsborough Houses-Kingsborough Extension =

Public housing development in Brooklyn, New York

- NYCHA property
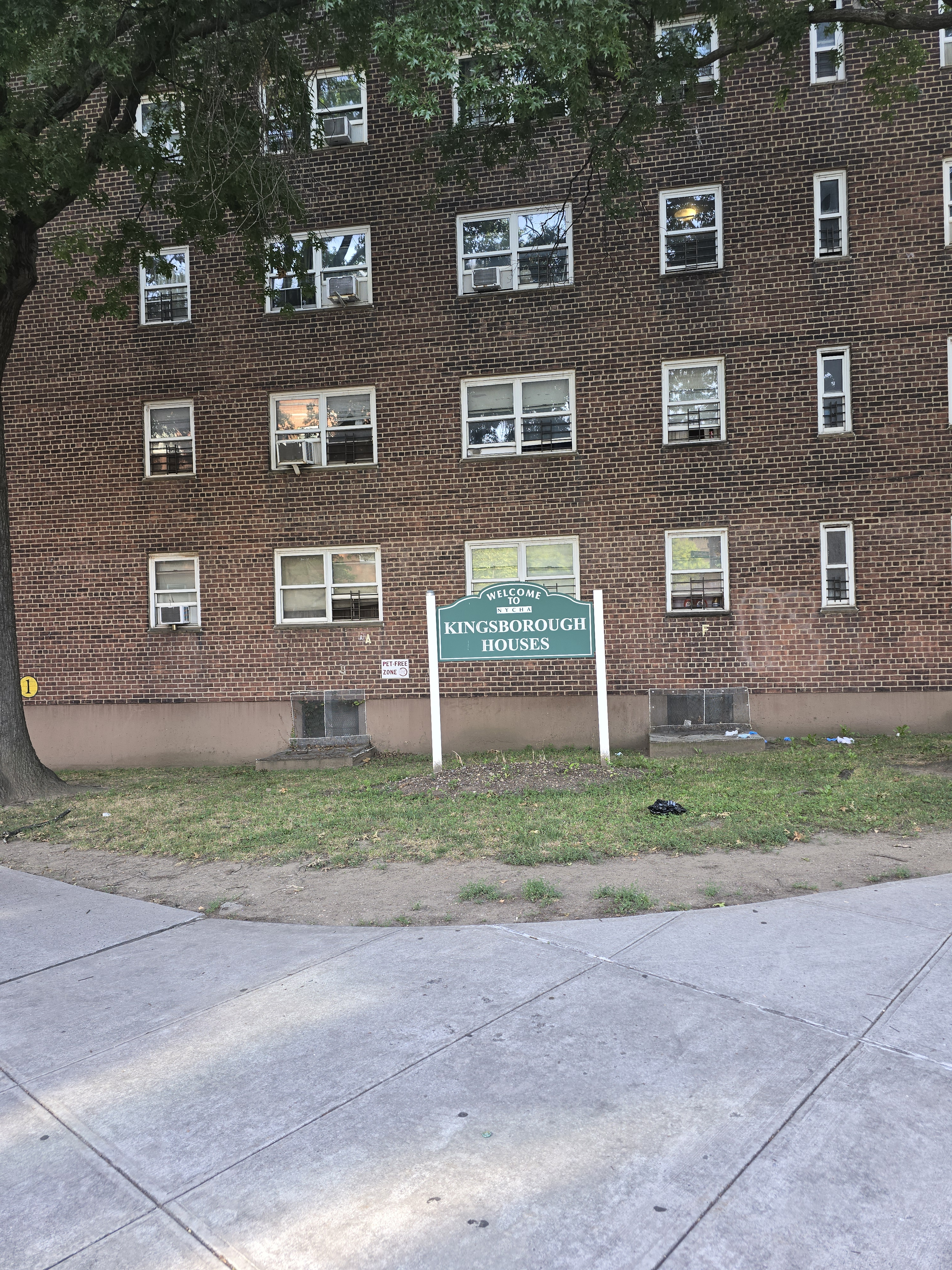
- Nickname: Kingsborough
- Interactive map of Kingsborough Houses-Kingsborough Extension
- Coordinates: 40.675120°N 73.924680°W
- Country: United States
- State: New York
- City: New York City
- Borough: Brooklyn
- ZIP codes: 11233
- Area codes: 718, 347, 929, and 917

Kingsborough Houses-Kingsborough Extension, also known as Kingsborough Houses, is a 15.97-acre housing project in the Crown Heights neighborhood of Brooklyn in New York City. It is bordered by Ralph and Rochester Avenues, and Pacific and Bergen Streets. The project consists of 16, six-story buildings with 1,148 apartment units. It is owned and managed by New York City Housing Authority.

== History ==
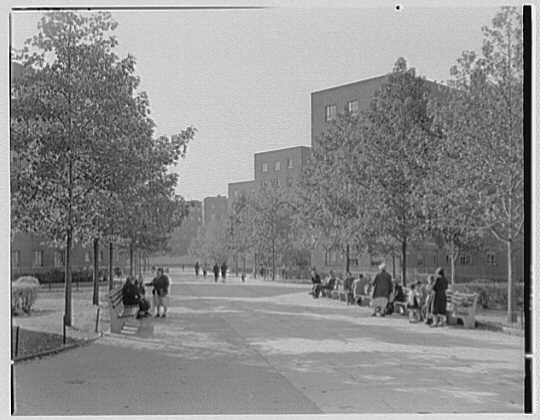
Kingsborough Houses in 1951

Construction of the Kingsborough Houses finished in 1941 and cost $5,160,000. Upon its completion, 36 employees worked on-site at the development, with nine in the office and remaining 27 employed on the grounds. The development opened with a majority of white residents, but by the late 1950s over two-thirds of residents were African-American.

The Kingsborough Extension was later completed in 1966 and is devoted to housing senior citizens.

== Artist and architect ==
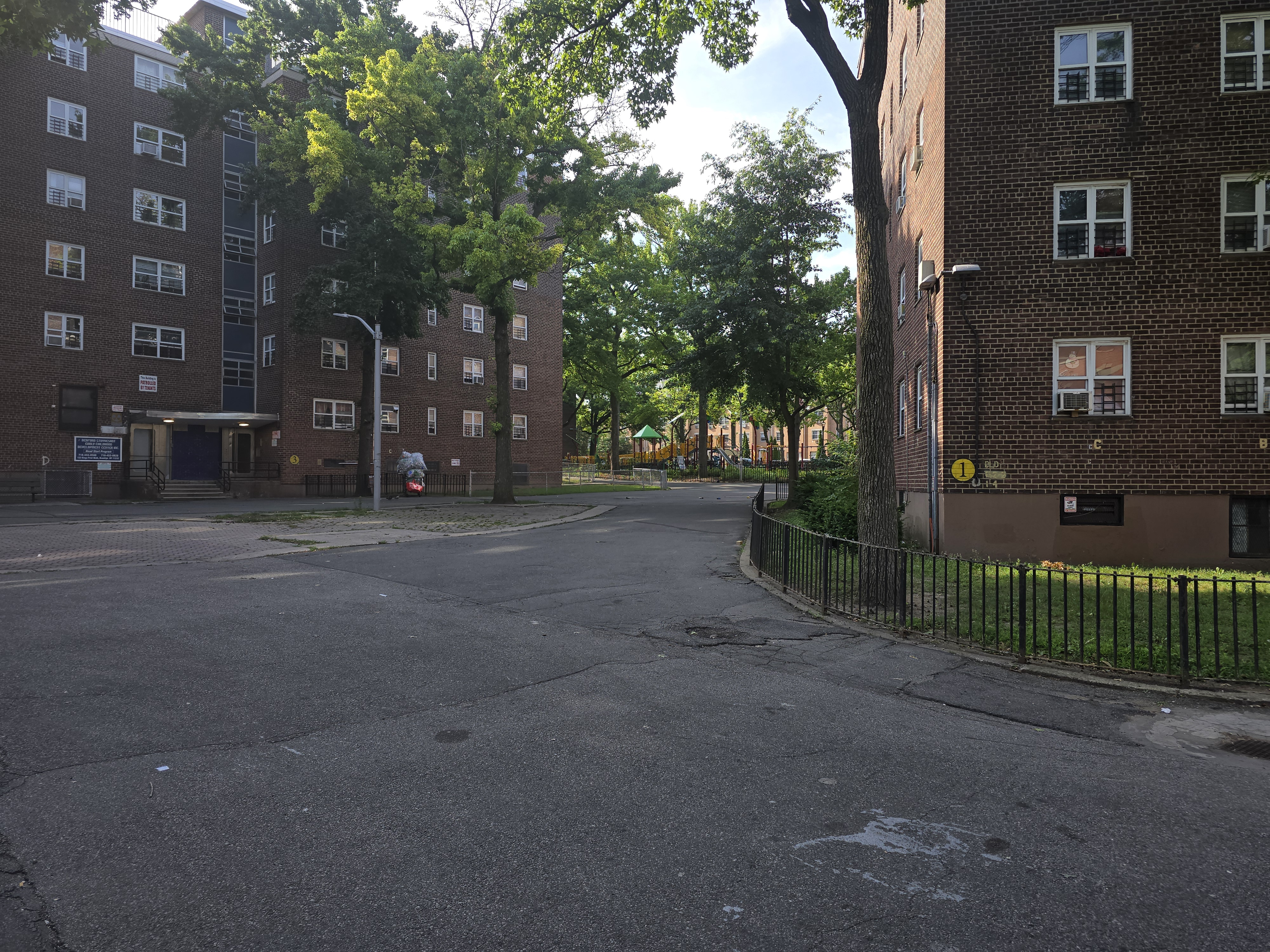
The grounds of Kingsborough Houses in 2025.

The cast-stone frieze, Green Pastures: The Walls of Jericho, created was created by Richmond Barthé through the Works Progress Administration (WPA) in 1938. Originally intended for the Harlem River Houses, an African-American public housing development, Barthé created the site-specific work for an amphitheater. The piece consists of scenes from the Old Testament through the eyes of an African-American child, inspired by the play The Green Pastures. After completion, the panels were placed in storage until 1941 when they were installed at the Kingsborough Houses, a majority white development. By 2018, the frieze was in disrepair with NYCHA unable to fund due to capital needs. As of 2021, the deferred maintenance and repair costs to restore the frieze are estimated to be nearly $1.8 million dollars. The frieze was fully restored in 2025.

Landscape architect Gilmore Clarke designed the development's grounds in a style reminiscent of city parks of the time.

The Kingsborough Extension was designed by architects Morris Ketchum Jr. & Associates.

== Notable residents ==
- Steve Bracey (1950-2006), NBA basketball player
