= Youth Art Month =

Logo of Youth Art Month.

Youth Art Month is a month of promoting art and art education in the United States. It is observed in March, with thousands of American schools participating, often with the involvement of local art museums and civic organizations.

== Background ==
Youth Art Month was founded by the Crayon, Water Color & Craft Institute, Inc., the predecessor of the Art & Creative Materials Institute, Inc. (ACMI), in cooperation with the National Art Education Association, in 1961 and was initially called Children's Art Month. Its goal was to "emphasize the value of participating in art for all children." It was renamed Youth Art Month in 1969, to include secondary school students. In 1984, ACMI created the Council for Art Education, Inc. (CFAE) to oversee the annual observation of Youth Art Month. As of 2009, CFAE consisted of representatives of: ACMI, the National Art Education Association, "The SHIP" (a group of manufacturers of art materials), and the General Federation of Women's Clubs. The Craft & Hobby Association is also involved in Youth Art Month.

== Activities ==
=== National events ===
The main nationwide component of Youth Art Month is a competition called School Flags Across America . . . Flying High. As part of the competition, each state Youth Art Month Chairperson selects a theme that is representative of that state and of the spirit of Youth Art Month, and students design flags around that theme. The winning design from each state is then made into an actual flag, and the 50 student-designed flags are then displayed throughout Washington, D.C., following an opening ceremony held the first week of March to commemorate the start of Youth Art Month. The winning students and their families are invited to attend this opening ceremony in Washington, D.C., and the flags are displayed throughout the city for March, and then displayed at the Youth Art Month booth at the annual convention of the National Art Education Association.

=== State and local events ===
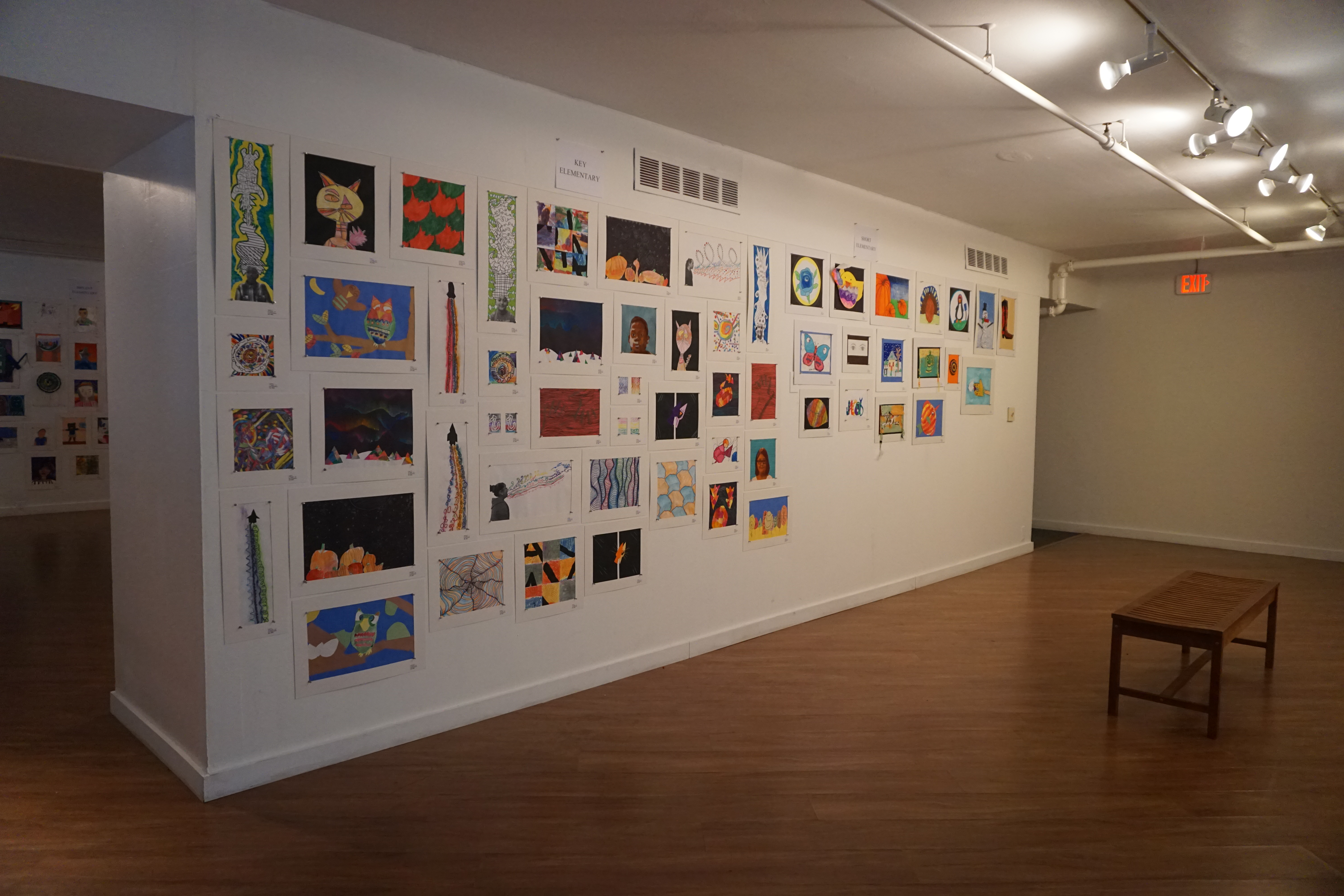
Youth Art Month exhibit at the Arlington Museum of Art in Arlington, Texas

Governors and mayors throughout the United States issue proclamations declaring March as Youth Art Month, and many United States Senators, Member of Congress, and state legislators take the opportunity to make public statements in favor of art education.

Observation of Youth Art Month is carried out by volunteers around the country, including art educators, parents, librarians, leaders of youth organizations, businesspeople, and students.

Activities depend on the efforts of local volunteers, and include:

- display of student art at art museums, libraries, and other places throughout the community;
- talks, forums, and discussions on art;
- partnerships with local newspapers, radio stations, and TV stations to raise the profile of youth art and art education in the community;
- local art competitions, often with winning student art displayed somewhere prominent in the community (e.g. at local bus stops);
- cross-promotions to raise awareness of other local charities or to beautify the community;
- special events, such as sidewalk chalk displays, ice sculpture carving, and craft workshops.
