= Harlem River Houses =

Public housing development in Manhattan, New York

- U.S. National Register of Historic Places
- New York State Register of Historic Places
- New York City Landmark
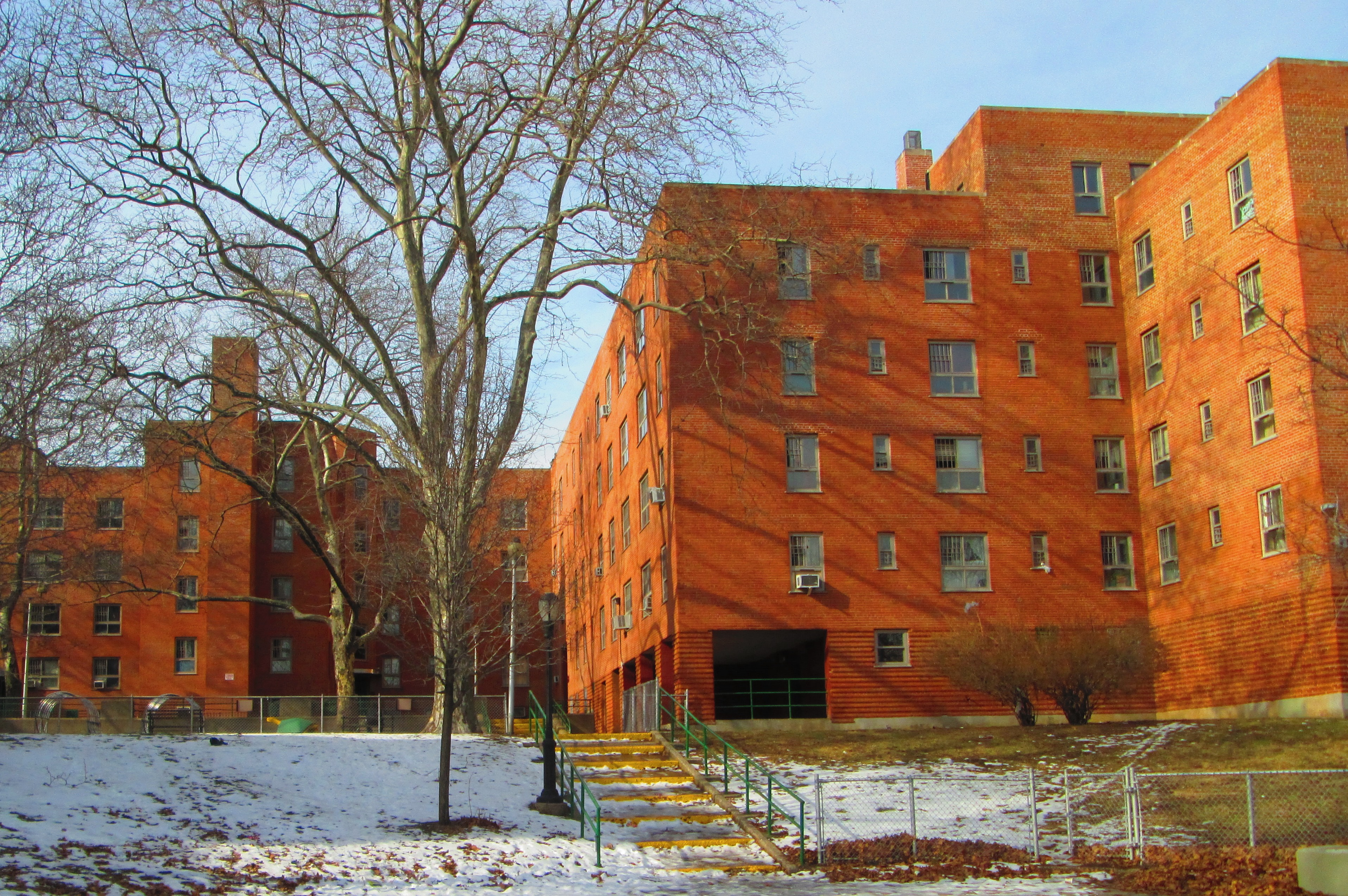
- Seen from Harlem River Drive walkway (2014)
- Location: West 151st to 153rd Sts., Macombs Pl. and Harlem River Dr. Manhattan, New York City
- Coordinates: 40°49′33″N 73°56′12″W
- Area: 9 acres (3.6 ha)
- Built: 1936-37
- Architects: Archibald Manning Brown (chief architect), et al.
- NRHP reference No.: 79001605
- NYCL No.: 0894

Significant dates
- Added to NRHP: December 18, 1979
- Designated NYSRHP: June 23, 1980
- Designated NYCL: September 23, 1975

The Harlem River Houses is a New York City Housing Authority public housing complex between 151st Street, 153rd Street, Macombs Place, and the Harlem River Drive in the Harlem neighborhood of Manhattan in New York City. The complex, which covers 9 acres (3.6 ha), was built in 1936-37 and opened in October 1937 – one of the first two housing projects in the city funded by the Federal government – with the goal of providing quality housing for working-class African Americans. It has 574 apartments.

The complex was designated a New York City Landmark in 1975 and was listed on the National Register of Historic Places in 1979. In 2014 the complex was designated a Special Planned Community Preservation District, a zoning category created in 1974 "to preserve and protect ... superior examples of town planning or large-scale development." The success of the project can be attributed to its formal, classically influenced design, to the project's focus on attracting a wide variety of tenants, not just the indigent, and to its "generous budget and high aspirations for quality."

Sometime in 2022, the development was converted into RAD PACT Section 8 Management in a Public-private partnership between NYCHA and with the following private companies; Settlement Housing Fund Inc, West Harlem Group Assistance, L+M Builders Group, and C&C Apartment Management LLC. Presbyterian Senior Services was added to their site as a social service provider for their residents.

== History ==
As originally planned, public housing in New York City was segregated. After the Harlem Riot of 1935, there was pressure to improve housing for African Americans, but no general attempts were made to desegregate public housing. The Harlem River Houses were one of two projects which, for the first time, used Federal funds to construct public housing in New York City as part of Franklin D. Roosevelt's "New Deal" social program. The project was built by the Housing Division of the Public Works Administration at the cost of $4.5 million, a site owned by the Rockefeller family, which demanded twice the amount which Federal land acquisition guidelines would normally allow to be paid. Eventually, community protests pushed the project ahead, and the property was taken by eminent domain at the price of $1 million.

The other project constructed at about the same time was the Williamsburg Houses in Brooklyn, intended for whites. The construction and opening of the two projects attracted national attention. When the project was completed, 11,000 people applied for the 574 available apartments. As of 1987, about 3 dozen of the tenants were part of the original group.

When it opened, the project had child care, health care and a public community room on site. Rent in 1937 was $21.00 a month, and by 1939 was between $19.38 and $31.42 per month. During the Reagan Administration, the rent was raised from 25% to 30% of a family's gross income.

== Architects ==
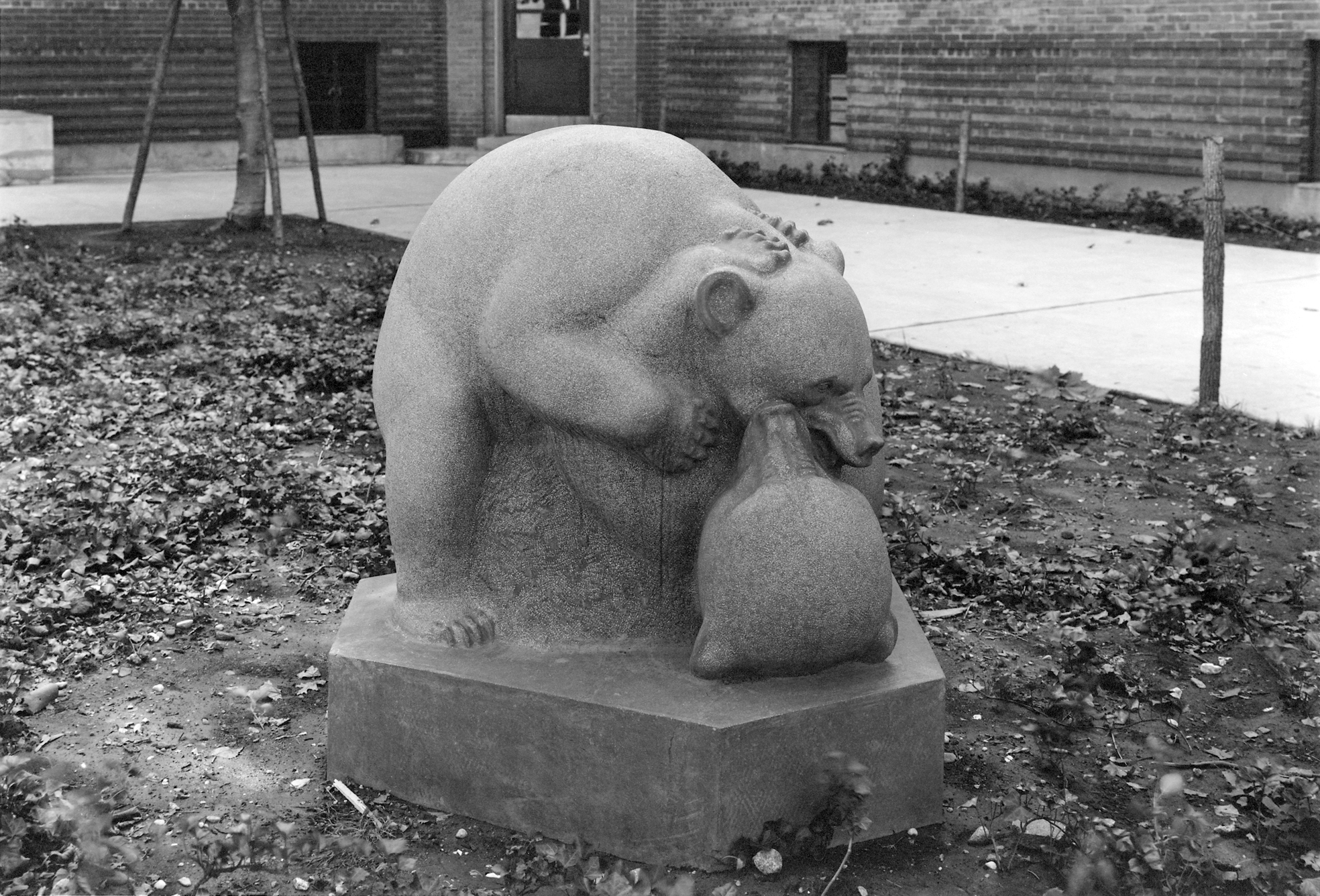
Bears Playing (1938), sculpture by Heinz Warneke for the Harlem River Houses

Archibald Manning Brown was the chief architect for the project. Other contributing architects included Will Rice Amon, Richard W. Buckley, Frank J. Forster, Charles F. Fuller, Horace Ginsbern, and John Louis Wilson Jr. one of the first African American architects to be registered in New York State. Historians believe that Ginsbern, who had previously worked on the design of garden apartments along the Grand Concourse in the Bronx, was responsible for the project's overall layout.

The landscape architects for the project were headed by Michael Rapuano.

The primary sculptor involved in the design of the Harlem River Houses was Heinz Warneke, assisted by T. Barbarossa, F. Steinberger. Richmond Barthé created the frieze Green Pastures: Walls of Jericho for the project, however they installed in 1941 at Kingsborough Houses, a mostly white project.

== Design ==
Each building in the complex is four or five stories tall and is set around landscaped open areas which include lawns, wide walkways, and recreation areas; around two-thirds of the project's land is open space. Those buildings with an additional story are built on a lower level, giving all buildings the same overall height. They are built from red brick, and have very little trim.

The project is divided into three groups of buildings, two of which are west of Adam Clayton Powell Jr. Boulevard (Seventh Avenue), and one of which lies east of the avenue and west of the Harlem River Drive. All lie between West 151st and 153rd Streets. The two western groups are each arranged around a large plaza, while the eastern group is more linear. The formal layout is "reminiscent of a European park."

The 9-acre Harlem River Houses are said to be the most successful public housing in New York City. The architects designed modern, spacious buildings which, according to architecture critic Lewis Mumford, provided:

"the equipment for decent living that every modern neighborhood needs: sunlight, air, safety, play space, meeting space, and living space. The families in the Harlem Houses have higher standards of housing, measured in tangible benefits, than most of those on Park Avenue."

Another contemporary critic said of the complex:

"The whole, in detailing, looks tired – as if the creative drive and the creator's pleasure, which had sailed so triumphantly through the period of general planning and design, had suddenly failed when it came to the last, completing touches. Harlem River Houses is so generally beautiful that one longs for it to be perfect. What might have been great architecture is merely - very good."

Artist Richmond Barthé's had a public commission from the New York City's Federal Art Project for an 80-foot bas-relief in cast stone, (1939), created for the embellishment of the Harlem River Houses complex, but upon completion, his work was installed at the Kingsborough Houses in Brooklyn.

== Notable residents ==
- Robert Parris Moses (1935–2021), civil rights activist originally with the Student Nonviolent Coordinating Committee in Mississippi and key player in Freedom Summer and voting rights advocacy. Originator and developer of the Algebra Project.
- Lemoine Deleaver Pierce (1934–2015), educator and mediator

== See also ==
- List of New York City Landmarks
- National Register of Historic Places listings in New York County, New York
- New York City Housing Authority
