= National Art Education Association Women's Caucus =

National Art Education Association Women's Caucus is an interest group of the professional art education organization, the National Art Education Association.

The National Art Education Association Women’s Caucus official name changed was recognized on November 18, 2023. The Women’s Caucus is now formally known as the Coalition for Feminisms in Art Education.

== Mission ==
"The coalition for feminisms in art education (CFAE) shall represent and work to advance art education as an advocate of equity for women and all people who encounter injustice. It shall also work to eliminate discriminatory gender and other stereotyping practices for individuals and groups and for the concerns of women art educators and artists." This mission statement has been voted on and ratified in 1978, 1995, and 2010; being last voted and ratified, by the majority of Women's Caucus members, on February 17, 2010.”

== History ==
The Women's Caucus became an official interest group of the National Art Education Association in 1975 under the leadership of art educator Judy Loeb as the first president of the group.

The group formed to address the inequities faced by “women and all people who encounter, injustice” including improving awareness of the work of women artists and women art educators. However, the membership of the Women's Caucus has always been open and inclusive of people of all genders.

The Women's Caucus held its first session at the 1975 NAEA convention in Miami, FL.

The Women's Caucus archives are housed at the Pennsylvania State University Libraries.

== Lobby Activism ==
The first Lobby Activism event was a meeting of 16 art educators in the hotel lobby of the National Convention held in New Orleans. Their discussions centered, what Karen Keifer-Boyd writes in the anthology, NAEA Women’s Caucus Lobby Activism: Feminism(s) + Art Education “derogatory visual stereotypes perpetuated in the 2008 primaries and president campaign advertisements."

== Awards ==
The Women's Caucus annually recognizes the contributions of outstanding art educators at the NAEA annual convention through five awards: the Kathy Connors Teaching Award, the Mary J. Rouse Award, the Carrie Nordlund pre-K-12 Feminist Pedagogy Award, the Maryl Fletcher de Jong Service Award, and the June King McFee Award.
