= Conference of Women in the Visual Arts =

Woman's conference

Conference of Women in the Visual Arts

The Conference of Women in the Visual Arts was an event held on April 20, 1972, through 22, 1972 at the Corcoran Gallery of Art in Washington DC. The conference was organized by Cynthia Bickley, Mary Beth Edelson, Barbara Frank, Enid Sanford, Susan Sollins, Josephine Withers, and Yvonne Wulff. The impetus behind the conference was anger over the complete lack of women represented at the Corcoran Biennial the previous year, 1971. The three day conference consisted of lectures and panels of women artists and art historians. It was attended by over 300 female artists, art historians, critics and museum curators.

Notable speakers and attendees included Liza Bear, Adelyn Dohme Breeskin, Judy Chicago, Elaine de Kooning, Helen Frankenthaler, Alice Neel, Cindy Nemser, Linda Nochlin, M. C. Richards, Linda Frommer, Enid Sanford, Miriam Schapiro, and June Wayne.

It was one of the first conferences to focus on the place of women in the visual arts, encouraging participation and consciousness-raising.
