= Art & Creative Materials Institute =

International organization which certificates the safety of art materials

The Art & Creative Materials Institute is an international organization which certificates the safety of art materials, primarily for children. It conducts toxicology tests in conjunction with Duke University.

== About ==
ACMI was initially known as the Crayon, Water Color & Craft Institute, Inc. It was renamed the Art & Craft Materials Institute in 1982. It adopted its current name in the late 2000s. ACMI was founded in 1936 and is currently headquartered in Hingham, Massachusetts.

== Council ==
ACMI was the founding member of the Council for Art Education, Inc. (CFAE), which promotes art education across the US. CFAE holds March as Youth Art Month and encourages teachers to involve students in their art month flag program. They continue to be CFAE's largest supporter today.
