= Council for Art Education, Inc. =

- Headquarters: Hanson, Massachusetts
- Website: councilforarteducation.org

The Council for Art Education, Inc. (CFAE) is an organization created by the Art & Creative Materials Institute (ACMI) in 1984 to promote March as Youth Art Month, which was designed to promote art education. As of 2009, CFAE consists of representatives from ACMI, the National Art Education Association, "The SHIP" (a group of manufacturers of art materials), and the General Federation of Women's Clubs. The organization sponsors an annual competition called "School Flag Across the U.S....Flying High", where students are encouraged to design their own flags, and the winning flag is flown in Washington, D.C. throughout Youth Art Month.
