= Deborah Smith-Shank =

American artist and educator

Deborah Smith-Shank (in some places written as Deborah Smith-~~Shank~~) is from Middleburg Heights, Ohio. She has been a professor at The Ohio State University since 2010. She is a former chair of the Department of Arts Administration, Education and Policy from 2012 to 2016. As of 2011, she has had associate faculty status in the Department of Women's, Gender, & Sexuality Studies. She is an emeritus professor of art at Northern Illinois University. From 2004 to 2010 she was head of the Art Education Division at Northern Illinois University. While there, she was also a professor of art and education from 2003 to 2010. From 2007 to 2011 she was the faculty associate of LGBT studies, and the faculty associate of women's studies from 1994 to 2007. Smith-Shank was the NAEA Women's Caucus past president from 1998 to 2000 with Elizabeth Ament. She has served on the executive board of InSEA of over 10 years, and was the president of the Semiotic Society of America in 2017. Smith-Shank and Karen Keifer-Boyd co-edited and founded Visual Culture & Gender, an international multimedia juried journal. Smith-Shank is the associate editor of International Journal of Semiotics and Visual Rhetoric.

Deborah Smith-Shank primarily works with mixed media, and was trained as a painter. She received her B.S. in art education in 1972, and an M.S. in art education in 1976 from Indiana University. Also in 1976, she was granted the Life Teaching license by the State of Indiana. She received her Ph.D. in art education from Indiana University in 1992. Smith-Shank wrote Evaluation in Art Education with Jerome J. Hausman in 1994. Later, she wrote Semiotics and Visual Culture: Sights, Signs, and Significance in 2004.
