= William Artis =

African-American sculptor

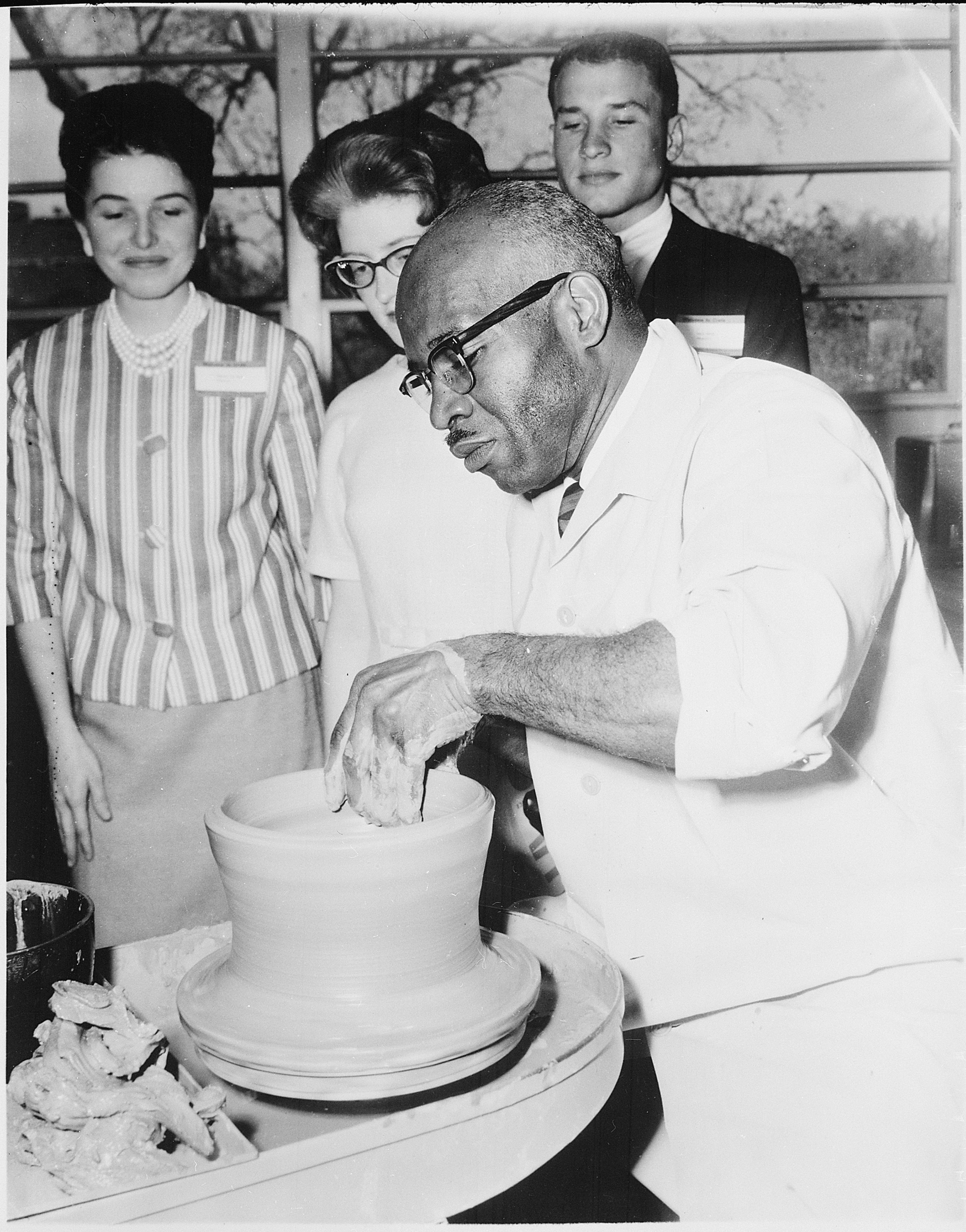
- William Artis at work
- Born: February 2, 1914; Washington, North Carolina, US
- Died: April 3, 1977 (aged 63)
- Education: Art Students League of New York, Syracuse University
- Known for: Sculptor

William Ellisworth Artis (February 2, 1914 – April 3, 1977) was an African American sculptor active from the Harlem Renaissance until his death. His favorite medium was clay for its ability to provide a broad range of expression. He dabbled in oil painting and, during the latter part of his life, began to focus on potting. His art style focused on representations of Black features and "figurative tradition".

== Early life ==
Artis was born in Washington, North Carolina to Elizabeth Davis and Thomas Midgett. He and his older half-brother, Warren Allen Davis, were raised on a farm by their great grandmother, Liza Lane. He became interested in pottery in part due to playing with local red clay deposits. One day during Boy Scouts, he sculpted a hand from local clay and brought it to school the next day, impressing his class.

In 1927, he moved to Harlem, New York largely due to the Great Migration. He lived with his mother, brother, stepfather George Artis, and grandmother Elva Lane. Unlike his brother, he claimed his stepfather’s surname.

== Education and career ==
Artis graduated from Frederick Douglass Junior High School 139 in 1932 and from Haaren High School in 1936, majoring in the arts. He was a pupil of Augusta Savage as a teenager. In high school, he presented in the Harmon Foundation 1933 exhibition with Head of a Girl. This earned him the $100 John Hope prize, a mention in Time magazine, and a full-ride scholarship for a year at Art Student League. He studied under Robert Laurent during that time. After, Audrey McMahon hired him for the College Art Association to teach crafts and paint communal spaces. He was featured in the 1930s film, A Study of Negro Artists, along with Savage and other artists associated with the Harlem Renaissance. He taught at the Harlem YMCA after finishing high school, before joining with Works Progress Administration artist projects, such as with Harmon Foundation and Rosenwald Fund. He was also under the tutelage of Roberta Laber from 1936 to 1938, and Maude Robinson in 1938. Between 1933 to 1940, he was involved in over 14 exhibitions.

From the late 1930s until 1941, he lived with Langston Hughes and two others. In the summers of 1940, ‘46, and ‘47, Artis pursued education as a special student and eventual instructor at New York State College of Ceramics at Alfred University.

He closed his studio near Apollo Theatre upon being drafted into World War II. After being discharged from his U.S. army service in Europe, he resumed his art. In 1945, Artis, Romare Bearden, and Selma Burke were in the landmark Albany Institute of History and Art exhibit. Over the next decade, they helped advance Black representation in national exhibits and galleries. In 1946, he received a Harmon Foundation grant to teach a four-day ceramics class at twenty Philadelphia schools.

Soon after, he pursued higher education at Syracuse University. Artis earned a Bachelor in Fine Arts in 1950. A year later, he graduated with a Master in Fine Arts. He studied under Ivan Meštrović. He taught at Holy Rosary School at Pine Ridge Reservation in North Dakota because of his interest in Sioux culture, where he taught pottery production for two years. In 1954, he was hired by Bill Boehle as a ceramic associate professor at Nebraska State Teachers College. Artis is cited as a popular professor for his efforts in creatively pushing his students and uncovering their strengths. In 1959, he defended a modern mural on campus as environmental symbolism, helping it remain for 25 years after controversy.

He eventually sought new creative career endeavors, becoming an art associate professor at Mankato State College from 1966 until 1975, stopping due to ill health. His goal was to study local clay deposits and share with the local Native American tribes to highlight a resource for economic development.

He received many accolades during his decades long artistic career. His work was found in schools such as Atlanta University, Fisk University, Hampton University, and Chadron State College along with museums like Whitney Museum of American Art, North Carolina Museum of Art, Smithsonian Institution, and Joslyn Art Museum. Many of his pieces are still in private collections and copyrighted. In the 1950s and ‘60s, he won Atlanta’s National Art Exhibition multiple times for his African American terra cotta sculptures.

== Personal life ==
From 1941 to 1945, Artis served in the Army as staff sergeant of the 366th Infantry Regiment. During his tour in Bari, Italy, his sculpture of two Italian children won the $100 prize in the American Red Cross Club’s art exhibition against fellow artist soldiers. Other notable works during his service include portraits of his infantry officers.

He was described as a short and reserved man with a great sense of humor, generosity, and knowledgeability.

He commonly wore a white shirt, tie, and smock when working.

His ancestors were freed Black people and Blackfoot Natives.

Artis never married or learned to drive.

A core family value taught by Artis was the importance of education.

He commonly signed his work but rarely dated the pieces.

He belonged to the American Ceramic Society, New York Society of Craftsmen, and New York Society of Ceramic Art.

== Death and legacy ==
Artis died in North Port, New York on April 3, 1977. It is believed he was battling a brain tumor.

He was considered a prominent Black sculptor and ceramist whose art was displayed nationally. Chadron State College has an extensive inventory of his work, with at least 25 donated and saved pieces, correspondences, and photos. There, his works are exampled in courses, displayed on campus, and loaned to exhibitions.

He is said to have impacted many people's lives due to his artistic guidance.

Posthumously, he was awarded an Honorary Doctor of Fine Arts from North Carolina Central University, which was given to his brother. Since 2005–2006, a scholarship at Chadron State College was set up in his name for visual arts majors. Artis was reported to be featured in at least twenty books, and commonly appears in Black art history.

== Gallery ==
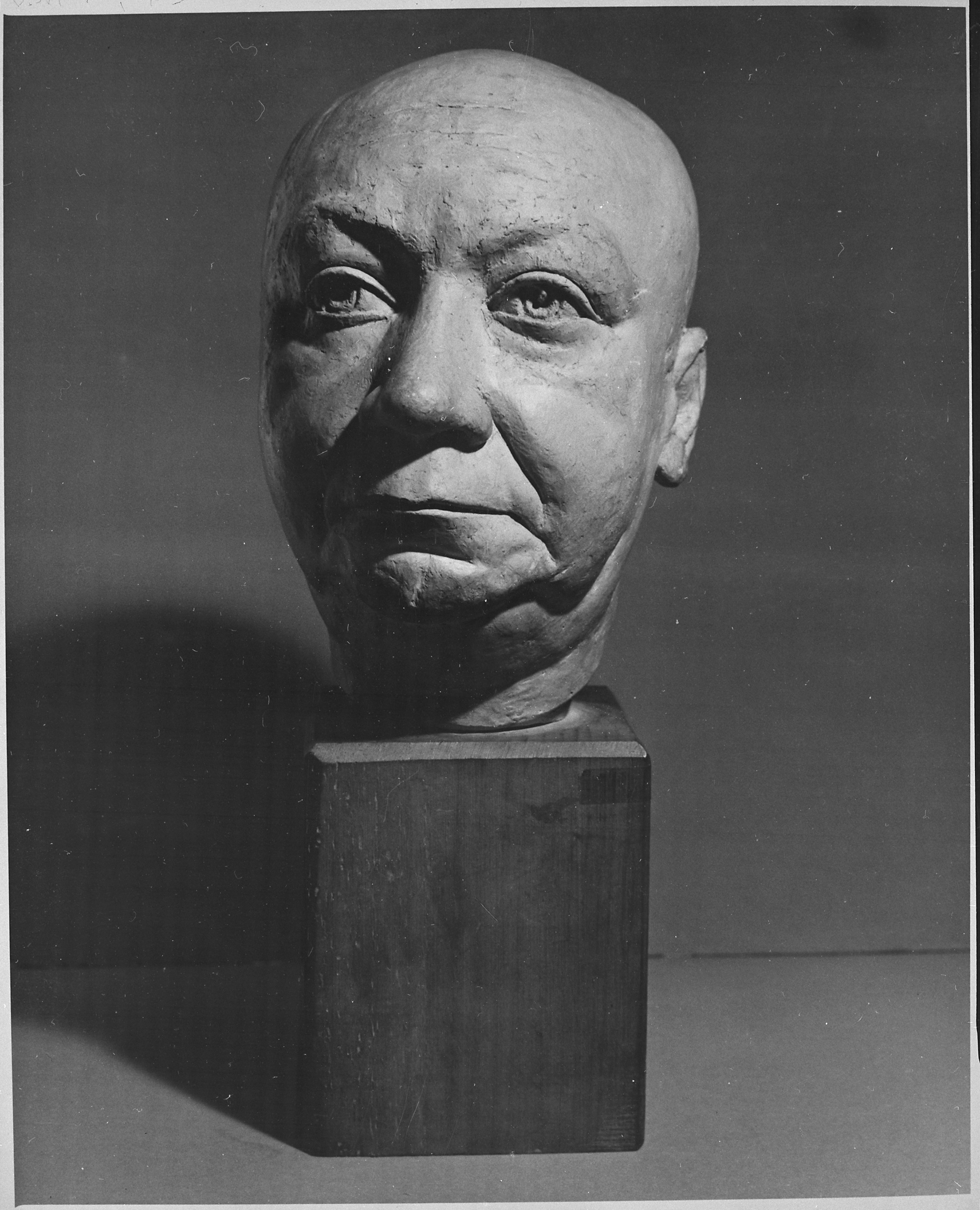
Portrait of Louis T. Wright

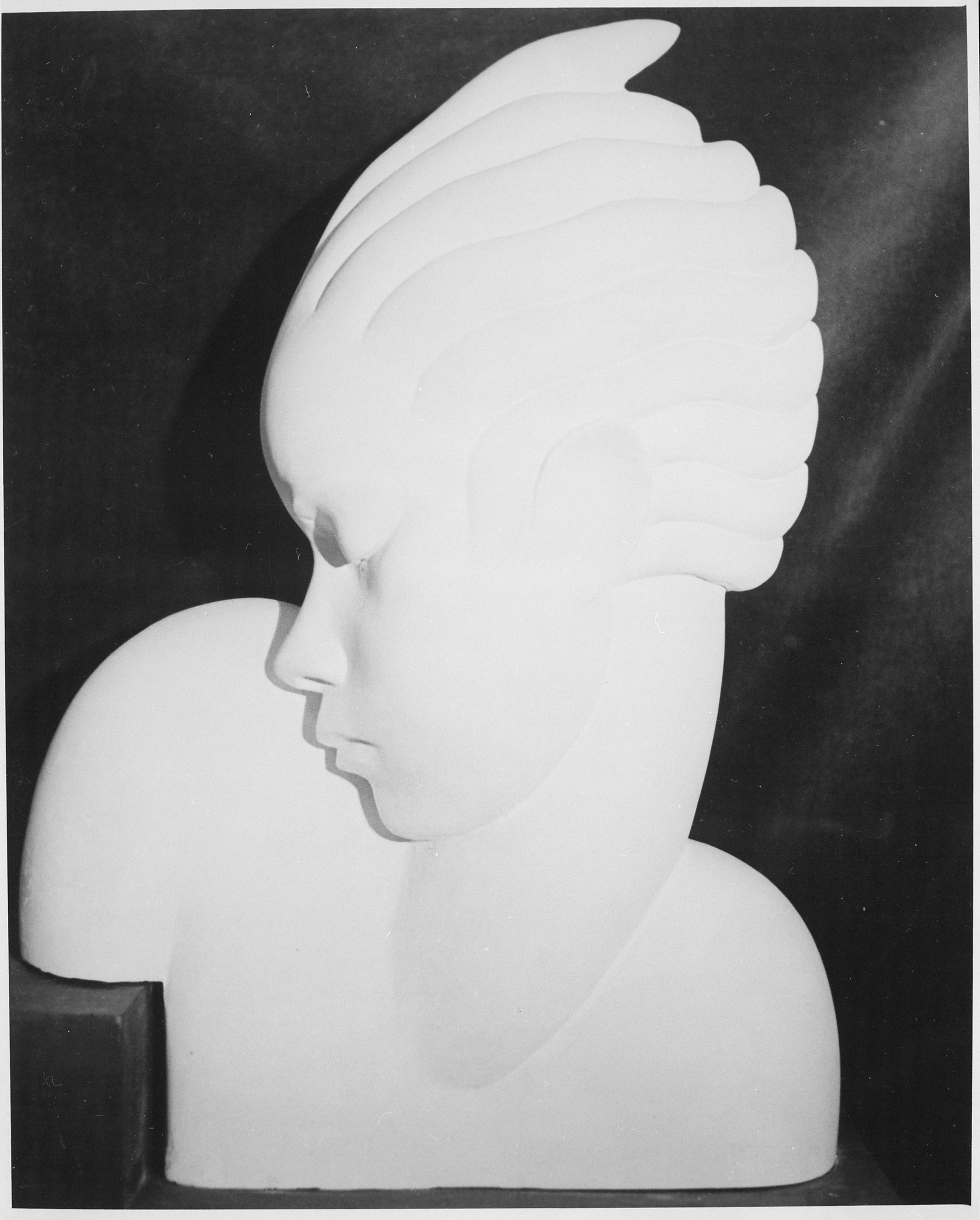
Decorative Head

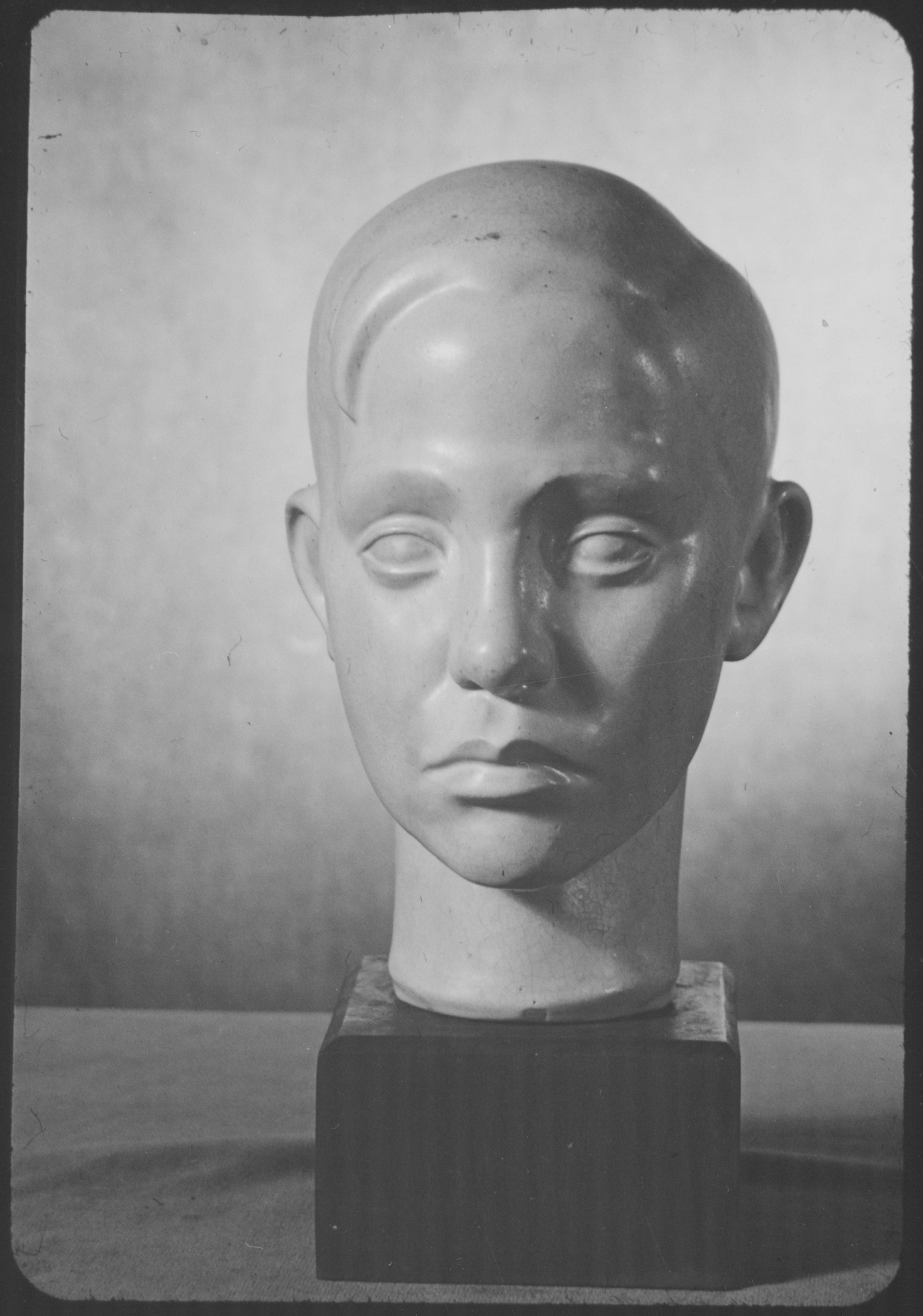
Head in terracotta
