= Georgette Seabrooke =

American painter

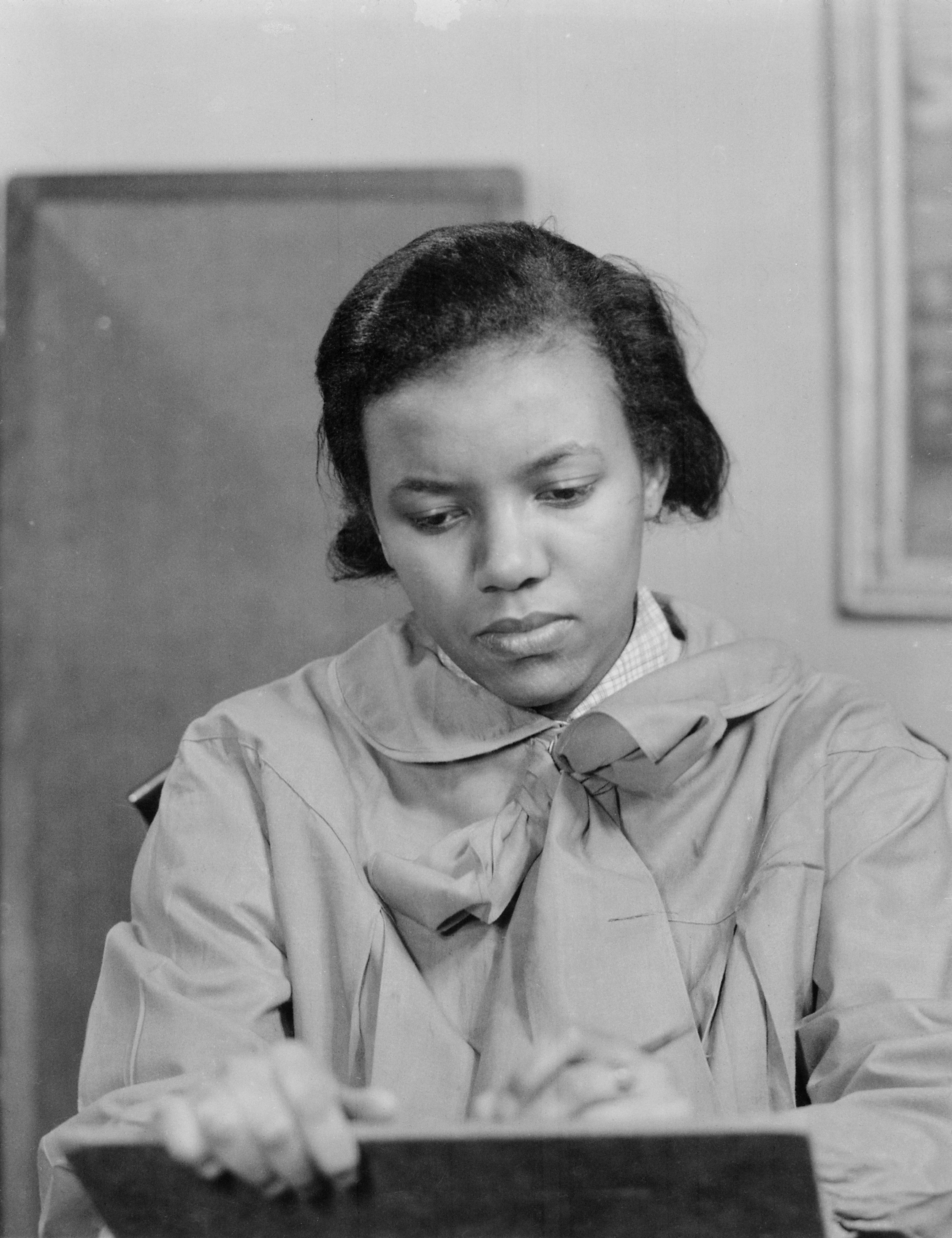
- Seabrooke, 1939
- Born: August 2, 1916; Charleston, South Carolina
- Died: December 27, 2011 (aged 95); Palm Coast, Florida
- Known for: painting (mixed media), art therapy
- Notable work: Recreation in Harlem

Georgette Seabrooke (aka Georgette Seabrooke Powell; August 2, 1916 – December 27, 2011), was an American muralist, artist, illustrator, art therapist, non-profit chief executive and educator. She is best known for her 1936 mural, Recreation in Harlem at Harlem Hospital in New York City, which was restored and put on public display in 2012 after being hidden from view for many years.

== Biography ==
Early life and education

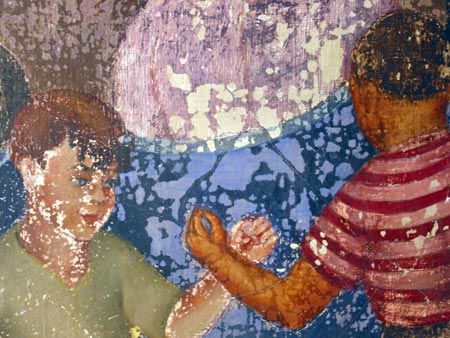
'Recreation in Harlem': boys

Seabrooke was born in Charleston, South Carolina, the only child of George and Anna Seabrooke. Her and her father were the descendants of Robert Seabrook, an early South Carolina planter and politician. Her family moved to New York City in 1920. George, a restaurant and hotel owner, died when Georgette was a young child. Her mother was a domestic housekeeper, and Georgette worked with her while quite young. Georgette did well in school and graduated from Washington Irving High School. She also studied with James Lesesne Wells at the Harlem Art Workshop, and with Gwendolyn B. Bennett at the Harlem Community Art Center.

In 1933, at the age of 17, she was admitted to the prestigious Cooper Union School of Art in New York, where in 1935 she received the school's Silver Medal, its highest honor, for a painting entitled "Church Scene," which "depicts a realism of religious fervor prevalent in many churches at that time." The painting, along with her other works, are inspired by Seabrooke's Afro-American heritage. Since childhood, Seabrooke had been painting and drawing images of "Black American lifestyles and African symbolism" and this had influenced her art "which ranges from social realism to decorative design." Cooper Union denied Seabrooke her diploma in 1937 for what it said at the time was incomplete work, but six decades later, in 1997, it invited Seabrooke back to its campus to honor her achievements. In 2008 Cooper Union presented Seabrooke with a lifetime achievement award, and the school now considers her a member of its class of 1937.

Recreation in Harlem and the WPA

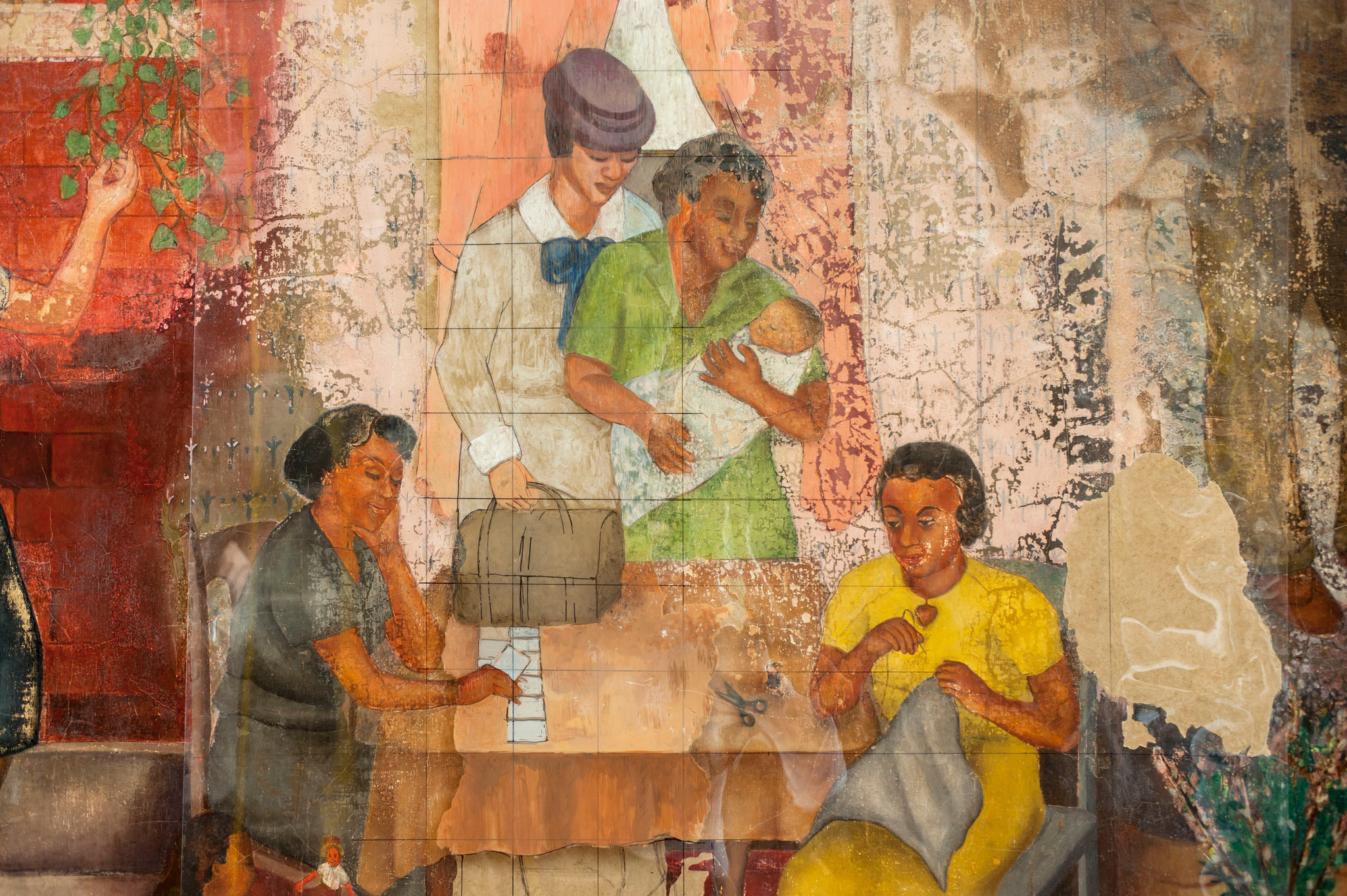
'Recreation in Harlem': women and baby

While studying at Cooper Union, Seabrooke was chosen by the Federal Art Project of the Works Progress Administration (WPA) as one of four "master artists" to paint murals at Harlem Hospital. She was the youngest artist so chosen and the only female. The mural she painted, Recreation in Harlem, is nearly 20 feet long and depicts daily life in Harlem in the 1930s, including women chatting through a window and children performing in a choir. The hospital's management was not pleased with her depiction of an all-black Harlem community as they did not want to be known as a "Negro hospital." Seabrooke added eight white characters to the mural, but obscured their race in some cases and turned their face from the viewer in others. (This last piece of information is not verified on the site and conflicts with information elsewhere.) Seabrooke also received a WPA commission to paint a mural at Queens General Hospital, now known as Queens Hospital Center, in Jamaica, Queens, New York.

In 2012, after being hidden from public view for many years and after surviving damage from a fire and being painted over, Recreation in Harlem and the other murals at Harlem Hospital were restored and placed on public view in the hospital's new Mural Pavilion.

Later years and legacy

Seabrooke married Dr. George Wesley Powell in 1939. They remained married until 1959 and had three children. During this period she illustrated calendars and magazines, and she studied theater design at Fordham University.

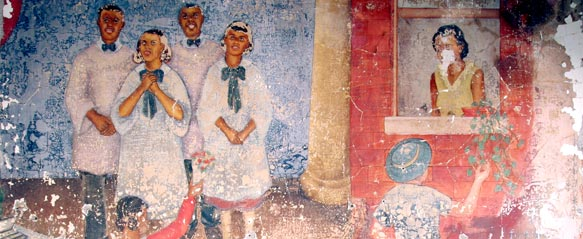
'Recreation in Harlem' detail

Seabrooke moved to Washington, D.C., in 1959. In 1970, she founded Operation Heritage Art Center, now known as Tomorrow's World Art Center. In 1972 she became a registered art therapist, and the following year earned her Bachelor of Fine Arts from Howard University. She was very active in combining art with mental health therapy, teaching at Tomorrow's World Art Center, and at a series of events in Malcolm X Park known as "Art in the Park". During the 1970s and 1980s, a time when Washington had a growing homeless population, Seabrooke painted a series of portraits of homeless men and women which emphasized their plight but also imbued them with humanity. Speaking about her stylistic tendencies, Seabrooke said, "As a people person... I enjoy drawing portraits and prefer charcoal and pastels for the sculptural quality of form, line, and texture." In 1977, Seabrooke traveled to Lagos, Nigeria to represent the United States at the Second World Black and African Festival of Arts and Culture (FESTAC).

Near the end of her life, Seabrooke moved to Palm Coast, Florida. Though she became too ill to continue making art, she remained involved in art therapy and art fundraising until her death, due to cancer, on December 27, 2011. Seabrooke's work appeared in 72 major exhibitions between 1933 and 2003 in the United States, Senegal, Venezuela, and Nigeria. Her works hang in distinguished collections around the United States.

== Works ==
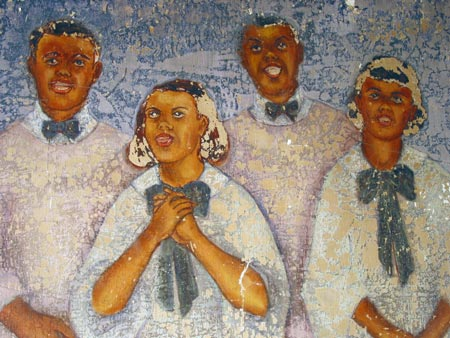
'Recreation in Harlem': choir

- Recreation in Harlem – Harlem Hospital Center – New York City, New York
- Grandmother's Birthday – Johnson Publishing Company – Chicago, Illinois
- Hampton Institute – Hampton, Virginia
- New York Public Library – New York City, New York
- Anacostia Museum – Washington D.C.
- Library of Congress – Washington D.C.
- Baltimore Museum of Art – Baltimore, Maryland
- Chicago Public Library – Chicago, Illinois
- Center for African American History and Culture – Washington D.C.

== Awards and honors ==
- 1935: Cooper Union School of Fine Arts – Silver medal for painting
- 2001: Washington D.C. Commission on the Arts
- 2002: D.C. Hall of Fame Society – Legacy Award
- 2005: Duke Ellington School of Arts
- 2008: Art Therapy Pioneer Award – American Art Therapy Association
- 1979: Outstanding Service and Dedication to the Community (plaque) – Neighborhood Planning Council #5, New York
- 1978: Certificate Award for Outstanding Contribution to the Life and Culture of the Black Community, "Salute to Black Women" – Institute for Urban Affairs and Research – Howard University
- 1978: Jas. D. Parks Special Award (certificate) – Community Service – National Conference of Artists
- 1977: National Achievement Certificate Award, D.C. Chapter – National Conference of Artists
- 1977: Outstanding Service Award (certificate) – D.C. Art Association
- 1976: Second Prize Painting Award – American Art League
- 1976, 1977, 1978: Featured in "Who's Who Among Black Americans"
- 1974: Quality Performance Award – Mental Health Program, D.C. Department of Recreation
- 1972: Second Prize Painting Award – Art Students League, New York, N.Y.
- 1967: First Prize Painting Award – American Art League
- 1964: Outstanding Performance Award – D.C. General Hospital (acute psychiatry)
- 1939: First Prize Painting Award – Dillard University, New Orleans, La.
- 1935: First Prize Painting, Silver Medal, Cooper Union Art School, N.Y.C.
- 1932: Cover Portrait, Opportunity Magazine, N.Y.C.

== Exhibits ==
- 1993: "Radiance and Reality" (one woman show) – Children's National Medical Center in Washington, D.C.
- 1995: "Art Changes Things" – Smithsonian Institution - Anacostia Museum

== See also ==
- List of Federal Art Project artists
