= Richmond Barthé =

African-American sculptor (1901–1989)

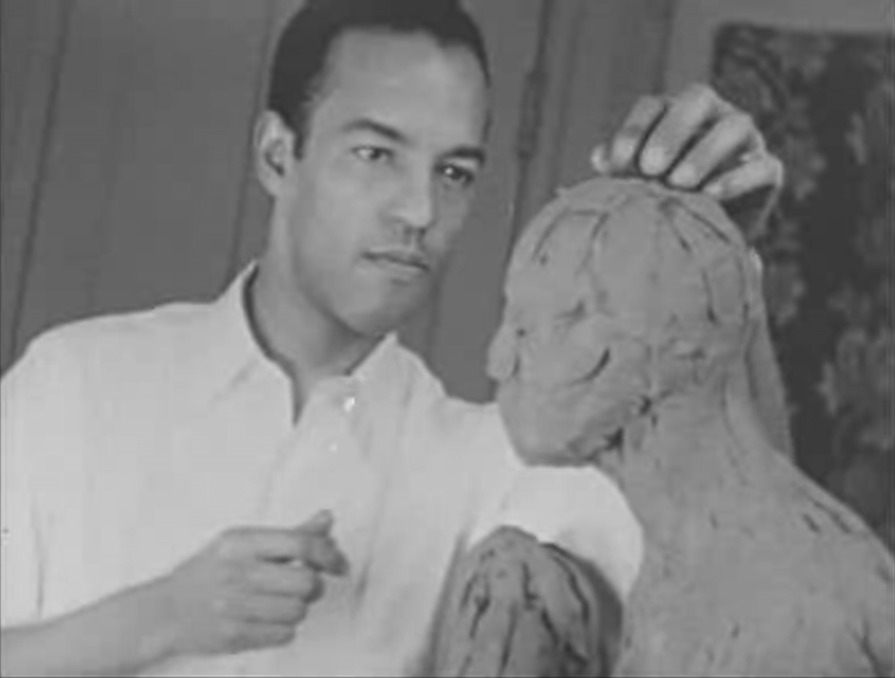
- Capture taken from the silent movie A Study of Negro Artists, filmed by Jules V. D. Bucher in 1935
- Born: January 28, 1901; Bay St. Louis, Mississippi, U.S.
- Died: March 5, 1989 (aged 88); Pasadena, California, U.S.
- Education: Art Institute of Chicago
- Known for: Sculpture
- Movement: Harlem Renaissance

James Richmond Barthé, also known as Richmond Barthé (January 28, 1901 – March 5, 1989) was an African-American sculptor associated with the Harlem Renaissance. Barthé is best known for his portrayal of black subjects. The focus of his artistic work was portraying the diversity and spirituality of man. Barthé once said: "All my life I have been interested in trying to capture the spiritual quality I see and feel in people, and I feel that the human figure as God made it, is the best means of expressing this spirit in man."

== Early life ==
James Richmond Barthé was born in Bay St. Louis, Mississippi, to Richmond Barthé and Marie Clementine Robateau. Barthé's father died at the age of 22, when he was only a few months old, leaving his mother to raise him alone. She worked as a dressmaker and before Barthé began elementary school she remarried to William Franklin, with whom she eventually had five additional children.

Barthé showed a passion and skill for drawing from an early age. His mother was, in many ways, instrumental in his decision to pursue art as a vocation. Barthé once said: "When I was crawling on the floor, my mother gave me paper and pencil to play with. It kept me quiet while she did her errands. At six years old I started painting. A lady my mother sewed for gave me a set of watercolors. By that time, I could draw very well."

Barthé continued making drawings throughout his childhood and adolescence, under the encouragement of his teachers. His fourth grade teacher, Inez Labat, from the Bay St. Louis Public School, influenced his aesthetic development by encouraging his artistic growth. When he was only twelve years old, Barthé exhibited his work at the Bay St. Louis County Fair.

However, young Barthé was beset with health problems, and after an attack of typhoid fever at the age of 14, he withdrew from school. Following this, he worked as a houseboy and handyman, but still spent his free time drawing. A wealthy family, the Ponds, who spent summers at Bay St. Louis, invited Barthé to work for them as a houseboy in New Orleans, Louisiana. Through his employment with the Ponds, Barthé broadened his cultural horizons and knowledge of art, and was introduced to Lyle Saxon, a local writer for the Times Picayune. Saxon was fighting against the racist system of school segregation, and tried unsuccessfully to get Barthé registered in an art school in New Orleans.

In 1924, Barthé donated his first oil painting to a local Catholic church to be auctioned at a fundraiser. Impressed by his talent, Fr Harry F. Kane, SSJ encouraged Barthé to pursue his artistic career and raised money for him to undertake studies in fine art. At the age of 23, with less than a high-school education and no formal training in art, Barthé applied to the Pennsylvania Academy of Fine Arts and the Art Institute of Chicago, and was accepted by the latter.

== Chicago ==
During the next four years, Barthé followed a curriculum structured for majors in painting. During this time he boarded with his aunt Rose and made a living working different jobs. His work caught the attention of Charles Maceo Thompson, a patron of the arts and supporter of many talented young black artists. Barthé was a flattering portrait painter, and Thompson helped him to secure many lucrative commissions from the Chicago's affluent black citizens.

At the Art Institute of Chicago, Barthé's formal artistic instruction in sculpture took place in anatomy class with professor of anatomy and German artist Charles Schroeder. Students practiced modeling in clay to gain a better understanding of the three-dimensional form. This experience proved to be, according to Barthé, a turning point in his career, shifting his attention away from painting and toward sculpture.

Barthé had his debut as a professional sculptor at The Negro in Art Week exhibition in 1927 while still a student of painting at the Art Institute of Chicago. He also exhibited in the April 1928 annual exhibition of the Chicago Art League. The critical acclaim allowed Barthé to enjoy numerous important commissions such as the busts of Henry O. Tanner (1928) and Toussaint L'Ouverture (1928). Although he was still in his late 20s, within a short time he won recognition, primarily through his sculptures, for making significant contributions to modern African-American art. By 1929, the essentials of his artistic education complete, Barthé decided to leave Chicago and head for New York City.

== New York City ==
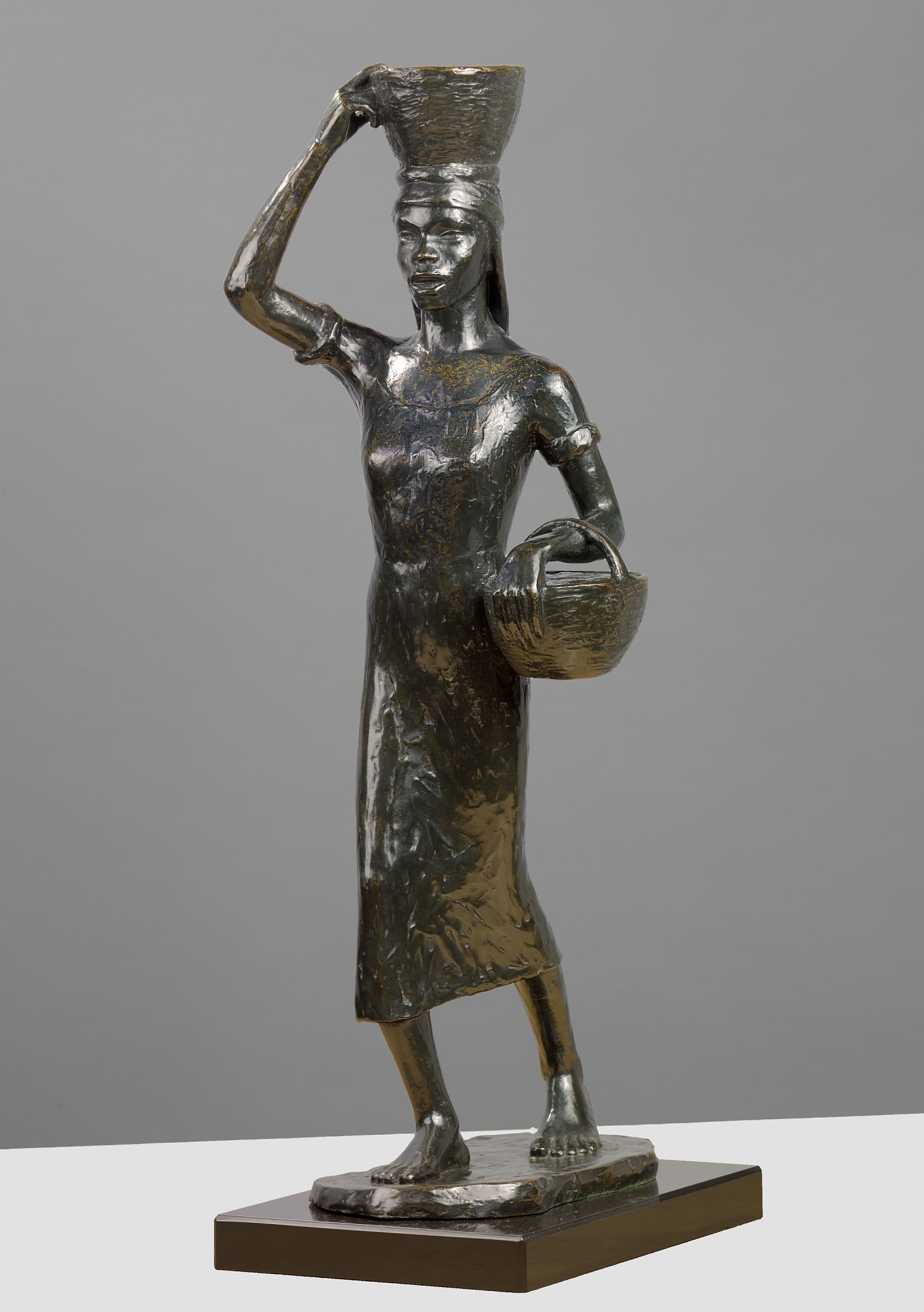
Blackberry Woman, cast 1932

While many young artists found it very difficult to earn a living from their art during the Great Depression, the 1930s were Richmond Barthé's most prolific years. The shift from the Art Institute of Chicago to New York City, where he moved following graduation, exposed Barthé to new experiences as he arrived in the city during the peak of the Harlem Renaissance. He established his studio in Harlem in 1930 after winning the Julius Rosenwald Fund fellowship at his first solo exhibition at the Women's City Club in Chicago. However, in 1931, he moved his studio in Harlem to Greenwich Village. Barthé once said: "I live downtown because it is much more convenient for my contacts from whom it is possible for me to make a living." He understood the importance of public relations and keeping abreast of collectors' interests.

Barthé mingled with the bohemian circles of downtown Manhattan. Initially unable to afford live models, he sought and found inspiration from on-stage performers. Living downtown provided him the opportunity to socialize not only among collectors but also among artists, dance performers, and actors. His remarkable visual memory permitted him to work without models, producing numerous representations of the human body in movement. During this time, he completed works such as Black Narcissus (1929), The Blackberry Woman (1930), Drum Major (1928), The Breakaway (1929), busts of Alain Locke (1928), bust of A’leila Walker (1928), The Deviled Crab-Man (1929), Rose McClendon (1932), Féral Benga (1935), and Sir John Gielgud as Hamlet (1935).

In October 1933, a major body of Barthé's work inaugurated the Caz Delbo Galleries at the Rockefeller Center in New York City. The same year, his works were exhibited at Chicago World's Fair in 1933. In summer 1934, Barthé went on a tour to Paris with Reverend Edward F. Murphy, a friend of Reverend Kane from New Orleans, who exchanged his first class ticket for two third-class tickets to share with Barthé. This trip exposed Barthé to classical art, but also to performers such as Féral Benga and African-American entertainer Josephine Baker, of whom he made portraits in 1935 and 1951, respectively. During the next two decades, he built his reputation as a sculptor. He was awarded several awards and has experienced success after success and was considered by writers and critics as one of the leading "moderns" of his time. Among his African-American friends were Wallace Thurman, Claude McKay, Langston Hughes, Jimmie Daniels, Countee Cullen, and Harold Jackman. Ralph Ellison was his first student. Supporters who were white included Carl Van Vechten, Noel Sullivan, Charles Cullen, Lincoln Kirstein, Paul Cadmus, Edgar Kaufmann Jr., and Jared French.

In 1945, Barthé became a member of the National Sculpture Society.

A silent short documentary on "the Negro artist". Barthé working on Kalombwan (1934)

== Later life ==
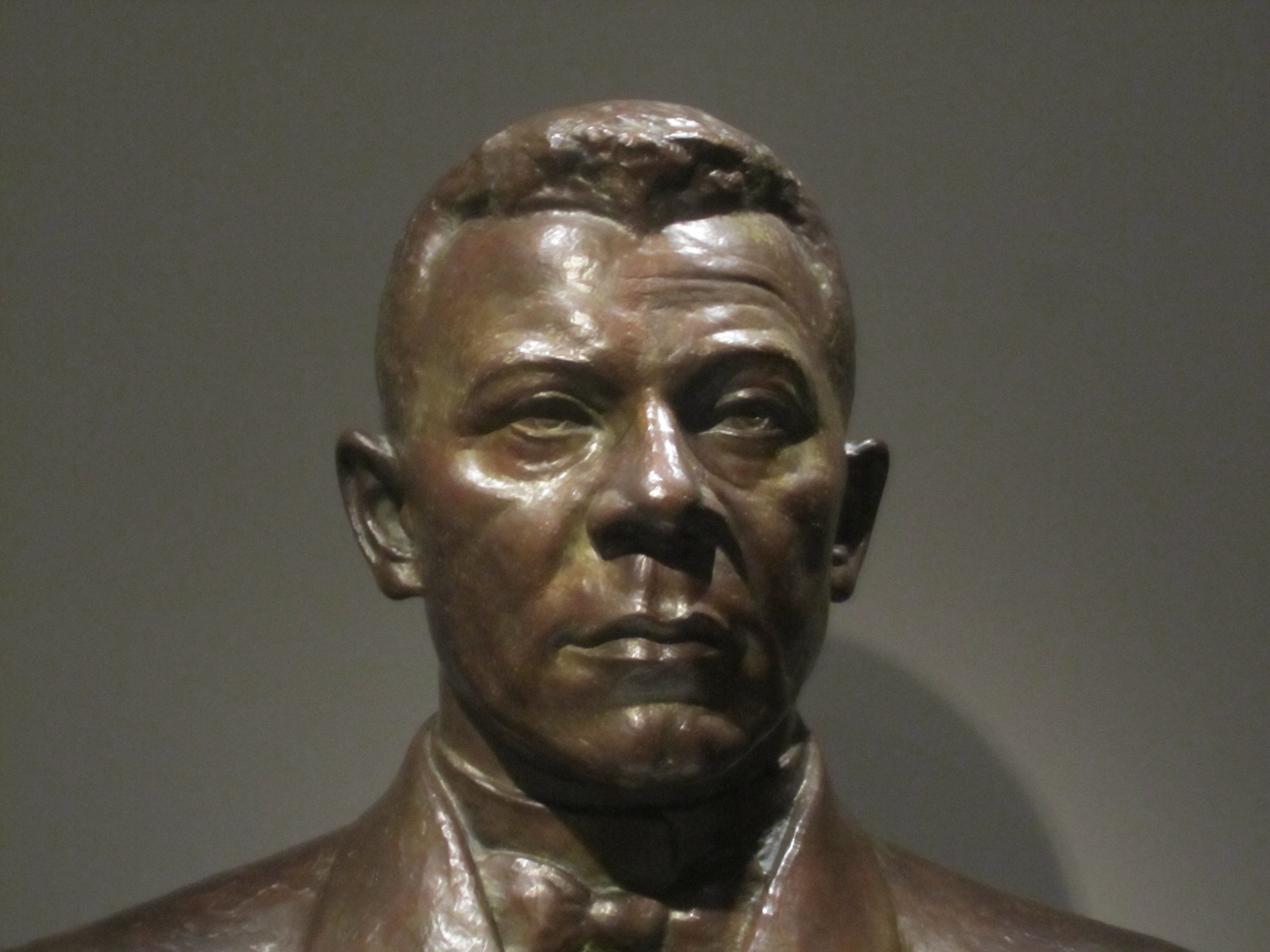
Booker T. Washington, 1946, National Portrait Gallery

Eventually, the tense environment and violence of the city began to take its toll, and he decided to abandon his life of fame and move to Jamaica in the West Indies in 1947. His career flourished in Jamaica, and he remained there until the mid-1960s when ever-growing violence forced him to move again. For the next five years, he lived in Switzerland, Spain, and Italy, then settled in Pasadena, California in a rental apartment. In this apartment, Barthé worked on his memoirs, and, most importantly, editioned many of his works with the financial assistance of actor James Garner until his death in 1989. Garner copyrighted Barthé's artwork, hired a biographer to organize and document his work, and established the Richmond Barthe Trust.

== Public works ==
Barthé's first public commission came from the New York City's Federal Art Project and for the 80-foot bas-relief in cast stone, (1939), for the embellishment of the Harlem River Houses complex, but upon completion, his work was installed at the Kingsborough Houses in Brooklyn. His other most notable public works include a monumental bronze of Toussaint L’Ouverture, (1950), in front of the National Palace in Port-au-Prince, Haiti; 40-foot bronze equestrian statue Jean Jacques Dessalines, (1952), at Champs-du-Mars, Port-au-Prince, Haiti; a cast stone relief of American Eagle, (1940), on the façade of Social Security Board Building in Washington, DC; a marble Arthur Brisbane Memorial in New York City, (1939), a later enlarged version of a sculpture of Rose McClendon (1932), for Frank Lloyd Wright's Fallingwater, (c.1935); and the design of several Haitian coins, still in use today.

=== Haitian works ===
Barthe's Haitian works came in a time after his 1950 move to Ocho Rios, Jamaica, and were among his larger and more famous works. The huge 40-foot equestrian bronze of Jean Jacques Dessalines, (1952), was one of four heroic sculptures commissioned in 1948 by Haitian political leaders to mark independence celebrations. The Dessalines monument was part of a larger 1954 restoration of the Champs-du-Mars park in Port-au-Prince, Barthe's 40-foot-high Toussaint L’Ouverture statue (1950), and stone monument was positioned nearer the National Palace, and was unveiled in 1950 with two other commissioned heroic sculptures (in the capital and in the north of the county) by Cuban sculptor Blanco Ramos. At the time, one African-American newspaper called the collection "the Greatest Negro Monuments on earth." L'Overture was a subject Barthe returned to several times, having created a bust (1926) and painted portrait (1929) of the figure early in his career.

== Exhibitions ==
Barthé's debut as a professional sculptor was at The Negro in Art Week exhibition in Chicago in 1927. His first solo exhibition was held at the Women's City Club in Chicago in 1930, exhibiting a selection of 38 works of sculpture, painting, and works on paper. In 1932, the Whitney Museum of American Art decided to purchase a bronze copy of the Blackberry Woman (1930) after exhibiting it at the opening exhibition of Contemporary American Artists in 1932. Barthé's work was paired with drawings by Delacroix, Matisse, Laurencin, Daumier, and Forain at the Caz-Delbo Gallery in 1933 in New York City. In 1942, he had an exhibition of 20 works of art at the South Side Community Art Center in Chicago. The retrospective which included works from private collections shown for the first time, Richmond Barthé: The Seeker was the inaugural exhibition of the African American Galleries at the Ohr-O'Keefe Museum of Art in Biloxi, Mississippi, curated by Margaret Rose Vendryes, PhD.

Barthé's most recent retrospective, titled Richmond Barthé: His Life in Art, consisted of over 30 sculptures and photographs. The exhibition was organized by Landau Traveling Exhibitions of Los Angeles, CA, in 2009. The exhibition venues included the Charles H. Wright Museum of African American History, the California African American Museum, the Dixon Gallery and Gardens, and the NCCU Art Museum.

== Collections ==
The Whitney Museum of American Art purchased Barthé's bronze copy of the Blackberry Woman (1930) in 1932, after the inaugural exhibition Whitney Annual in 1932. The African Dancer (1933) was purchased after being displayed in Whitney Annual in 1933 as well as the Comedian in 1935. The Metropolitan Museum of Art purchased The Boxer (1942) after Artists for Victory exhibition at the same museum in 1942. Barthé's other pieces are in the collections of the Smithsonian American Art Museum; the Art Institute of Chicago, Fallingwater, and others.

== Recognition ==
Richmond Barthé received many honors during his career, including the Rosenwald Fellowship in 1930 and the Guggenheim Fellowship in 1940. Barthé was also the first African-American artist to be represented, together with the painter Jacob Lawrence, in the Metropolitan Museum of Art's permanent collection. In 1945, he was elected to the American Academy of Arts and Letters. He also received awards for interracial justice and honorary degrees from Xavier University and St. Francis University. He was the recipient of the Audubon Artists Gold Medal in 1950. A few years after his arrival in Pasadena, California, the city renamed the street where Barthé lived as Barthé Drive. He also was honored and received an award from U.S. President Jimmy Carter in 1980.

== Personal life ==
=== Sexuality ===
Once, when interviewed, Barthé indicated that he was homosexual. Throughout his life, he had occasional romantic relationships that were short-lived. In an undated letter to African-American art critic Alain Locke, he indicated that he desired a long-term relationship with a "Negro friend and a lover". The book Barthé: A Life in Sculpture by Margaret Rose Vandryes links Barthé to writer Lyle Saxon, Locke, sculptor John Rhoden, and the photographer Carl Van Vechten. According to a letter from Locke to Richard Bruce Nugent, Barthé had a romantic relationship with Nugent, a cast member from the production of Porgy & Bess.

=== Religious beliefs ===
Barthé was a devoted Catholic. Many of Barthé's later work depicted religious subjects, including John the Baptist (1942), Come Unto Me (1945), Head of Jesus (1949), Angry Christ (1946), and Resurrection (1969). Works like The Mother (1935), Mary (1945), or his unfinished Crucifixion (c. 1944) are noticeably influenced by the interracial justice for what he was awarded the James J. Hoey Award by the Catholic Interracial Council in 1945.

== Bibliography ==
- Adams, Russell L. Great Negroes: Past and Present. Chicago, Illinois: Afro-Am Publishing Company, 1976. ISBN 9780910030083
- Bearden, Romare; Henderson, Harry. A History of African-American Artists: From 1972 to the Present. New York: Pantheon, 1993. ISBN 9780394570167
- Gates, Henry Lewis. Higginbotham, Evelyn Brooks. W.E.B. Du Bois Institute for African American Research. African American Lives. New York: Oxford University Press, 2004. ISBN 019516024X
- Golas, Carrie. Barthe, Richmond 1901–1989. In Contemporary Black Biography. Volume 14. Gale Research, 1997. ISBN 978-0-7876-0953-5
- Horak, Jan-Christopher. Lovers of Cinema : The First American Film Avant-Garde, 1919 - 1945. Madison: University of Wisconsin Press, 1995. ISBN 978-0299146801
- Lewis, Samella. Richmond Barthé: His Life in Art. Unity Works, 2009. ISBN 978-0-692-00201-8
- Nugent, Richard Bruce. Gay Rebel of the Harlem Renaissance. Durham and London: Duke University Press, 2002. ISBN 9780822329138
- Pamphile, Léon Dénius. Haitians and African Americans: A Heritage of Tragedy and Hope. University Press of Florida, 2001. ISBN 978-0-8130-2119-5
- Vendryes, Margaret Rose. Barthé: A Life in Sculpture. University Press of Mississippi, 2008. ISBN 1604730927
- Zabunyan, Elvan. Black Is a Color: A History of African-American Artists. Paris: Editions Dis Voir, 2005. ISBN 2914563205
- Queer modernism 1900 to 1950. Hirmer, München 2025, ISBN 978-3-7774-4588-5.
