= List of winners of the William E. Harmon Foundation Award for Distinguished Achievement Among Negroes =

The William E. Harmon Foundation Award for Distinguished Achievement Among Negroes, commonly referred to as the "Harmon award" or "Harmon Foundation award", was a philanthropic and cultural award created in 1926 by William E. Harmon and administered by the Harmon Foundation. It was offered for distinguished achievements in eight different fields: literature, music, fine arts, business and industry, science and innovation, education, religious service, and race relations. Although awards were created in eight categories, it is best known for its recognition of African-American art of the Harlem Renaissance, and particularly of the visual arts.

A description of the bronze medal won by A.M.E. Bishop John Fletcher Hurst in 1926 appeared in the January 8, 1927, edition of the Afro-American, published in Baltimore, Maryland:

The medal is of unusually beautiful design. On the obverse side is embossed a ship in full sail on the open sea with the inscription "Harmon Foundation" around the margin. On the reverse side are the words "Inspiration, Achievement Religious Service. Second award, 1926, John Hurst".

A full list of the winners of each year was offered in contemporary New York Times articles.

== 1926 ==
Race relations (Note: Winners, categories and awards for this year compiled from The New York Times (December 8, 1926).)

- Will W. Alexander (Director of the Commission on Interracial Cooperation), First award and Gold medal for Distinguished Achievements in Race Relations, "January 23, 1927, at the Second Baptist Church in Atlanta".

Fine arts

- Palmer C. Hayden, First award and Gold medal, for the seascape Schooners.
- Hale Woodruff, Second award and Bronze medal for Two Women

Literature

- Countee Cullen, First award and Gold medal, on the basis of his first book.
- James Weldon Johnson, Second award and Bronze medal for his "introductory essay to his books on Negro Spirituals"

Education

- Virginia Estelle Randolph, First award and Gold medal.
- Arthur Schomberg, Second award and Bronze medal, awarded "for his collection of publications on Negro life and history"

Industry, including business

- C. C. Spaulding, First award and Gold medal.
- Archie Alexander Second award and Bronze medal.

Religious services

- Max Yergan, First award and Gold medal.
- Bishop John Hurst, Second award and Bronze medal.

Science, including Invention

- James C. Evans, First award and Gold medal. Awarded for research in electrical engineering, for "two theses in regenerative circuits in radio, submitted for the bachelor's and master's degrees in engineering."
- W. A. Daniel, Second award and Bronze medal for his social study on "The Education of Negro Ministers."

Music

- No submissions deemed worthy of award.

== 1927 ==
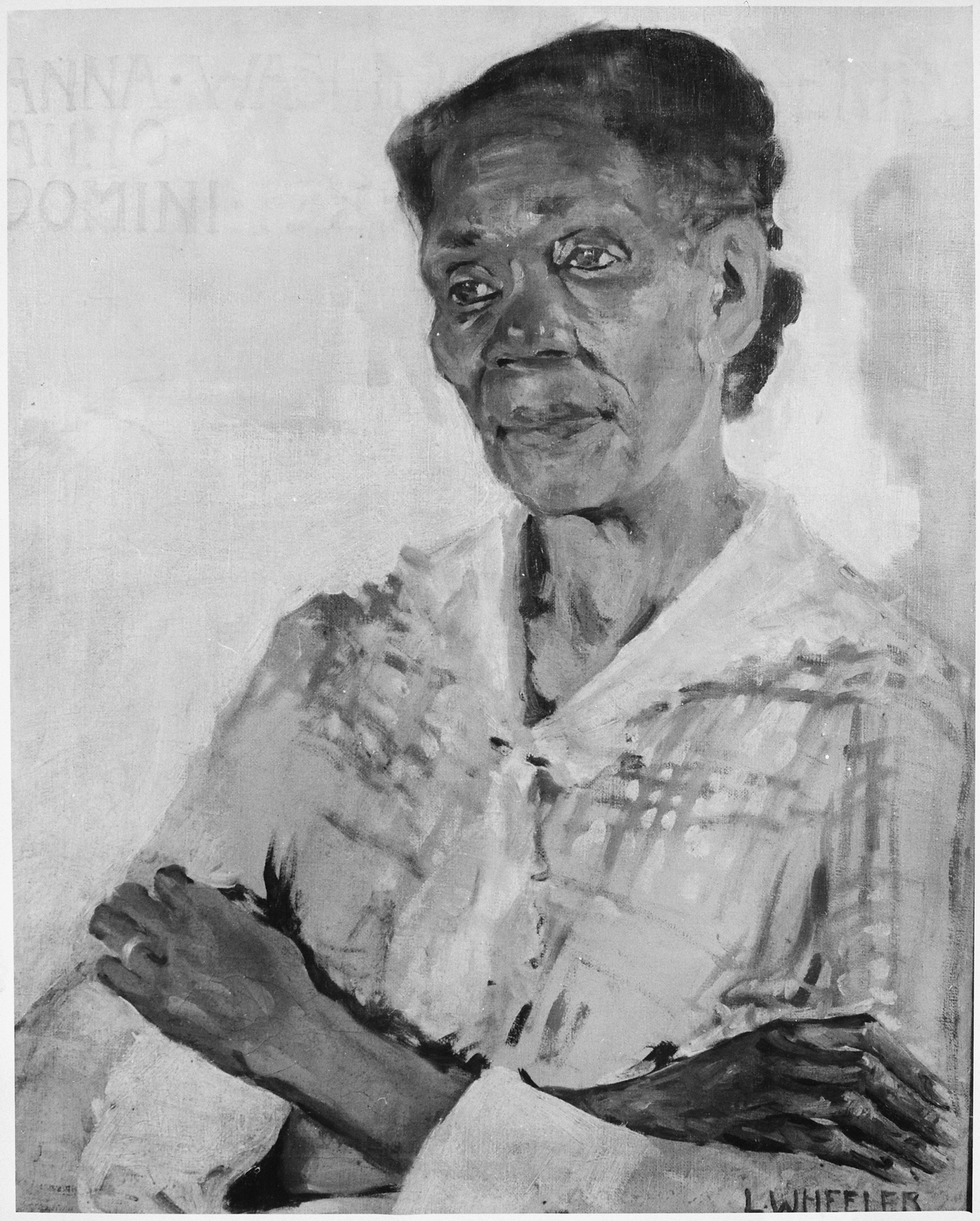
Laura Wheeler Waring's Gold Award portrait, "Anne Washington Derry"

Race relations (Note: Winners, categories and awards for this year compiled from The New York Times (January 9, 1928).)

- Julius Rosenwald, philanthropist. First award and Gold medal, $500.
- James Hardy Dillard. First award and Gold medal, $500.

Fine arts

- Laura Wheeler Waring, First award and Gold medal.
- William Edouard Scott, Gold medal. Though Work and Guzman scrupulously document the cash awards received, no mention of a cash award is made for Scott. His was a "special award of a gold medal", falling outside of the normal scope for the award: "... because of the finished and excellent character of his paintings and the recognition already received. Mr. Scott was considered by the judges to be outside the purpose of the awards but deserving of distinction."
- John Wesley Hardrick, Second award and Bronze medal.

Literature

- James Weldon Johnson, First award and Gold medal for his poetry collection, "God's Trombones".
- Eric Derwent Walrond Second award and Bronze medal for a collection of stories, "Tropic Death."

Education

- John Warren Davis, First award and Gold medal.
- Benjamin Brawley, Second award and Bronze medal. Brawley declined the award: "... a well-known educator and writer, Brawley declined the second-place award because, he said, he had never done anything but first-class work."

Industry, including business

- Anthony Overton First award and Gold medal
- William Gaston Pearson Second award and Bronze medal

Religious services

- Reverend William N. DeBerry, First award and Gold medal for "distinguished service in religion and social welfare among Negroes of the United States".
- Robert E. Jones, Second award and Bronze medal.

Science, including Invention

- James A. Parsons, First award and Gold medal for advances made with rust-resistant or non-corrosive metals: "James Parsons, Jr., a metallurgist, winner of the Harmon Award in Science [in] 1927.. for many years been in charge of research and production for the Duriron Company of Dayton, Ohio. He ... holds many patents in a highly competitive field and has opened new avenues for our men"
- No Second award

Music

- R. Nathaniel Dett, First award and Gold medal for vocal and instrumental compositions.
- Clarence C. White, First award and Gold medal for his work as a violinist and composer.
- E. H. Margetson, Second award and Bronze medal for his work in composing orchestrations for symphonies for both instruments and voices.
- William Grant Still, Second award and Bronze medal.

== 1928 ==
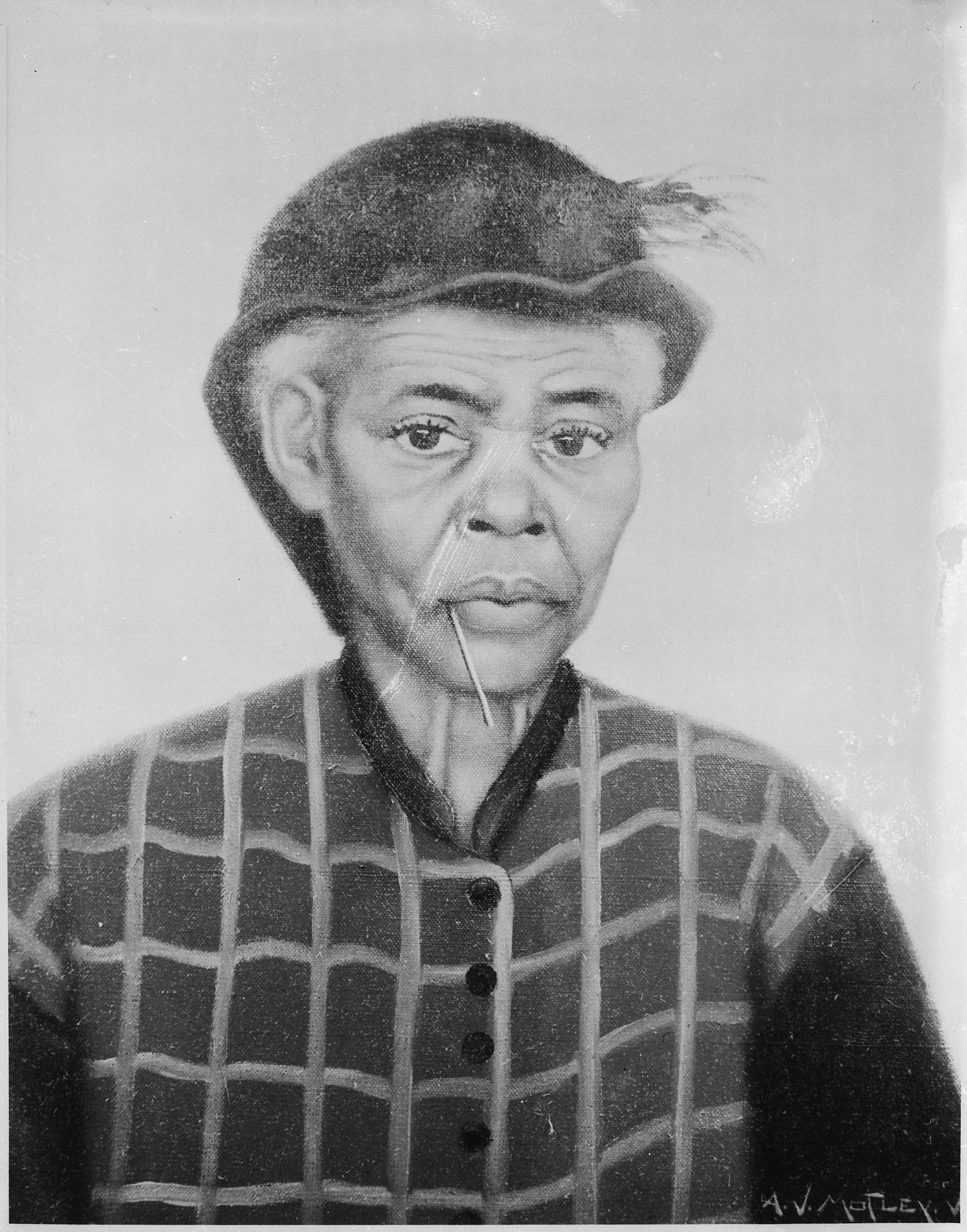
"Old Snuff Dipper" was Archibald J. Motley's Gold medal winning entry

Race relations (Note: Winners, categories and awards for this year compiled from The New York Times (February 13, 1929).)

- No award.

Fine arts

- Archibald J. Motley, First award and Gold medal.
- May Howard Jackson, sculptor, Second award and Bronze medal.

Literature

- Claude McKay First award and Gold medal.
- Nella Larsen Imes, Second award and Bronze medal.

Education

- Monroe Work.
- John Manuel Gandy, Second award and Bronze medal.

Industry, including business

- S.W. Rutherford, First award and Gold medal.
- Frederick Massiah, Second award and Bronze medal.

Religious services

- Lacey Kirk Williams, First award and Gold medal.
- James Solomon Russell, First award and Gold medal.
- Channing H. Tobias, Second award and Bronze medal.

Science, including Invention

- No awards

Music

- No first award
- J. Harold Brown, Second award and Bronze medal.

== 1929 ==
Race relations (Note: Winners, categories and awards for this year compiled from The New York Times (January 6, 1930).)

- Robert Russa Moton

Fine arts

- William H. Johnson, First award and Gold medal.
- Albert Alexander Smith, Second award and Bronze medal.
- Sargent Johnson, Second award and Bronze medal.

Literature

- No first award.
- Walter White, Second award and Bronze medal for Rope and Faggot: A Biography of Judge Lynch

Education

- William Jasper Hale First award and Gold medal.
- John Hope, First award and Gold medal.
- Janie Porter Barrett, Second award and Bronze medal.

Industry, including business

- Truman K. Gibson, First award and Gold medal.
- John Charles Calybrook, Second award and Bronze medal.

Religious services

- Bishop Robert E. Jones, First award and Gold medal.
- A. Clayton Powell, Second award and Bronze medal.

Science, including Invention

- Theodore K. Lawless, First award and Gold medal (dermatology).
- No Second award.

Music

- Harry Thacker Burleigh, First award and Gold medal.
- Harry Lawrence Freeman, First award and Gold medal.
- Carl Rossini Diton, Second award and Bronze medal.

== 1930 ==
- No Second awards were given. (Note: Winners, categories and awards for this year compiled from The New York Times (January 26, 1931).)

Race relations

- No award

Fine arts

- James Lesesne Wells, First award and Gold medal. for "The Wanderers"

Literature

- Langston Hughes, First award and Gold medal for Not without Laughter

Education

- Henry A. Hunt, First award and Gold medal.

Industry, including business

- Albon Holsey, First award and Gold medal.

Religious services

- Henry C. McDowell, First award and Gold medal.

Science, including Invention

- Charles S. Johnson, First award and Gold medal.

Music

- Hall Johnson, First award and Gold medal.

Agriculture

- Thomas Monroe Campbell First award and Gold medal, "the first Harmon Award ever presented for distinguished achievement in the field of farming and rural life."
