= William E. Harmon Foundation Award for Distinguished Achievement Among Negroes =

Award offered for distinguished achievements in eight different fields

Harmon Foundation Award
- Description: Award for distinguished achievement among African Americans
- Country: United States
- Presented by: Harmon Foundation

The William E. Harmon Foundation Award for Distinguished Achievement Among Negroes, commonly referred to as the Harmon Award or Harmon Foundation Award, was a philanthropic and cultural award created in 1926 by William E. Harmon and administered by the Harmon Foundation. It was offered for distinguished achievements in eight different fields: literature, music, fine arts, business and industry (such as banker Anthony Overton in 1927), science and innovation, education (for example, educator Janie Porter Barrett in 1929), religious service, and race relations.

== Categories and historical significance ==
Although awards were created in eight categories, it is best known for its impact on African-American art of the Harlem Renaissance, and particularly on the visual arts. During its existence the Harmon award was largely considered synonymous with Negro visual art:

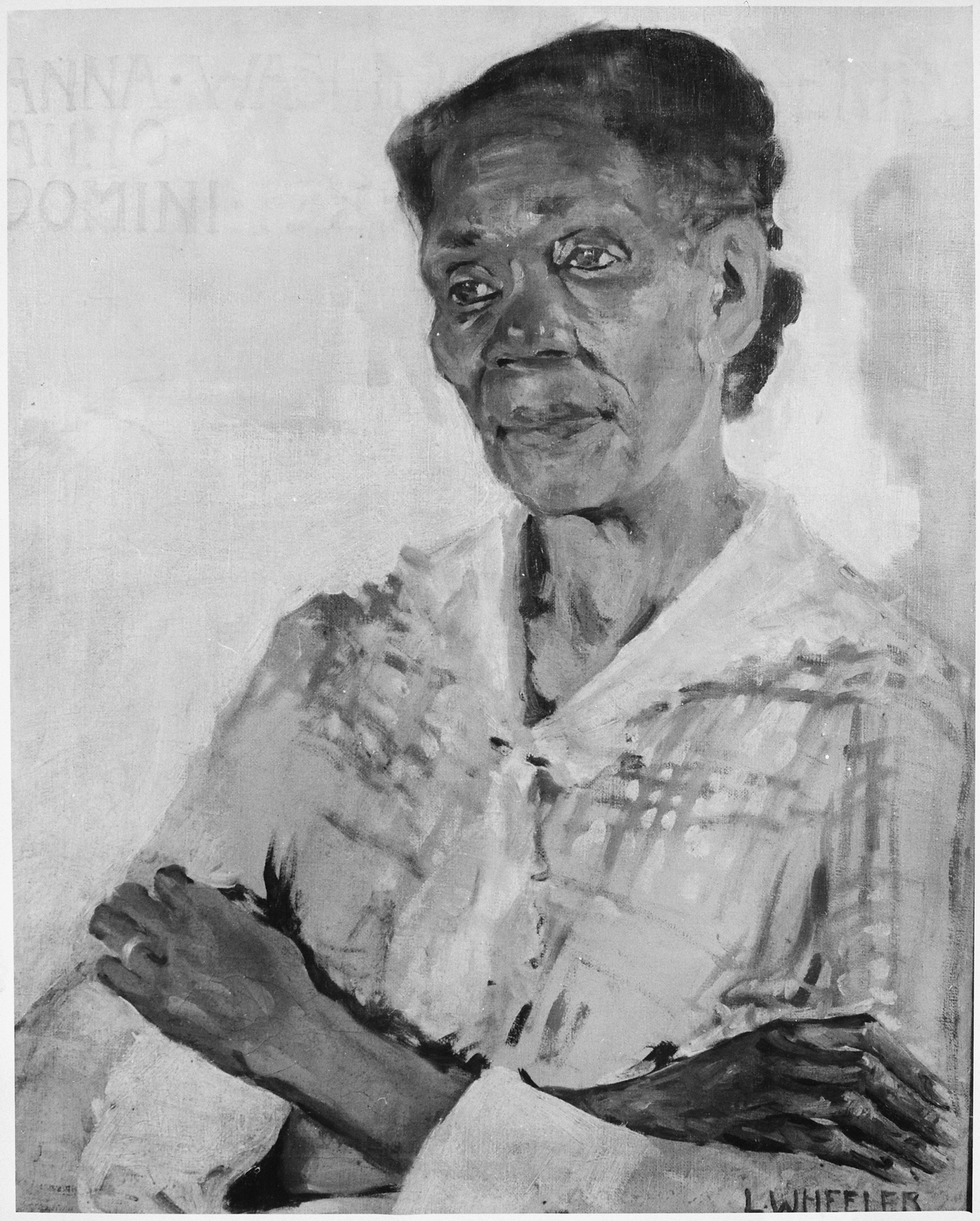
Laura Wheeler Waring's portrait, Anne Washington Derry, Gold Award (1927)

...the introduction of the Harmon foundation awards in 1926, which were always dispensed with a flurry of publicity, marked the beginning of a new era for Negro visual art. With its private endowment, popular social mission, and interracial alliances, [it] possessed a much greater public relations capacity than any other prior initiatives....Due in large part to the activities of the Harmon Foundation, African Americans emerged as a distinct presence in the American art world.

Among the many recipients of the awards in literature and the fine arts were Claude McKay, Hale Woodruff, Palmer Hayden, Archibald Motley (his winning piece was The Octoroon Girl), Countee Cullen and Langston Hughes.

The awards were closely associated with an annual Exhibition of the Work of Negro Artists, conceived by Mary Brady. Exhibitions were held in 1927 through 1931, 1933, and 1935, and featured "substantial prizes" together with gold and bronze medals. According to Gates and Higginbotham, "...submissions in the fine arts category was the chief venue open to African American artists"

Awards were given solely on the basis of achievements in the previous year. The first year the awards were granted (1926) the judges of the awards proposed giving Gold award for literature to Charles W. Chesnutt, "...to acknowledge his pioneering work and continuing example to other African American writers". Their intention was to waive the requirement that the award be granted solely for works completed during the previous year. However, the Harmon Foundation did not accept this proposal, and Chesnutt never learned of this "acknowledgment of high esteem from a distinguished panel of his literary peers both black and white."

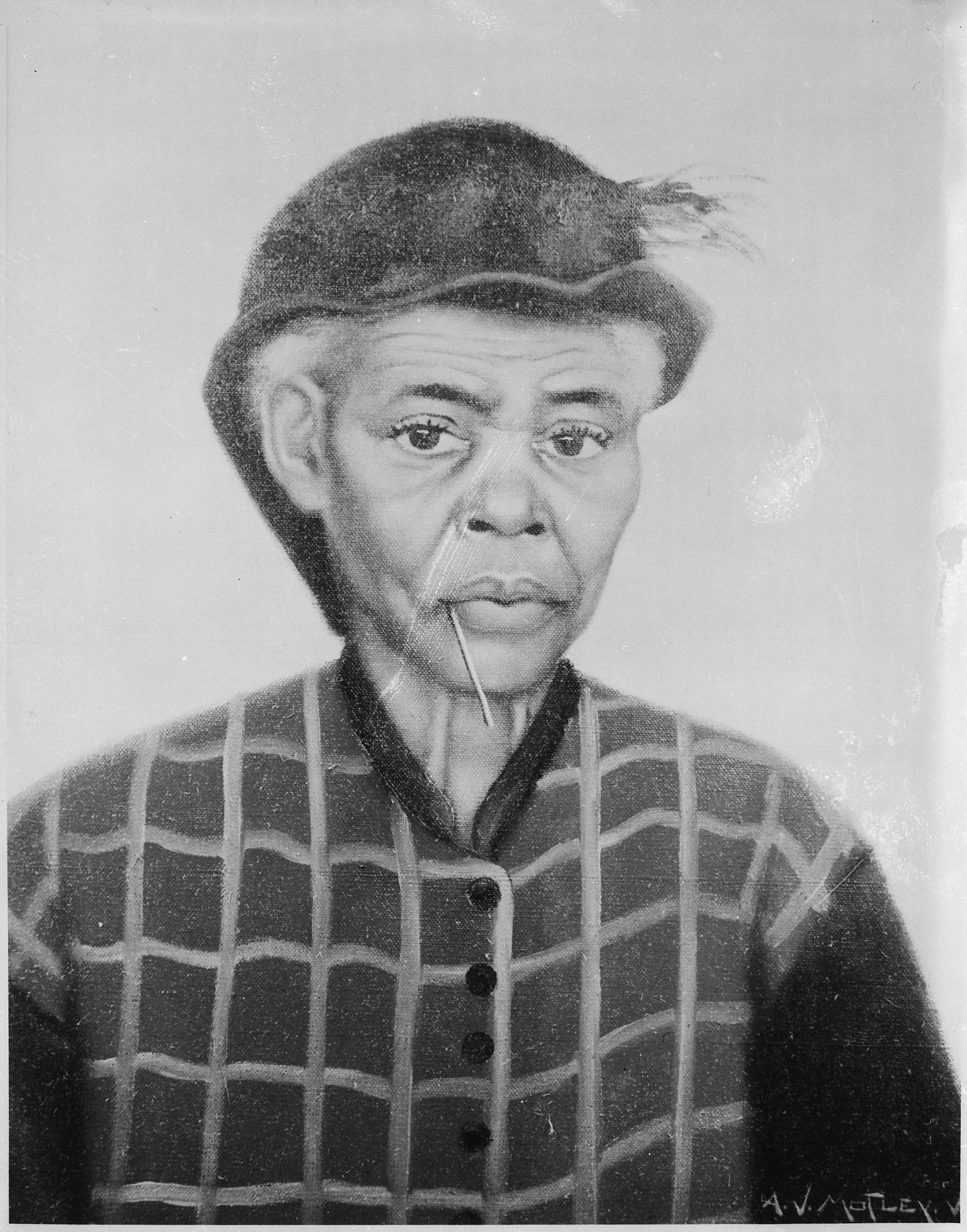
Archibald J. Motley's Old Snuff Dipper, Gold medal (1928

Recipients of the award in every field except race relations were required to be African American – the latter could be awarded to "...any person of American residence, regardless of color, who has made an outstanding contribution toward improving relations between the white and Negro people in America." Thus Robert Russa Moton was the first African American to receive the race relations award (in 1930). He was preceded by Will W. Alexander in 1927, and a dual award to Julius Rosenwald and James Hardy Dillard in 1927, all of whom who were Caucasian.

Gold and Bronze medals were awarded in the various categories. The Gold carried a $400 cash prize (adjusted for inflation, the 1926 prize would be worth $7,274.44 in the US dollars of 2025; the 1933 prize $9,948.59); the Bronze prize was $100. The award for race relations had a much larger honorarium: it varied between $500 and $1,000.

A description of the Bronze medal won by A.M.E. Bishop John Hurst in 1926 appeared in the January 8, 1927, edition of the Baltimore, Maryland Afro-American:

The medal is of unusually beautiful design. On the obverse side is embossed a ship in full sail on the open sea with the inscription "Harmon Foundation" around the margin. On the reverse side are the words "Inspiration, Achievement Religious Service. Second award, 1926, John Hurst".

Administered during its first five years (1926–33) by Dr. George E. Haynes, the awards program was discontinued in 1933, which would have been the year of the 1932 awards. However, no awards had been granted in the previous year. A New York Times article in 1931 described the race relation category of the awards as "biennial".

== Winners ==
A full list of the winners of each year was offered in contemporary New York Times articles.

Date	Category	Award	Prize	Recipient	Notes
1926	Race relations	First Award	Gold Medal, $500	Will W. Alexander	Director of the Commission on Interracial Cooperation
1926	Fine Arts	First Award	Gold Medal	Palmer C. Hayden	Schooners (seascape)
1926	Fine Arts	Second Award	Bronze Medal	Hale Woodruff	Two Women
1926	Literature	First Award	Gold Medal	Countee Cullen	on the basis of his first book
1926	Literature	Second Award	Bronze Medal	James Weldon Johnson	for his "introductory essay to his books on Negro Spirituals"
1926	Education	First Award	Gold Medal	Virginia Estelle Randolph	
1926	Education	Second Award	Bronze Medal	Arthur Schomberg	"for his collection of publications on Negro life and history"
1926	Industry, including business	First Award	Gold Medal	C. C. Spaulding	
1926	Industry, including business	Second Award	Bronze Medal	Archie Alexander	
1926	Religious services	First Award	Gold Medal	Max Yergan	
1926	Religious services	Second Award	Bronze Medal	Bishop John Hurst	
1926	Science, including Invention	First Award	Gold Medal	James C. Evans	for research in electrical engineering, for "two theses in regenerative circuits in radio, submitted for the bachelor's and master's degrees in engineering."
1926	Science, including Invention	Second Award	Bronze Medal	W. A. Daniel	for his social study on "The Education of Negro Ministers."
1926	Music	no awards			
1927	Race relations	First Award	Gold Medal, $500	James Hardy Dillard.	President, the Jeanes Fund and the John F. Slater Fund, Charlottesville, VA
1927	Race relations	Special Award	Gold Medal	Julius Rosenwald	Philanthropist, chairman of the Board of Directors of Sears-Roebuck, Chicago, IL.
1927	Fine Arts	First Award	Gold Medal	Laura Wheeler Waring	
1927	Fine Arts	Special Award	Gold Medal	William Edouard Scott	Though Work and Guzman scrupulously document the cash awards received, no mention of a cash award is made for Scott. His was a "special award of a gold medal", falling outside of the normal scope for the award: "... because of the finished and excellent character of his paintings and the recognition already received. Mr. Scott was considered by the judges to be outside the purpose of the awards but deserving of distinction."
1927	Fine Arts	Second Award	Bronze Medal	John Wesley Hardrick	
1927	Literature	First Award	Gold Medal	James Weldon Johnson	For his poetry collection, God's Trombones.
1927	Literature	Second Award	Bronze Medal	Eric Derwent Walrond	For a collection of stories, Tropic Death.
1927	Education	First Award	Gold Medal	John Warren Davis	
1927	Education	Second Award	Bronze Medal	Benjamin Brawley	Brawley declined the award: "... a well-known educator and writer, Brawley declined the second-place award because, he said, he had never done anything but first-class work."
1927	Industry, including business	First Award	Gold Medal	Anthony Overton	
1927	Industry, including business	Second Award	Bronze Medal	William Gaston Pearson	
1927	Religious services	First Award	Gold Medal	Reverend William N. DeBerry	"distinguished service in religion and social welfare among Negroes of the United States".
1927	Religious services	Second Award	Bronze Medal	Robert E. Jones	
1927	Science, including Invention	First Award	Gold Medal	James A. Parsons	advances made with rust-resistant or non-corrosive metals: James Parsons, Jr., a metallurgist, winner of the Harmon Award in Science [in] 1927.. for many years been in charge of research and production for the Duriron Company of Dayton, Ohio. He ... holds many patents in a highly competitive field and has opened new avenues for our men"
1927	Science, including Invention	Second Award	no award		
1927	Music	First Award	Gold Medal	R. Nathaniel Dett	for vocal and instrumental compositions.
1927	Music	First Award	Gold Medal	Clarence C. White	for work as a violinist and composer.
1927	Music	Second Award	Bronze Medal	E.H. Margetson	for work in composing orchestrations for symphonies for both instruments and voices.
1927	Music	Second Award	Bronze Medal	William Grant Still	
1928	Race relations	no award			
1928	Fine Arts	First Award	Gold Medal, $400	Archibald J. Motley	of Chicago, IL, for "The Octoroon Girl" and other paintings
1928	Fine Arts	Second Award	Bronze Medal, $100	May Howard Jackson	of Washington, D.C.l for "Bust of Dean Kelly Miller, Howard University," and other sculptures
1928	Literature	First Award	Gold Medal, $400	Claude McKay	formerly of New York, NY, for "power, skill, and originality in verse and prose" in Harlem Shadows and Home to Harlem.
1928	Literature	Second Award	Bronze Medal, $100	Nella Larson Imes	of New York, NY, for her novel, Quicksand
1928	Education	First Award	Gold Medal, $400	Monroe N. Work	Tuskegee Institute, Alabama, GA, for The Negro Yearbook and Bibliography of the Negro in Africa and America.
1928	Education	Second Award	Bronze Medal, $100	John Manuel Gandy	President, Virginia State College, Ettricks, VA,
1928	Industry, including business	First Award	Gold Medal, $400	S.W. Rutherford	of Washington, DC, Secretary & Business Manager of the National Benefit Life Insurance Company.
1928	Industry, including business	Second Award	Bronze Medal, $100	Frederick Massiah	of Philadelphia, PA, for "outstanding work in building engineering, especially concrete construction."
1928	Religious services	First Award	Gold Medal, $400	Lacy Kirk Williams	Rev. Dr. of Chicago, IL
1928	Religious services	First Award	Gold Medal, $400	James Solomon Russell	Archdeacon of the Episcopal Diocese of Southern Virginia, Lawrenceville, VA
1928	Religious services	Second Award	Bronze Medal, $100	Channing H. Tobias	Secretary of the National Council of the YMCA, New York, NY
1928	Science, including Invention	no awards			
1928	Music	First Award	no award		
1928	Music	Second Award	Bronze Medal	J. Harold Brown	Musical Director, Attucks High School, Indianapolis, IN
1928	Honorable Mentions			Albert Alexander Smith	of New York, NY
1928	Honorable Mentions			Malvin Gray Johnson	of New York, NY
1928	Honorable Mentions			James L. Allen	of New York, NY
1928	Honorable Mentions			E.T. McDowell	of New York, NY
1929	Race relations	First Award	Gold Medal, $1000	Robert Russa Moton	Principal of Tuskegee Institute in Alabama, GA (first black recipient in this category)
1929	Fine Arts	First Award	Gold Medal, $400	William H. Johnson	of New York, NY
1929	Fine Arts	Second Award	Bronze Medal, $100	Albert Alexander Smith	of Manhasset, L.I., NY
1929	Fine Arts	Second Award	Bronze Medal, $100	Sargent Johnson	of Berkeley, CA
1929	Literature	First Award	no award		
1929	Literature	Second Award	Bronze Medal, $100	Walter Francis White	Rope and Faggot: A Biography of Judge Lynch, of New York, NY
1929	Education	First Award	Gold Medal, $400	William Jasper Hale	President, Agricultural & Industrial State College, Nashville, Tennessee
1929	Education	First Award	Gold Medal, $400	John Hope	President, Atlanta University, GA
1929	Education	Second Award	Bronze Medal, $100	Janie Porter Barrett	of Peak's Turn out, VA
1929	Industry, including business	First Award	Gold Medal, $400	Truman K. Gibson	Merged three companies to form The Supreme Life Liberty Insurance Company, Chicago, IL
1929	Industry, including business	Second Award	Bronze Medal, $100	John Charles Claybrook	of Proctor, AK
1929	Religious services	First Award	Gold Medal, $400	Bishop Robert E. Jones	Bishop of the Methodist Episcopal Church, New Orleans, LA
1929	Religious services	Second Award	Bronze Medal, $100	A. Clayton Powell	of New York, NY
1929	Science, including Invention	First Award	Gold Medal, $400	Theodore K. Lawless	Dermatologist, Research and Lecture Fellow at the Northwestern University, Chicago, IL
1929	Science, including Invention	Second Award	no award		
1929	Music	First Award	Gold Medal, $400	Harry Thacker Burleigh	Soloist, St. George Episcopal Church, New York, NY, Lecturer on Negro Music, Arranger of Negro Spirituals
1929	Music	First Award	Gold Medal, $400	Harry Lawrence Freeman	Composer of the first Negro Opera, New York, NY
1929	Music	Second Award	Bronze Medal, $100	Carl Rossini Diton	of New York, NY
1930	Race relations	no awards			
1930	Fine Arts	First Award	Gold Medal, $400	James Lesesne Wells	for The Wanderers
1930	Literature	First Award	Gold Medal	Langston Hughes	for Not Without Laughter
1930	Education	First Award	Gold Medal	Henry A. Hunt	
1930	Industry, including business	First Award	Gold Medal	Albon Holsey	
1930	Religious services	First Award	Gold Medal, $400	Henry C. McDowell	
1930	Science, including Invention	First Award	Gold Medal	Charles S. Johnson	
1930	Music	First Award	Gold Medal	Hall Johnson	
1930	Agriculture	First Award	Gold Medal	Thomas Monroe Campbell	"the first Harmon Award ever presented for distinguished achievement in the field of farming and rural life."

== Award Catalogues/Publications ==
- Exhibition of Fine Art by American Negro Artists (1928)
- Catalogue of an Exhibition of Paintings and Sculpture by American Negro Artists at the National Gallery of Art (1929)
- Exhibition of Fine Art by American Negro Artists (1930)
- Exhibition of Productions by Negro Artists (1933)
