= John Gandy =

John Gandy may refer to:

- John Peter Gandy (1787–1850), British architect
- John Manuel Gandy (1870–1947), college president
