= Harmon award =

The term Harmon award may refer to:

- Any of several awards created and administered by the William E. Harmon Foundation, including:
  - The William E. Harmon Foundation award for distinguished achievement among Negroes, awarded (1926–30).
  - The Harmon Foundation scholarship award, in conjunction with the Eagle Scout (Boy Scouts of America).
- The Harmon Trophy, a set of three international trophies in aeronautics.
- The Bill Harmon award, an advertising award of the Chicago Magazine Association
- The George O. Harmon Award, an award of the customer services industry presented by the Association for Services Management International
