= May Howard Jackson =

American sculptor

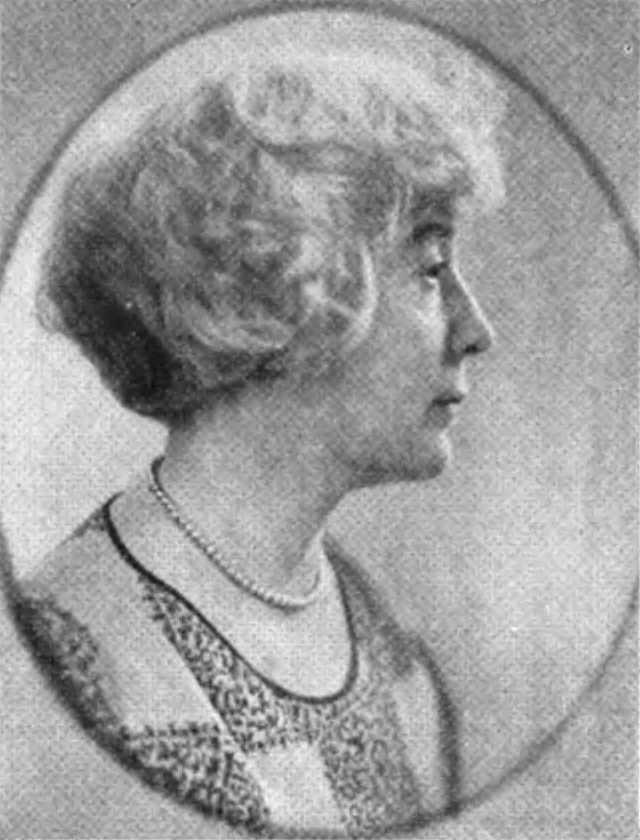
- Born: May Howard; September 7, 1877; Philadelphia, Pennsylvania, U.S.
- Died: July 12, 1931 (aged 53); New York, New York, U.S.
- Resting place: Woodlawn Cemetery, Bronx, New York
- Education: Pennsylvania Academy of Fine Arts
- Known for: Sculpture
- Notable work: Portrait Bust of Paul Lawrence Dunbar (1919): Portrait Bust of Dean Kelly Miller (1922); Mulatto Mother and Child (n.d.)
- Spouse: William Sherman Jackson
- Awards: Harmon Foundation, 1928

May Howard Jackson (September 7, 1877 – July 12, 1931) was an African American sculptor and artist. Active in the New Negro Movement and prominent in Washington, D.C.'s African American intellectual circle in the period 1910–30, she was known as "one of the first black sculptors to...deliberately use America's racial problems" as the theme of her art. Her dignified portrayals of "mulatto" individuals as well as her own struggles with her multiracial identity continue to call for the interpretation and assessment of her work.

== Early life ==
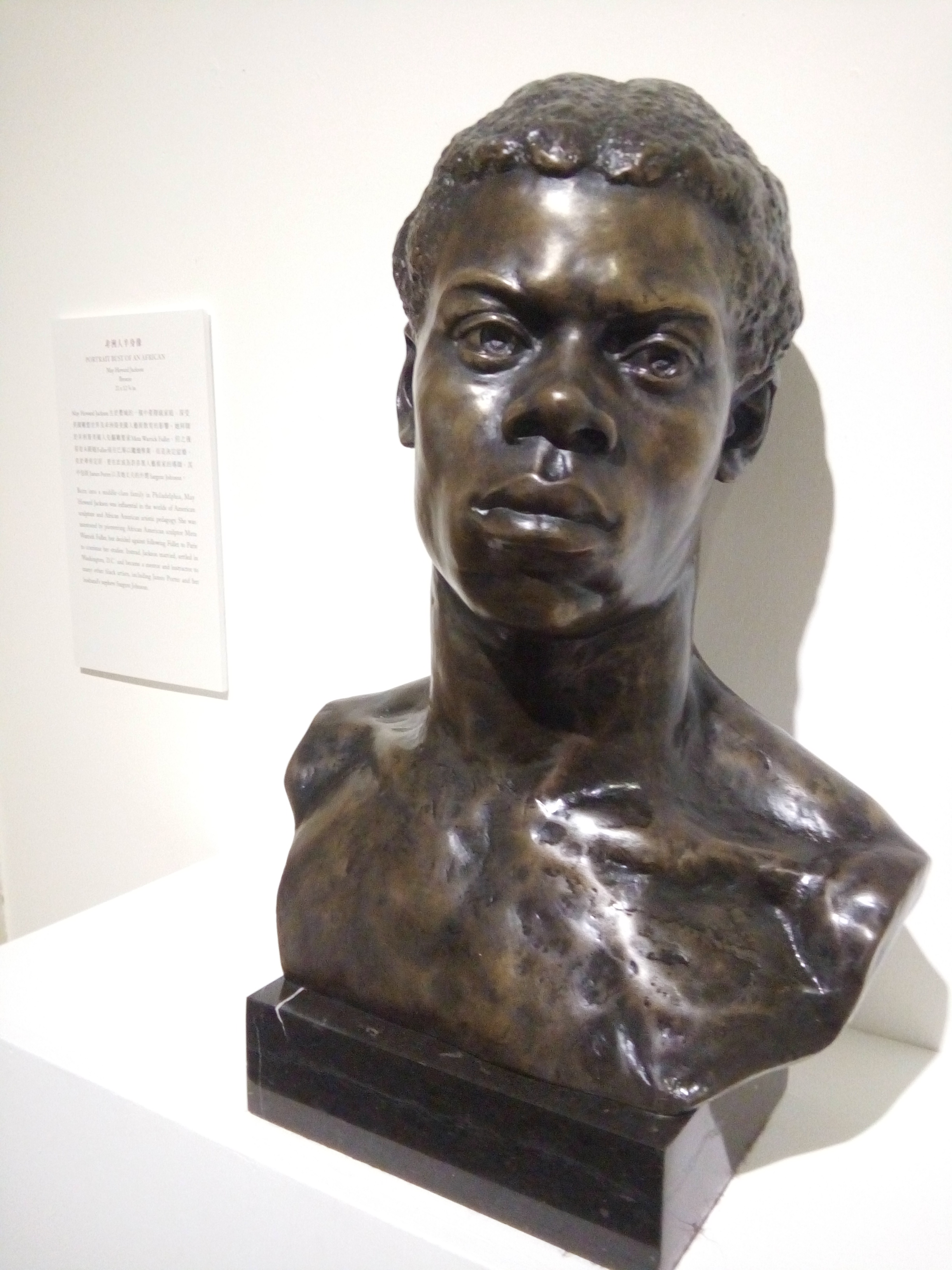
May Howard Jackson, Portrait Bust of an African, 1899. Kinsey African American Art & History Collection,

=== Education ===
May Howard was born to a middle class couple, Floarda Howard and Sallie (Durham) Howard, in Philadelphia on September 7, 1877.

She attended J. Liberty Tadd's Art School in Philadelphia, where she was trained with "new methods in education." Tadd, the school's founder, was an educational innovator who "emphasized the importance of visual arts training" to strengthen the brain, advocating an ambidextrous teaching model and six years of early-school art education. At Tadd's school May Howard studied "drawing, designing, free-hand drawing, working designs in monochrome, modeling, wood carving, and the use of tools".

She continued her art training, with the support of a full scholarship, at the Pennsylvania Academy of the Fine Arts (1895), as the first African American woman to attend PAFA, studying under various known artists including the renowned American Impressionist William Merritt Chase, Paris-trained academic sculptor Charles Grafly, and John J. Boyle (who had been a student of former PAFA faculty member Thomas Eakins). Her surviving work from this period expresses the Beaux-Arts aesthetic that emphasized naturalism and dynamic treatment of surface and form.

Meta Warrick Fuller, Jackson's contemporary at Tadd's and PAFA (like Howard, b. 1877), offered Jackson the opportunity to accompany her and study abroad in France during this time (Fuller herself had enrolled in classes at the École des Beaux Arts). Jackson declined. She would later declare she thought it unnecessary to travel to Europe to further her art.

After four years of study at PAFA, Howard met and "married well" a mathematics teacher and future high school principal, William Sherman Jackson.

=== Washington, D.C. and the M Street High School ===
By 1902, May and William were living in Washington D.C., where William was teaching at the M Street High School, the first public high school for African Americans in the United States, and, at that time, the premier preparatory academy in the nation for students of color. The faculty at M Street High School were "arguably superior to the white public schools, whose teachers typically were graduates of normal schools and teacher colleges." Many M Street teachers (William included) were the pioneering alumni of American's top academic institutions, unable, post graduation, to find employment at college institutions.

Because of these circumstances, in the first decade of the new century, the M Street High School found itself center stage for the nation's debate about the future of Black education. On the one side, Booker T. Washington, former child slave, urged Black Americans to recognize that "the masses of us are to live by the productions of our hands... No race can prosper until it learns that there is as much dignity in the tilling of a field as in the writing of a poem," and worked for access to the vocational training that could elevate and secure colored peoples' place in the American economy. On the other side was Dr. W. E. B. Du Bois, the Massachusetts born, Harvard educated leader of the New Negro Movement and a central figure in the 1908 formation of the NAACP. Du Bois's recently published book of essays, The Souls of Black Folk (1903) had catalyzed the thinking of many African Americans, countering what Du Bois saw as Mr. Washington's "cult of submission" with the contention that Black Americans must enjoy the "right to vote," "civic equality," and the education of their youth "according to ability."

For the M Street School, in competition with the nearby colored vocational school for the D.C. school department's support and resources, and straining to build the nation's first college preparatory program for colored students, Du Bois's final point here would prove a particularly contentious rallying call. Washington, approved to speak at the 1904 M Street Graduation, recommended that Blacks focus on gaining "common school and industrial training," first and foremost. Principal Anna J. Cooper countered this by inviting Du Bois to deliver a speech at the M Street School, in the winter of 1903, opposing vocational education as an acceptable standard for Black Americans. The DC director of schools accused Dr. Cooper of insubordination and disloyalty.

Cooper's tenure as Principal survived the accusations, but in 1906, she ceded her position to Jackson's husband William. May came on as faculty to teach Latin. William would step back from his role as Principal in 1909, but the couple's central role in maintaining the M Street High School's reputation for academic excellence through a difficult period left them with an invaluable social credential in Washington's Black community and beyond.

== Career ==
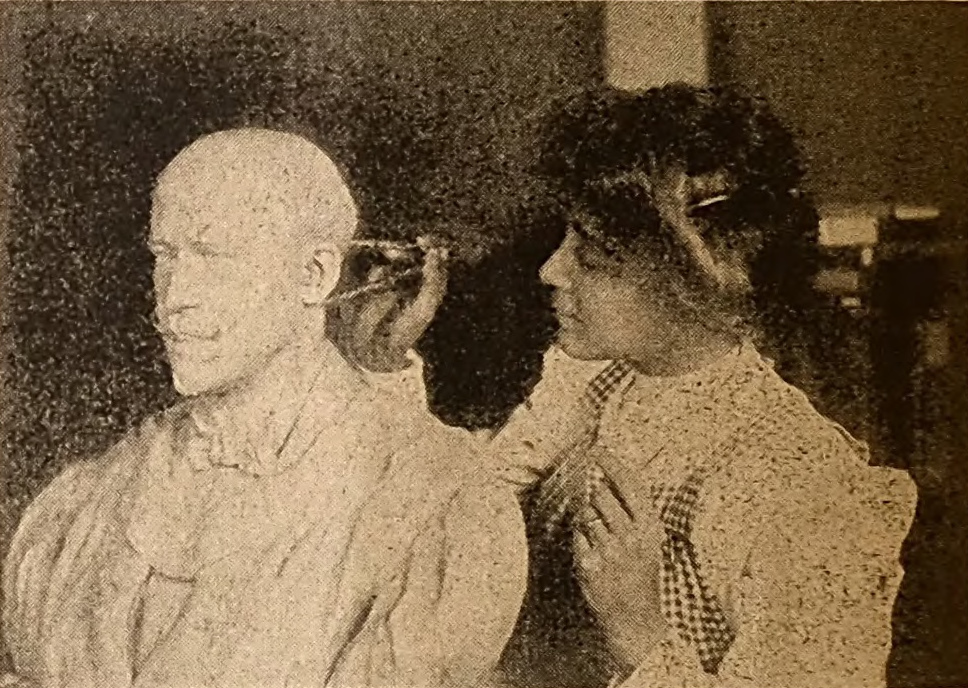
Jackson working on a bust of W. E. B. Du Bois

After Jackson's move to Washington, "she had expected to continue her studies at the art school connected with the Corcoran Art Gallery but was refused admission because of her color," a rejection that, for a time, discouraged her from pursuing public work in her field. She would later maintain that "It was chiefly through Dr. Du Bois's influence and urging that she again took up her work with the determination to make the most of her gifts for the encouragement it would be to her people."

Du Bois not only personally encouraged her, but used her images to illustrate The Crisis, his newly established journal and, from 1910, the official magazine of the NAACP.

With this support, Jackson became "the first to break away from academic cosmopolitanism to frank and deliberate racialism" in her artwork. This determination is evident from her best known surviving pieces: the dignified portrait busts she created of the period's black leaders "decent portraits of decent men", and her intimate family groupings of mothers—mixed race themselves—caressing children—their own children—of mixed racial heritage. For the next two decades, these works would be the headliners of her exhibited work.

Jackson arranged for Dr. Du Bois to sit for her in 1907. Although the in-person sessions were discontinued before her portrait bust was finished, Du Bois arranged for photographs to be sent from New York so she could bring the piece to successful completion. Last, and perhaps most helpfully, Du Bois published news of her exhibitions and work in the pages of The Crisis, through to 1931 and the artist's early death.

=== Public exhibitions ===
==== Washington gallery scene ====
In 1912, her portrait bust of Du Bois, among other works, was exhibited at the Veerhoff Gallery in Washington. She received a positive review from The Washington Star commending the work's structure: "the expression is vital and good, the turn of surface, the intimation of mobility are well rendered." The Star, reviewing her bust of Assistant Attorney General WIlliam H. Lewis, later that same fall, took the compliment further, "A portrait to deserve the name must be more than a likeness; it must interpret character; it must have personality. Of this bust as much can truly be said."

Exhibiting a broader collection of sculptures at the Veerhoff in 1916, her Star review was again effusive: Jackson's "work has always shown promise, but these pieces now on exhibit indicate exceptional gift, for they are not merely well modeled, but individual and significant".

As a woman defined by the color of her skin, finding public venues to display her work was a constant challenge. "It is not at all customary for Washington art stores to exhibit the works of colored artists," a contemporary reviewer observed, "particularly if the subjects are too colored, and the fact that Mrs. Jackson's work has been displayed, is evidence of her talent."

In 1917, Jackson exhibited at the Corcoran Gallery in Washington, from whose art school, she had been rejected, on a racial basis, on her arrival in DC fifteen years before. The event was written up in a brief newspaper piece ("First Recognition for the Race") that ran in papers across the United States as widespread as Omaha and Salt Lake City. "What is said to be the first recognition of colored talent by that institution is the exhibition in Corcoran Art Gallery, at Washington, D.C. of a child's head modeled by Mrs. May Howard Jackson."

And then—the National Academy of Design, New York (1919))

==== Segregated exhibitions ====
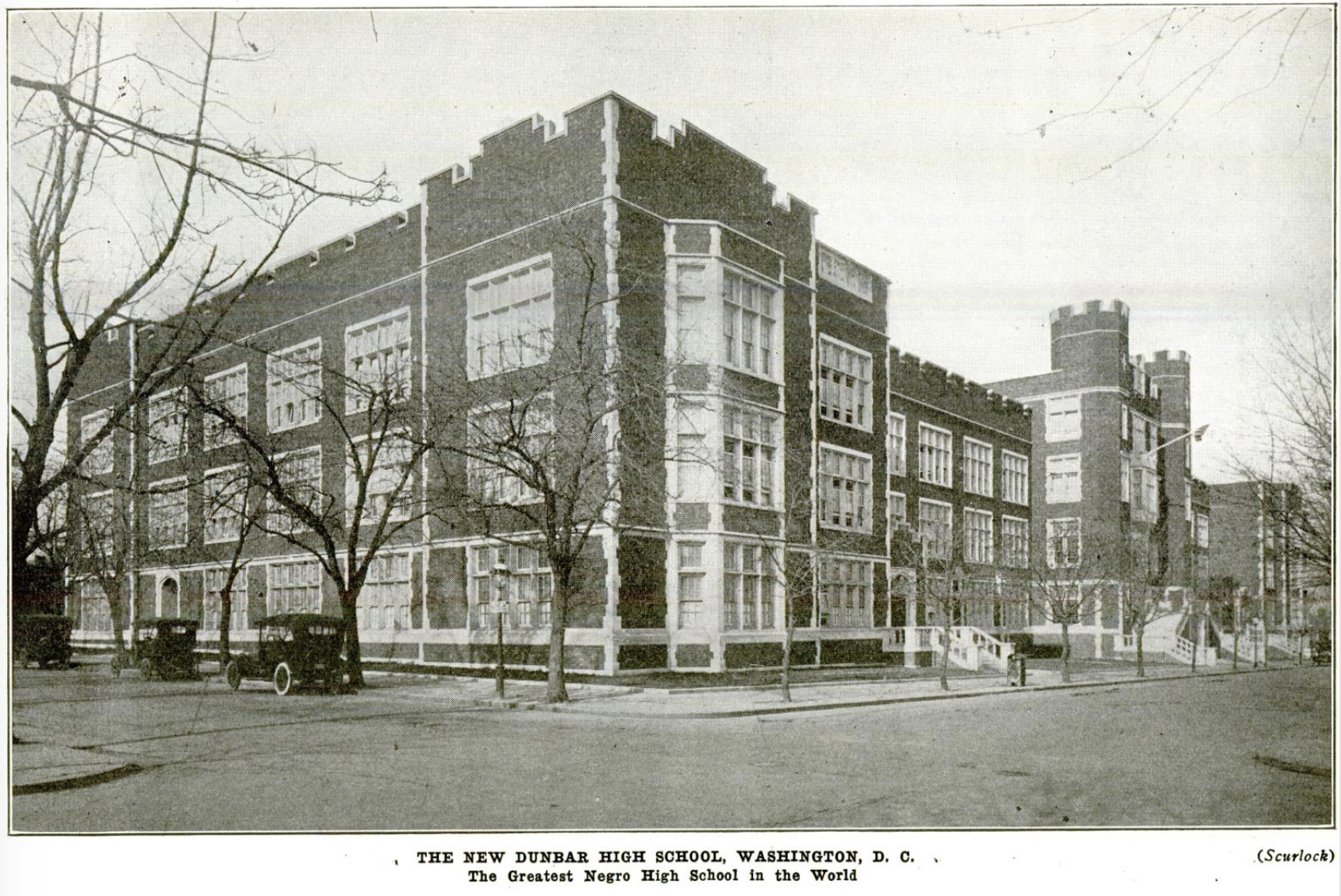
New Dunbar High School Building, 1917. "The Greatest Negro High School in the World"

Artists like Jackson responded to the lack of gallery support by pressing alternative public spaces into service, such as the "War Service and Recreation Center" of the Washington Y.M.C.A., where, in May 1919, a solo "exhibition of 25 sculptures of May Howard Johnson" was held.

The M Street High School moved to new buildings and was renamed Dunbar School in 1916 for the noted African-American intellectual and poet, Paul Laurence Dunbar (d. 1906) (Jackson would complete a portrait in his honor, a casting of which, in bronze, would become the property of the school). The school's expansion brought new ambitions. Dunbar formed the Tanner Art League in 1919, and an attempt was made to institute an annual show for colored artists. The first show displayed the work of artists from fifteen states and included pieces from Laura Wheeler, Julian Abele, Meta Warrick Fuller, and recent work from Jackson ("a bust and statuette"). The Dunbar's 1922 show included works by William Edouard Scott and William McKnight Farrow, as well as the inaugural D.C. showing of Jackson's sculpture, The Brotherhood, which had "had a prominent place in a recent exhibition of the Society of Independent Sculptors at the Waldorf Astoria," along with others of her work.

=== Teaching ===
In Washington, Jackson maintained a sculpture studio in her home. Aside from portrait sculpting, she continued to teach, with two years at Howard University as an art instructor for Howard's newly implemented School of art (1922–1924). At the university she taught and influenced James Porter, who went on to write one of the first comprehensive histories of African-American art. As an art historian, though, Porter was not impressed by her work and said that there was "no great originality in any of the pieces she attempted."

=== Recognition ===
With legal racial segregation in force across the South since the turn of the century, topics such as racial mixing were taboo in general. Laws against miscegenation had been proposed in both federal and state legislatures as far North as Massachusetts after Democrat Woodrow Wilson was elected as president in 1912.

Her work was recognized with a Harmon Foundation Award in 1928. Five works were exhibited in the subsequent Harmon show, two featuring as illustration in the exhibition catalogue ("Bust of Dean Kelly Miller" and "Head of a Negro Child"). Leslie King-Hammond, an art historian, later praised Jackson's "efforts to address...without compromise and without sentimentality, the issues of race and class, especially as they affected mulattos".

Despite this recognition, Jackson was dissatisfied with her progress. 1929 she wrote, "I felt no satisfaction! Only deep sense of injustice, something that has followed me and my efforts all my life."

== Race ==
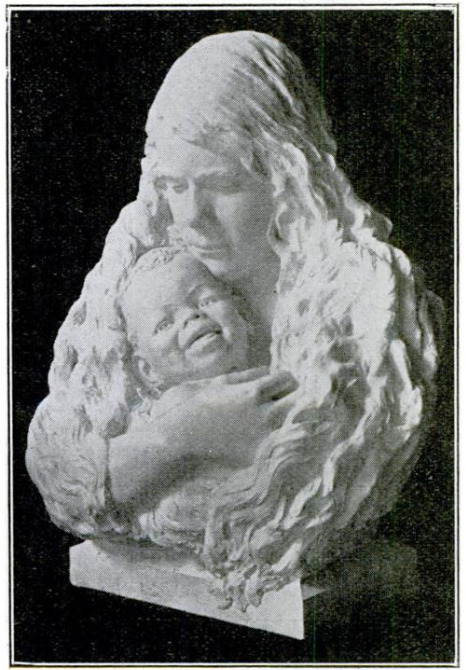
May Howard Jackson, Portrait of Mother and Child | Mulatto Mother and her Child (~1916)

Jackson could "pass" for Caucasian, but the racial politics of the early 20th century created an environment that pushed her in a different direction. She cooperated with pioneering African American anthropologist Caroline Bond Day, providing details (including photos) regarding the Howard family's racial background that would later be published in Day's 1932 Harvard University Master's thesis, ""A Study of Some Negro-White Families in the United States" (the year following Jackson's death)

Her personal experiences of racism were ongoing through her life and sour: whether her initial rejection from Corcoran Gallery or her experience with the National Academy of Design. After showings in 1916 and 1918, the academy sent a representative to Jackson's home to ask if she was of "Negro blood"—and, on receiving an affirmative response, subsequently excluded her work from future exhibits.

Jackson expressed a fascination with the wide variety of phenotypes among African Americans. This was expressed in "Shell-Baby in Bronze" (1914), "Head of a Negro Child" (1916), and "Mulatto Mother and Child" (1929) - the last piece in particular also an address of her own racial identity and "near Whiteness". These three pieces define her most original surviving work.

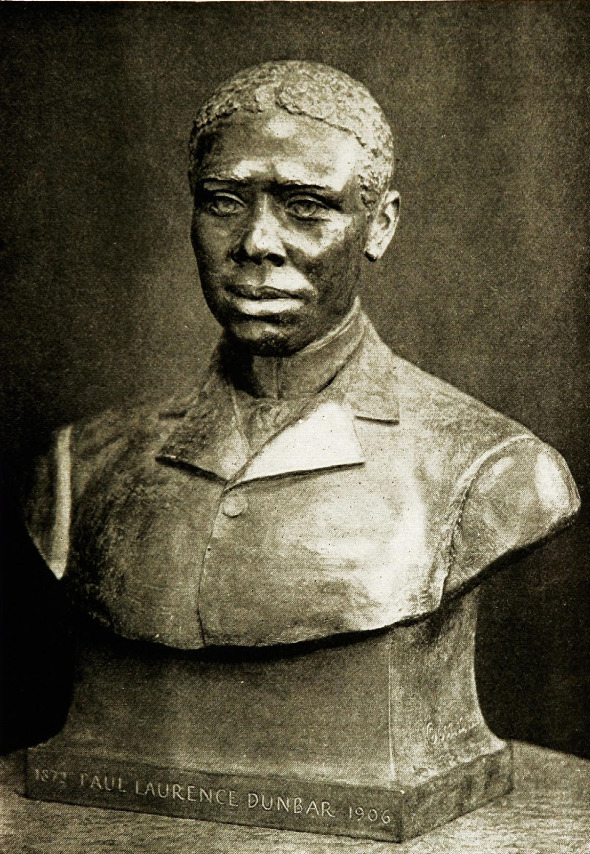
May Howard Jackson, Portrait of Paul Laurence Dunbar, bronze (1918)

Her style was provocative for its time because it explored the features of America's multiracial society. As a result of not traveling in Europe, Jackson was somewhat isolated from her peers and was able to create her own vision that infused her work with a unique style. This style was ignored at first because it was so different from the popular style of the time. Though she had developed her own unique style, this style still adhered to academic tradition. Many galleries were not interested in her subject matter, as she dedicated most of her work to objective portraits of children, family members, and influential African Americans. It was not until the inauguration of the Harmon Foundation Awards, in 1926, for "Distinguished Negro Contributions," that there was even a National prize for Black Artists.

Jackson's racial identity was questioned after her death. While many may have questioned her racial identity it definitely became clear as she was listed as one of the colored women in the March 13, 1913 woman's suffrage parade.

== Final years ==
The Harmon Foundation exhibits, intended to showcase the works of Black female artists in America, virtually coincided with events of the Great Depression. The period's dream of the "New Negro Woman," lost its focus, and Jackson's death, in 1931, brought a period of obscurity during which crucial early cataloguing of her work was neglected. Her "sensitive and humanistic approach to the portrayal of Black Folk types," was in some ways anathema to certain "Black art critics and historians," uncomfortable with its portrayal of racial ambiguity in a period when the "near-white" were granted privilege unavailable to the darker-skinned.

== Legacy ==
Jackson and her husband took in William's nephew Sargent Claude Johnson at age fifteen, following his parents' deaths (father, 1897, mother 1902). Johnson was one of six siblings, several of whom chose to live as white in their adulthood. Johnson, who went on to become a well-known sculptor of the Harlem Renaissance himself, was first exposed to sculpture through his aunt's work and studio.

Jackson died in the year 1931, and is buried at the Woodlawn Cemetery in the Bronx, New York City. Du Bois memorialized her death in his closing notes to the October 1931 issue of The Crisis: "With her sensitive soul, she needed encouragement and contacts and delicate appreciation. Instead of this, she ran into the shadows of the Color Line... In the case of May Howard Jackson the contradictions and idiotic ramifications of the Color Line tore her soul asunder."

Francis T. Moseley was among the first to recognize the complex "daringly ventured to express in her work something of the social situation."

Jackson's contributions to American art were not widely appreciated until after her death, and a conclusive assessment of her work among "the Pantheon of great American Sculptors" remains to be determined. The African American Registry places her in the "annals of great American sculptors."

She was an artist who pushed the boundaries of her time, unique in the body of her work and vision. Her "completely American" training, initially derided as a lost opportunity to study with European masters, is now seen as an element vital to her status as a woman, if not a sculptor, of "intense and lucid temperament."

== Exhibitions ==
=== Public exhibits ===
- The Veerhoff Gallery, Washington D.C. (1912, 1916)
- The New York Emancipation Exhibition (1913)
- The Corcoran Art Gallery (1915)
- The National Academy of Design (1916)
- May Howard Jackson: 25 Sculptures. War Service and Recreation Center, Y.M.C.A., Washington, D.C. (May 1919)
- Exhibit of Fine Arts by American Negro Artists, The Harmon Foundation, International House, New York (1929)
- An Exhibition of Paintings and Sculpture by American Negro Artists at the National Gallery of Art (1929)

=== Posthumous group ===
- 3 Generations of African American Women Sculptors: A Study in Paradox (1996) Afro-American Historical and Cultural Museum, Philadelphia

== Catalogued work ==
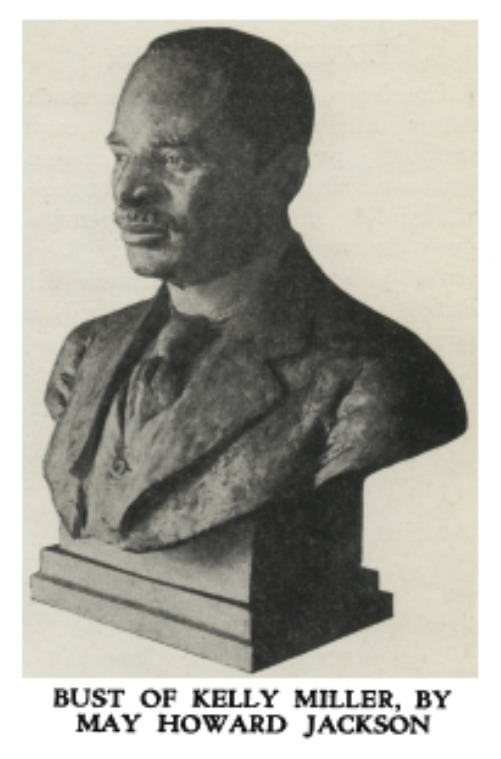
May Howard Jackson, Bust of Kelly Miller, Dean, Howard University, College of Arts & Sciences, bronze (~1912)

- Slave boy / Portrait Bust of an African (1899) bronze, Kinsey Family Collection
- Portrait Bust of Paul Lawrence Dunbar (Dunbar High School, Washington D.C.).
- Massachusetts Senator George Frisbie Hoar (1906)
- Portrait Bust of W. E. B. Du Bois (1912)
- Assistant Attorney General WIlliam H. Lewis (1912)
- Morris Heights, New York City (1912) oil on linen, Pennsylvania Academy of Fine Arts
- Portrait Bust of Dean Kelly Miller (1914) bronze, Howard University)
- Shell-baby, bronze (1915, exhibited 1929)
- Head of a Negro Child (1916).
- William H. Lewis (bef 1919)
- William Stanley Braitewait (bef 1919)
- Portrait Bust of Reverend Francis J. Grimke (1922)
- Suffer Little Children to Come Unto Me (n.d.)
- Bust of a Young Woman (n.d., plaster, held by Howard University)
- Mulatto Mother and her Child / Mother and Child, plaster ((exhibited 1918)
- William Tecumsah Sherman Jackson (exhibited 1929)
- Negro Dancing Girl (exhibited 1929)
- Resurrection, exhibited 1929)

== Awards ==
- Harmon Foundation Award in the Fine Arts (1928) Bronze Medal

== See also ==
- African American firsts
