= Southern Regional Council =

Racial equality organization

- Founded: 1944
- Founder: Howard W. Odum
- Type: Non-profit organization
- Purpose: Racial integration, Race relations, and Desegregation
- Location: Atlanta, Georgia
- Origins: Commission on Interracial Cooperation
- Region served: Southern United States
- Method: Philanthropy and Communications
- Key people: Lillian Smith

The Southern Regional Council (SRC) is a reform-oriented organization created in 1944 to avoid racial violence and promote racial equality in the Southern United States. Voter registration and political-awareness campaigns are used toward this end. The SRC evolved in 1944 from the Commission on Interracial Cooperation. It is headquartered in Atlanta, Georgia.

== History ==
The Commission on Interracial Cooperation (CIC) was formed in 1919. The CIC formed in response to the increased tensions between white Americans and black soldiers returning from fighting in Europe after World War I. Although most African Americans still lived in the South, the Great Migration had started to the North and Midwestern industrial cities, and thousands of blacks were living in new urban environments. They often had to compete with immigrants and ethnic whites for jobs and housing. In the summer of 1919, race riots erupted in numerous major cities as whites attacked blacks. African-American veterans and others resisted being treated as second-class citizens and fought back, especially in Chicago and Washington, DC, during what has been called "Red Summer" because of the widespread violence. Black veterans in the South were confronted with expectations they would submit to Jim Crow laws, and lynchings of black men rose after the war, including of some veterans in uniform.

During World War II, members of the CIC realized that the same problem could recur during and following that war. In 1943, leaders from the CIC, including sociologist Howard W. Odum, held a series of conferences in Durham, North Carolina; Richmond, Virginia; and Atlanta, Georgia. As a result, they formed the Southern Regional Council (SRC), with Odum selected as its leader. The CIC was disbanded, essentially being merged with the new SRC in 1944. The SRC was formed "to attain through research and action the ideals and practices of equal opportunity for all peoples of the region."

The SRC urged whites, particularly those with more liberal political attitudes, to help black people obtain equal rights. Like the CIC before it, the SRC was a coalition of lawyers, Christian ministers, and newspaper editors from thirteen southern states. Although the group was bi-racial and included both men and women, the majority of its members were white.

Initially, Odum sought to bring about racial equality in the Southern US by improving economic, social and political conditions. The SRC avoided taking a public stand against legal segregation, on the belief that this would hinder progress toward its economic planning goals. Critics of this approach, such as activist author Lillian Smith, believed that the SRC should condemn the state-imposed legal segregation. In 1949 the SRC declared in a resolution that segregation "in and of itself constitutes discrimination and inequality of treatment." As a result, many whites left the SRC, resulting in a decline of membership by almost half by 1954.

== Activities ==
Often partners with other groups involved in the civil rights movement, the SRC used communications and analysis to try to reach people through facts and education. It published literature related to racial justice, released studies on race relations, and acted as a think tank for issues concerning the movement.

=== Publications ===
Since 1944, the SRC has published some form of journal. The Council's first publication, Southern Frontier, had been published by the Commission on Interracial Cooperation from January 1940 until February 1944. The SRC continued publishing Southern Frontier from March 1944 to December 1945 before reformatting and renaming the publication as New South. In 1974, New South and a companion tabloid South Today were merged into a color glossy magazine, Southern Voices. This published for ten months but ceased because of financial issues.

The SRC journal Southern Changes was published between 1978 and 2003. Emory University, in partnership with the Library of Congress, has digitally preserved the journal, described as "an alternative and groundbreaking news outlet for stories on social justice in the South."

The Council publishes various issues briefs, position papers, and legislative reviews, including the annuals Southern States Legislative Review and State of the South Report.

=== Voter Education Project ===
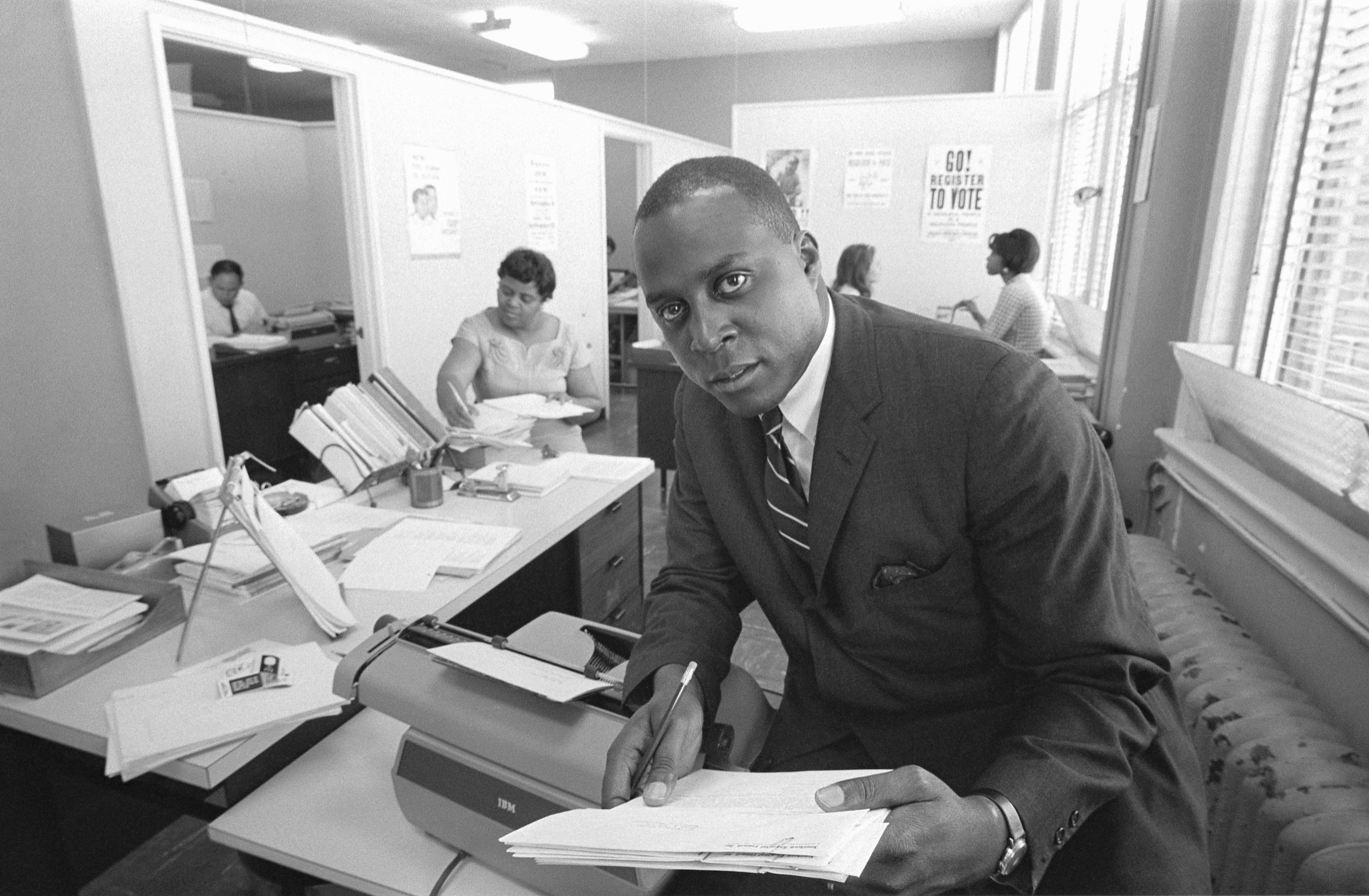
Vernon Jordan working on a voter education project at the Southern Regional Council in 1967.

The SRC served as a liaison between a number of southern organizations and northern foundations, providing resources and opportunities for mutual understanding. The organization created the Voter Education Project (VEP), building on an idea from U.S. Attorney General Robert F. Kennedy during the Kennedy administration; the project was run by the SRC from its inception on April 1, 1962, until it was made an independent organization on June 1, 1971. The VEP did not actually register voters; instead, it acted as a conduit between philanthropic grants and civil rights organizations conducting voter registration drives or voting-related research. For example, the VEP funded voter-registration work by the National Urban League; in October 1962, the Jefferson County (Alabama) Voters Campaign received assistance with a registration effort from the League.

=== Lillian Smith Book Award ===
The Lillian Smith Book Award was established by the SRC in 1968, shortly after writer Lillian Smith died, to "recognize authors whose writing extends the legacy of this outspoken writer, educator and social critic who challenged her fellow Southerners and all Americans on issues of social and racial justice."
