= Albert Alexander Smith =

American artist

Albert Alexander Smith (September 17, 1896 – April 3, 1940) was an American artist, illustrator, and jazz musician. According to Theresa Leininger-Miller he was an "internationally renowned artist" throughout the 1920s and 1930s.

Smith was born on September 17, 1896, in New York City and grew up in the city's San Juan Hill community. An only child, he was born to Elizabeth A. Smith, a homemaker, and Albert Renford Smith, a chauffeur for Ralph Pulitzer. Both of his parents were immigrants from Bermuda. In 1911, he graduated from Public School No. 70. He then went on to study at DeWitt Clinton High School, attending the school for two years. In 1913, he switched schools after receiving a Wolfe scholarship to attend the Ethical Culture School. There, he studied art under Irene Weir.

In 1915, Smith began attending the National Academy of Design, becoming the school's first African-American student. At the Academy, he won multiple awards, including the Snydum medal in 1917, the Chaloner prize in 1919, and the Tanner Gold medal in 1919. In 1917, during World War I, Smith enlisted in the army's 807 Pioneer Band. He served for two and half months overseas with the American Expeditionary Forces, and was honorably discharged in July 1919. After his discharge, he returned to his studies at the National Academy of Design.

In June 1920, Smith moved to Paris and began living abroad. He played as a musician with different bands, mostly at night, and created various art pieces of tourist locations and scenes. He traveled to Italy in 1922, where he studied the artworks of Italian old masters and continued to perform as a musician. Around that time, he made art focused on Black people and their achievements, as well as works about United States racial discrimination. In 1923, he began to study printmaking at the Académie des Beaux-Arts in Liège, Belgium.

He received a Harmon Award (List of winners of the William E. Harmon Foundation Award for Distinguished Achievement Among Negroes).

Smith died on April 3, 1940, in Paris, France, at the age of 44. His works are held at various museums and collections, including at the National Portrait Gallery, the Whitney Museum of American Art, and the Melvin Holmes Collection of African American Art.
