= John Wesley Hardrick =

American painter (1891–1968)

- Born: September 21, 1891; Indiana, US
- Died: October 18, 1968 (aged 77)
- Resting place: Crown Hill Cemetery, Indianapolis, Indiana, US
- Education: Herron School of Art
- Known for: Murals
- Notable work: Little Brown Girl, Lady X
- Spouse: Georgia Anna Howard

John Wesley Hardrick (September 21, 1891 – October 18, 1968) was an American artist. He painted landscapes, still lifes and portraits.

== Early life and family origins ==
Hardrick's grandfather, Shephard Hardrick, was a land-owning farmer in Kentucky who fled to Indianapolis with his family in 1871 due to activities of The Night Riders, a forerunner of the Ku Klux Klan. Hardrick's parents were Shephard Hardrick Jr., and Georgia Etta West, who were married on October 10, 1888 and lived on South Prospect Street in Indianapolis, Indiana. He displayed artistic talent as a young man, learning to paint with watercolors at the age of eight without instruction. As a young teen, he studied with Otto Stark at Manual High School which is now used as offices by Eli Lilly and Company. He entered drawings at the Indiana State Fair while in high school, winning several awards. At the age of nineteen, he entered fifty-three paintings and drawings, receiving eight awards which included several first prizes. This gave Hardrick sufficient notoriety that he began to receive a formal art education after enrolling in October, 1910 in the Herron School of Art in Indianapolis, studying there with William Forsyth until 1918. In order to finance his education, Hardrick worked at the Indianapolis Stove Foundry and sold newspapers.

He married Georgia Anna Howard in 1914. They had children, Rowena, Raphael, Georgia, and Rachel.

== Career ==
By 1917, Hardrick's local reputation was such that he and William Edouard Scott were featured in the Tenth Annual Exhibition of Works by Indiana Artists at the Herron School of Art, both men receiving critical praise. By 1924, he and Hale Woodruff shared a studio at 542½ Indiana Avenue. Unfortunately, his financial situation was such that by 1925 he was working in the family trucking business and had started a carpet cleaning business to help support his family, but despite these time constraints he still found time to paint. Commenting on a 1927 exhibition at the Pettis Gallery in Indianapolis, one review stated that his work had seemed to grow and mature in those two years. That same year Hardrick and Woodruff were among those featured at the Art Institute of Chicago's exhibition of African-American artists. In addition, that year he received a $100 honorarium and second-place bronze medal from the Harmon Foundation. It was presented to him by mayor Ert Slack during a ceremony which honored the achievements of local African-Americans as part of the city's sixth annual Inter-Racial Sunday. This led to a fund drive to purchase one of his best-known paintings, Little Brown Girl.

The Great Depression came just when it seemed Hardrick was poised to reap the rewards for his work and dedication. Hardrick continued to paint and exhibit. On December 18, 1933, Hardrick applied for a Civil Works Administration Public Works of Art Project program and was selected for the project planning committee.

In 1934, he was awarded a commission from the WPA to paint a mural for Crispus Attucks High School. The mural, titled Workers, portrayed 3 African-American foundry workers pouring molten metal, a subject Hardrick would have been familiar with due to his own work in a foundry. It was presented to the high school principal Russell Lane, who refused to install the mural due to its depiction of the laborers and his concern that it would dampen student aspirations.

By 1940 Hardrick's declining health prevented him from working in the family business and he began driving a taxi. He would often sell paintings out of the trunk and, while driving around, see a subject he would ask to paint. If a man or woman agreed, he would drive them to his studio and complete the portrait in a few hours.

In 1941, his wife Georgia died and Hardrick moved to his parents' house on Prospect Street with three of his children, Raphael, Georgia, and Rachel. He used the attic for a studio. By 1943 his daughters had married and he left. In 1946, his friends Rufus and Emily Wharton offered him their basement as a studio and residence, which he accepted. He continued to paint until unable due to advancing Parkinson's disease. When he died on October 18, 1968, he was a nationally recognized artist in spite of living his whole life in Indianapolis.

== Art ==
Hardrick's first exhibition was in 1904 at the age of 13 at the Negro Business League convention and he also exhibited his work in 1904 at the Indiana State Fair.

His first major exhibition was at Allen Chapel, A.M.E. Church in 1914. In 1928 he also painted a mural at the African Methodist Episcopal Church in Indianapolis entitled "Christ and the Samaritan Woman at the Well."

Hardrick's work was showcased at the 10th Annual Exhibition of Works by Indiana Artists in 1917. Hale Woodruff and Hardrick shared a studio for a time in the 1920s at 541 Indiana Avenue and in 1927 exhibited together at the Art Institute of Chicago. In 1927, Hardrick received a Bronze Award from the Harmon foundation for his painting, Portrait of a Young Girl. Beginning in 1928, Hardrick received grants from the Harmon Foundation for 5 years. His art was included in the Second Annual Exhibition of Contemporary Negro Art in San Diego, California in 1929. Also in 1929, his work was displayed at the Smithsonian Institution. He and worked as a Works Progress Administration muralist in 1933–34. In 1933 he received a blue ribbon at the Indiana State Fair for his portrait Mammy.

His work was also displayed in the Hoosier Salon at Marshall Field Art Gallery in Chicago, Illinois in 1929, 1931, and 1934.

From July 4-September 2, 1940, Hardrick's work was included as part of the Exhibition of the Art of the American Negro (1851–1940) in the Tanner Art Galleries in Chicago, Illinois.

Hardrick's works include certain holdings at the Indianapolis Museum of Art including: Little Brown Girl, created in 1927 (which was purchased by Indianapolis African-American citizens and donated to the IMA in 1929, and re-acquired in 1993). Winter Landscape, created in 1945 and Untitled Landscape

Hardrick's art is also owned by the Indiana State Museum. It was exhibited February 1-March 16, 1977 as part of the Woodruff, Hardrick, and Scott exhibition. It was also exhibited earlier, on March 23-April 4, 1929 as part of the Exhibition of Fine Art by Negro Artists.

Certain of Hardrick's works are lost, including Lady X and murals painted for a WPA commission for local Indianapolis schools. The story of the loss of Lady X reveals the strained finances of Hardrick in 1933. The Harmon Foundation had been exhibiting the piece and returned it to Hardrick via Railway Express. The artist was unable to pay the freight charges to retrieve the work, and records of its present location are unavailable.

== Memorial ==
John Wesley Hardrick is buried in Crown Hill Cemetery in Indianapolis, Indiana.

A building on the campus of Indianapolis University - Purdue University Indianapolis (IUPUI) is also named after the artist.

=== Workers mural re-imagined ===
In 2021 Norwood, a historic neighborhood where Hardrick and his family once own land, was slated for a project where a morgue and forensics facilities would be constructed on land once owned by John Hardrick. Though opposition from Norwood residents the plan for the morgue and forensics facilities was cancelled and in its place a plan for a public park replaced it. Within this park, a community center would be built and a mural would be created by Kaila Austin which would re-imagine Hardrick's Workers which was created in 1934 for the Crispus Attucks High School that was never installed and has since been lost.

== Important events in the life of John Wesley Hardrick ==
1891	Born
1904	First Exhibition
1910	Enrolls in Herron School of Art
1914	Married and major exhibition at Allen Chapel, A.M.E. Church
1917	featured in the Tenth Annual Exhibition of Works by Indiana Artists
1927	exhibited at the Art Institute of Chicago and Little Brown Girl created
1928	Mural created at African Methodist Episcopal Church in Indianapolis entitled "Christ and the Samaritan Woman at the Well."
1929	art displayed in the Hoosier Salon at Marshall Field Art Gallery in Chicago, Illinois and Little Brown Girl purchased by Indianapolis African-American citizens and donated to IMA
1933	selected for the project planning committee for the WPA
1941	his wife, Georgia, dies and leaves Hardrick a widower after more than 25 years of marriage.
1945	Winter Landscape created
1968	Died
