= Kaila Austin =

American artist

- Education: Indiana University
- Occupations: Visual artist, public historian, and activist

Kaila Austin is an American interdisciplinary visual artist, public historian, and community activist in Indianapolis, Indiana. Austin's works has been featured in exhibitions and installations at Big Car Collaborative, BUTTER Fine Art Fair, and Herron School of Art & Design.

== Early life and education ==
Austin started in the fine arts program at Ivy Tech and then transferred to Indiana University. In 2017, Austin graduated from Indiana University with a degree in art history.

== Career ==
Austin works primarily as a painter, muralist, bookbinder, and collage artist. In 2019, Austin founded and serves as the executive director of Rogue Preservation Services LLC, which is a consulting firm that primarily serves Black communities to protect their ancestral spaces.

In 2022, Austin received a Power Plant Grant for her project Reimagining the Hardrick Home: Public Art as Heritage Preservation to replicate a mural by John Welsey Hardrick for the Pride Park in Norwood.

In October 2023, Austin had a solo exhibition titled Process as Practice: Reimagining the Lost Hardrick Mural at the Tube Factory Artspace. This exhibition featured work by Austin highlighting her time spent with the descendants of the United States Colored Troops, Norwood residents, and the descendants of John Welsey Hardrick and her process with recreating the lost Worker mural by Hardrick.

== Selected exhibitions ==
- Saints & Icons. Harrison Center for the Arts. Indianapolis, Indiana. 2021.
- BUTTER Fine Art Fair. GANGGANG. Indianapolis, Indiana. 2022.
- Past Is Present: Black Artists Respond to the Complicated Histories of Slavery. Herron School of Art & Design. Indianapolis, Indiana. September 2022-January 2023.

== Awards ==
In 2023, Austin was announced as a recipient of an ARTI Award presented by the Indianapolis Arts Council.
