= John Claybrook =

John C. Claybrook (June 11, 1872 – July 21, 1951) was a logger, farmer and businessman in the United States. He owned property in Arkansas. He owned a semi-professional baseball team and developed Claybrook, Arkansas.

He was born in Florence, Alabama. He received a William E. Harmon Foundation Award for Distinguished Achievement Among Negroes.

He cut timber, acquired land, grew cotton, and developed a timber industry town of Topaz into what became known as Claybrook with a boarding house and mill. Ernie Pyle wrote a column about him in the Memphis Commercial Appeal June 18, 1936 (republished in 1947 in Pyle's Home Country. His semi-professional baseball team the Claybrook Tigers played in the Negro Southern League, winning a couple of championships with Ted Radcliffe.

He married, became a widower, remarried, and had a son John Claybrook Jr. and three daughters with his second wife Emma G. Claybrook.

He retired to his home in Memphis and is buried at Elmwood Cemetery (Birmingham, Alabama).

The documentary film Swingin' Timber by David D. Dawson was made about him and his baseball team.
