= Will W. Alexander =

First president of Dillard University (1884–1956)

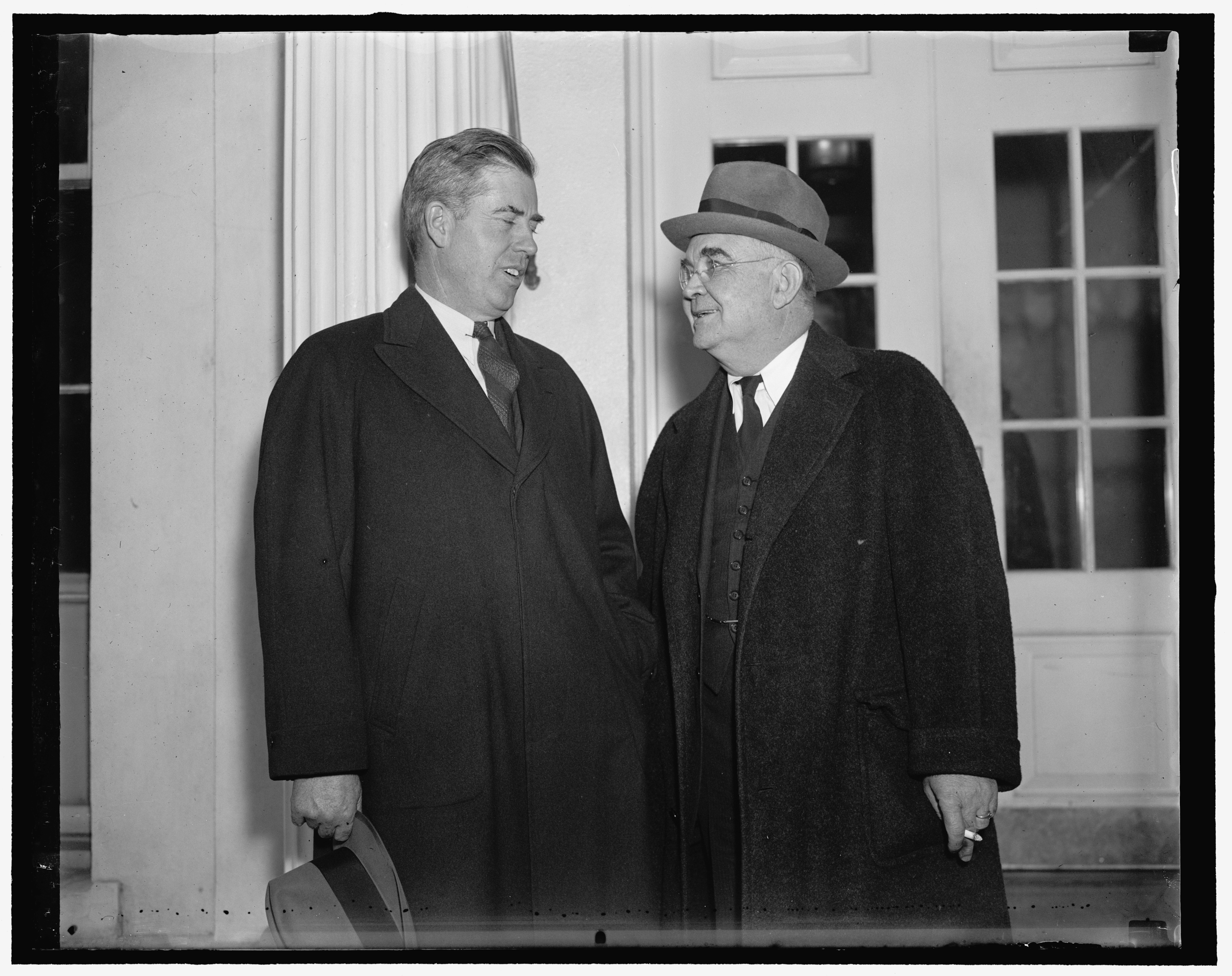
Will W. Alexander (right) with Henry A. Wallace in 1936, after Alexander's appointment to head the Resettlement Administration

Will Winton Alexander (1884–1956) was chief executive officer of the Commission on Interracial Cooperation (CIC) as well as the first president of Dillard University.

== Early life and education ==
Alexander was born in Marrisville, Missouri in 1884. He attended Vanderbilt University.

== Career ==
He served as Executive Secretary Army Y.M.C.A. Southeastern Military Department from 1917 to 1919.

He served as the Executive Director of the Commission on Interracial Cooperation from 1919 to 1930.

Alexander originally had no desire to become a college president; he was deeply committed to the CIC. However, he was persuaded to become acting president "during the preliminary stages of its development", and served in 1935–36. In 1926 he was the first ever winner of the prestigious Gold medal for distinguished achievements in race relations of the Harmon Foundation awards.
