= Albon Holsey =

American businessman and advocate

Albon L. Holsey (May 31, 1883 – January 16, 1950) was an American businessman and advocate for African American businesses. He served as executive secretary of the National Negro Business League. He received a William E. Harmon Foundation Award for Distinguished Achievement Among Negroes.

His parents were Albon Chase Holsey and Sallie Thomas Holsey. He attended the Knox Institute in Athens, Georgia and Atlanta University in Atlanta, Georgia.

He served as executive secretary for Robert R. Moton of Tuskegee Institute who was president of the National Negro Business League.

Holsey was born in Athens, Georgia on May 31, 1883. He married Basiline Boyd on October 3, 1906. He worked at Tuskegee Institute for 37 years from 1914. He received the Harmon Award for achievements in business in 1950. He died in Tuskegee, Alabama on January 16, 1950.

He spoke in support of businesses owned by African Americans, encouraging patronage at them. He wrote about the personal aspects of discrimination against African Americans including from when they are children.

He is buried in Tuskegee.
