= Samuel Wilson Rutherford =

- Born: September 15, 1866; Clayton County, Georgia (U.S. state)
- Died: January 18, 1952 (aged 85); Washington DC, United States
- Occupation: Business man
- Known for: African-American pioneer in insurance
- Spouse(s): Mary Lemon (1883–1897), Florie Simpson (-1949)
- Awards: Harmon award

Samuel Wilson Rutherford (September 15, 1866 – January 18, 1952) was an American businessman who founded the National Benefit Insurance Company in Washington, D.C. In 1927, he won the first award and gold medal of the Harmon award, for "his sound management and leadership of his company, which was developed from a small sick benefit association with capital stock in 1898 of $3,000 to a legal reserve life insurance company with $75,000,000 in policies in force."
