= Lacey Kirk Williams =

African-American Baptist official

Lacey Kirk Williams (July 11, 1871, Eufaula, Alabama - October 29, 1940) was an African-American who served as President of the National Baptist Convention from 1922 to 1940 and as Vice President of the World Baptist Alliance between 1928 and 1940. He died in an aeroplane crash in 1940.

Williams was born in 1871 on the Shorter Plantation near Eufaula, Alabama, to Levi and Elizabeth Williams, who had formerly been enslaved. The family migrated to Texas in 1878.

After being educated at Bishop College in Texas and Arkansas Baptist College, he was ordained to the ministry in 1894 at the Thankful Baptist Church in Pitt Bridge, Texas. In 1910 he became pastor of the Mt. Gilead Baptist Church in Fort Worth.

In 1916 he became pastor of the Mt. Olivet Baptist Church in Chicago. The church grew rapidly over the next decade due to the growing population of African Americans migrating from the South during and after World War I, as well as Williams' dynamic, activist style that appealed to many of the new arrivals. The church grew to become the largest African American church in Chicago and one of the largest in the United States.

In 1919 he was appointed to the Chicago Commission on Race Relations.

In 1922 he assumed the presidency of the National Baptist Convention. Under his leadership, the National Baptist Convention established an interracial alliance, which Williams called a "cooperative," with the American Baptists, a white denomination, that contributed greatly to the growth of the National Baptist Convention and to the black community as a whole. The success of the denomination led to his appointment as Vice President of the World Baptist Alliance in 1928. He continued to serve as president of the National Baptist Convention until his death.

Williams died in a plane crash on October 29, 1940. Williams was heading to a Republican rally for Wendell Willkie in Flint alongside fellow minister William Haynes when the charter plane they were travelling on crashed near Olivet, Michigan.
