= William E. Harmon =

American developer and philanthropist

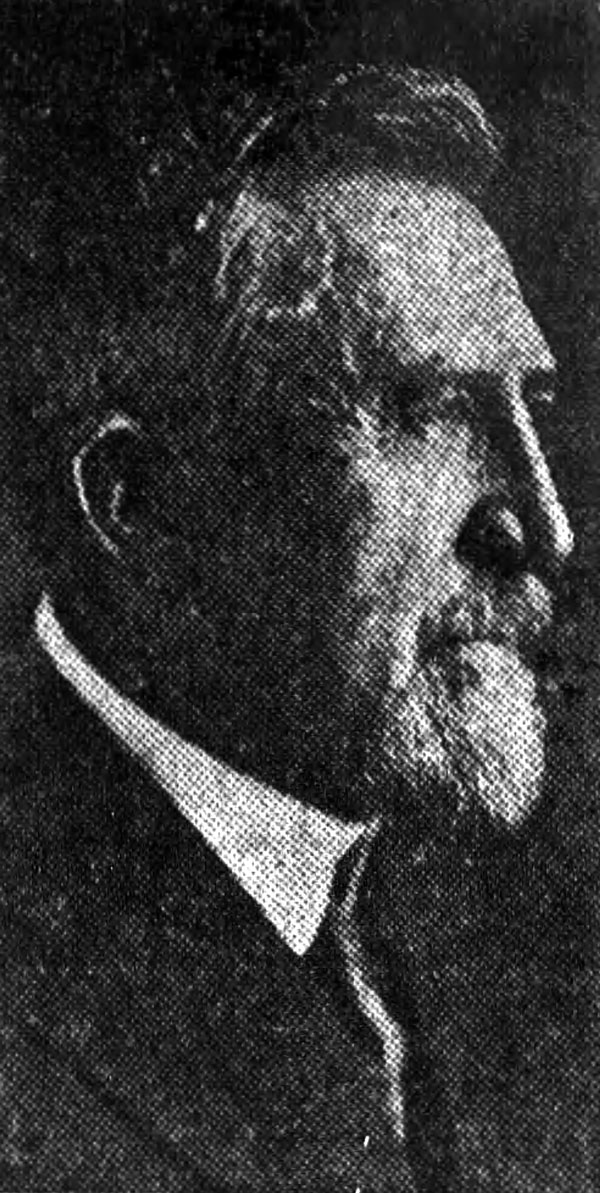
William E. Harmon

William Elmer Harmon (March 25, 1862–July 15, 1928), also known as Jedediah Tingle (cited in some sources as Jebediah Tingle), was a white real estate developer and philanthropist. He founded the William E. Harmon Foundation, which was noted for its support of African-American artists.

== Early life ==
Harmon was born in Ohio and raised in the Midwest; his father was an officer in the 10th Cavalry Regiment. When he was six years old, he and his mother joined their father living in Native American territory.

== Career ==
In 1887, Harmon approached his younger brother, Clifford B. Harmon, and their uncle Charles Wood with a business proposition. William felt that there was money to be made by providing a way by which people interested in owning a home could purchase one in installments, making a small down payment and paying what they could monthly. This "Easy Pay Plan" opened the possibility of home and land ownership to large groups who might not otherwise be able to do so. Clifford and his uncle both liked the idea; together they pooled $3000 to start Wood, Harmon & Co.

Their first development was near Loveland, Ohio. With some advertising, the development of over 200 lots sold quickly. Further developments were soon built in Ohio and western Pennsylvania, followed by expansion into various cities in the Midwest and the East Coast of the United States. Wood, Harmon & Co. soon had offices in over 26 cities.

In 1900 Wood, Harmon & Co, purchased large tracts of land in Brooklyn, New York, in anticipation that the building of the Brooklyn Bridge and expansion of the city's rail transit would provide opportunities for the company. This action proved to be fortuitous, with the company ultimately developing over 20,000 building lots in Brooklyn. Wood, Harmon & Co. diversified by creating other companies to acquire and hold business properties and real estate for lease and/or sale. In 1907, William took his partners to court over Clifford and Wood having set up further businesses using the corporate name without his involvement, leading to the dissolution of the company.

== Foundation and Jedediah Tingle ==
The William E. Harmon Foundation, which Harmon established in 1921, originally supported a variety of causes. They spent hundreds of thousands of dollars establishing over 100 "Harmon Fields" playgrounds in locations in 24 different states. They also provided college loans for poor individuals and fund nursing programs, but is best known for having funded and collected the work of a large group of African-American artists, many of whom would go on to become widely recognized.

Harmon also had an alter ego, Jedediah Tingle (or Jebediah Tingle, depending on the source). Under that name, he dispersed money for less focused and more frivolous or impulsive purposes. Tingle's agents would bestow funds and treats on children, artists, and poets. For example, "Tingle" funded giving dollar bills to reward young camp-goers for their skill in holding their noses while underwater. One recipient was awarded for not appearing in public in Abraham Lincoln makeup during the run of a play. Tingle's true identity was not publicly known until after Harmon's death.

== Death ==
Harmon died July 15, 1928, in Southport, Connecticut, after years of illness. At his death, he still had US$2,000,000. A Charlotte, North Carolina public librarian who had received annual gifts from "Jebediah Tingle" sought out other Tingle recipients with the goal of holding a memorial.
