= Janie Porter Barrett =

American social reformer, educator and welfare worker

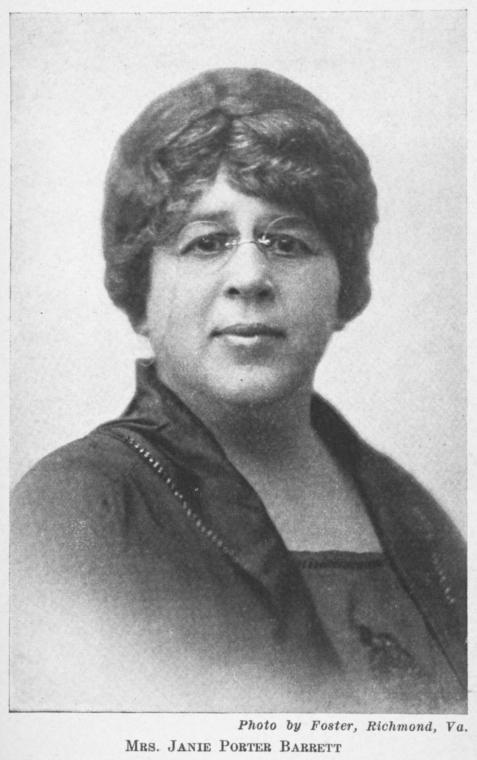
- Barrett, c. 1922
- Born: Janie Porter; August 9, 1865; Athens, Georgia, U.S.
- Died: August 27, 1948 (aged 83); Hampton, Virginia, U.S.
- Education: Hampton Institute
- Occupations: Educator, Activist
- Known for: founder of the Virginia State Federation of Colored Women's Clubs
- Spouse: Harris Barrett (m. 1889)

Janie Porter Barrett (née Porter; August 9, 1865 – August 27, 1948) was an American social reformer, educator and welfare worker. She established the Virginia Industrial School for Colored Girls, a pioneering rehabilitation center for African-American female "delinquents". She was also the founder of the Virginia State Federation of Colored Women's Clubs.

== Early life ==
Barrett was born in Athens, Georgia, on August 9, 1865. Her mother Julia was a former slave. Barrett's father's name is unknown; however, he is thought to have been Caucasian because of Barrett's fair skin.

The Skinners, a Caucasian family, hired Barrett's mother as a live-in housekeeper and seamstress. The Skinners pampered Barrett and educated her along with their own children. As well as receiving an education in literature and mathematics, Barrett was exposed to privileged and refined people. Her childhood was atypical of the African-American community of the time.

Barrett's mother married a railway worker and lived with him while still working for the Skinners, but Barrett continued to live with the Skinners. Mrs. Skinner wanted to become her legal guardian so that she could send Barrett to a school in the northern U.S.A., where Barrett could live as a white person. Julia vetoed this plan and sent Barrett to the Hampton Institute in Hampton, Virginia, where she would live as a black person in a black environment.

Barrett had never lived among African-Americans before attending Hampton Institute. She also had to do manual labor for the first time at the institute. Hampton emphasized vocational education, and women were trained in morality and housekeeping in preparation for careers as wives or domestics. Barrett gradually adapted to the system at the institute, and she was especially influenced by a novel about a cultured and advantaged woman similar to herself who devoted her life to social service. While at Hampton, she began to volunteer for community projects that helped people. Barrett trained as an elementary school teacher at the institute. The Institute taught her lessons "in love of race, love of fellow-men, and love of country", inculcating her with altruistic and patriotic values, and a sense of duty towards her race.

== Career ==
Barrett graduated from the Hampton Institute in 1885. She worked as a teacher in a rural school in Dawson, Georgia, and then at Lucy Craft Laney's Haines Normal and Industrial Institute in Augusta, Georgia. She taught night school classes in the Hampton Institute from 1886 to 1889. In 1889, she married Harris Barrett, the institute's cashier and bookkeeper. They had four children.

=== Locust Street Social Settlement ===
Soon after she married, Barrett began holding an informal day care and sewing class at her home in Hampton. The class grew rapidly into a club that tried to improve both home and community life. It was formally organized as the Locust Street Social Settlement in October 1890. It was the first settlement organization for African Americans in the USA.

In 1902, the Barretts built a separate structure on their property to house the Settlement's numerous activities, which included clubs, recreation, and classes in domestic skills. They received assistance from Hampton Institute students and faculty, who also found several philanthropists — who were mostly from the northern U.S.A. — to fund the settlement. By 1909 the settlement had clubs for children, women, and senior citizens. Committees supervised these clubs, and Barrett concentrated her efforts on large-scale annual events.

=== Virginia Industrial School for Colored Girls ===
In 1908 Barrett helped to organize, and was the first president of, the Virginia State Federation of Colored Women's Clubs. The Federation engaged in a wide range of social services. It helped in the provision of environments that were appropriate for children, rather than their being placed in institutions like jails and almshouses.

For several years after 1911, the Federation gradually raised money for the establishment of a residential industrial school for the large number of young African-American girls that were being sent to jail. They planned to pay in full for land after five years of fundraising. However, in 1914, Barrett read in a newspaper that an eight-year-old girl had been sentenced to six months in jail, and she immediately appealed to the judge in Newport News, Virginia, to send the girl to the Weaver Orphan Home in Hampton, where Barrett was living at the time. The judge reluctantly released the child into her care. The Federation quickly raised $5,300 and bought a 147-acre (0.59 km^{2}) farm in Hanover County, Virginia, and chartered their center.

The center was a rehabilitation center for African-American female juvenile delinquents and was called the Industrial Home for Wayward Girls. It opened in January 1915 with 28 students. After several name changes, the center became known as the Virginia Industrial School for Colored Girls. With advice from many prominent social workers and especially from the Russell Sage Foundation, the school developed a program that stressed self-reliance and self-discipline. The school had academic and vocational instruction, visible rewards, "big sister" guidance, and close attention to individual needs.

In 1915 and 1916, the Virginia Assembly appropriated more funds for the school, and Barrett was named secretary of the board of trustees. Harris Barrett died at about this time. Barrett also turned down a job offer as dean of women at Tuskegee Institute. She became superintendent at the Industrial School. One of her fellow trustees at the school was suffragist and activist Mary-Cooke Branch Munford, who had assisted in its creation.

Barrett was deeply involved in every aspect of the Industrial School's program. She personally managed the parole system, by which girls who demonstrated sufficient responsibility were placed in carefully selected foster homes. These girls also were given jobs and were supported by follow-up services such as ministerial guidance, a newsletter called The Booster and personal letters. The school operated on an honor system and did not use corporal punishment. A special feature of Barrett's work was that each resident had their own bank account, so that upon discharge each resident had some money to take with them.

Barrett excelled in her role at the school. Her childhood had equipped her to deal with the socially important white women who controlled the trustee board and who were able to influence state legislators to appropriate funds for the school. She said: "You know we cannot do the best social welfare work unless, as in this school, the two races undertake it together." She was held in such a high regard that she could demand that the future Caucasian employers of her students treated them humanely.

While the Industrial School was under Barrett's supervision in the early 1920s, the Russell Sage Foundation rated it as one of the five best schools of its kind in the USA. At the time, its enrolment was about 100. The school became a model of its type, with many successful rehabilitations of young women who were able to find employment and get married after being released. The school was known especially for its cultivation of character and morals.

In 1920, the state of Virginia assumed financial responsibility for the school. The state and the Federation shared the supervision of the school until 1942, when it became supervised by the Virginia Department of Welfare and Institutions alone.

=== Further achievements ===
In 1929, Barrett received the William E. Harmon Award for Distinguished Achievement among Negroes. In 1930, she took part in the White House Conference on Child Health and Protection. She served as the president of the Virginia State Federation of Colored Women's Clubs for twenty-five years. She chaired the executive board of the National Association of Colored Women for four years.

== Death and legacy ==
Barrett retired in 1940. She died in Hampton on August 27, 1948.

In 1950, Barrett's training school was renamed the Janie Porter Barrett School for Girls. It became racially integrated in 1965. The Virginia Industrial School existed as the Barrett Learning Center until 2005.

Barrett's image was included in the 1945 painting Women Builders by William H. Johnson as part of his Fighters for Freedom series.
