= Commission on Interracial Cooperation =

American civil rights organization

The Commission on Interracial Cooperation (1918–1944) was an organization founded in Atlanta, Georgia, December 18, 1918, and officially incorporated in 1929. Will W. Alexander, pastor of a local white Methodist church, was head of the organization. It was formed in the aftermath of violent race riots that occurred in 1917 in several southern cities. In 1944, it merged with the Southern Regional Council.

== History ==
In spite of its official "interracial" title, the commission was formed primarily by liberal white Southern Methodists. The organization grew mainly out of the Atlanta Christian Council and the YMCA War Work Council. It was formed in response to the increasing unrest amongst black Americans during the post World War I period. According to internal documents the CIC believed that WWI had "changed the whole status of race relationships," and that blacks had grown resolved to obtain "things hitherto not hoped for".

They identified three types of Southern Blacks—leaders who were "openly rebellious, defiant and contemptuous", leaders who were "thoughtful educated Negro leaders", and the "great mass of uneducated Negroes". They wanted to increase the popularity of the "thoughtful" leaders who advocated for "patience" by reducing some of the most aggravating features of white supremacy.

The organization worked to oppose lynching, mob violence, and peonage and to educate white southerners concerning the worst aspects of racial abuse. The key leaders of the commission included Tuskegee Institute president Robert R. Moton, New York investment banker George Foster Peabody, Virginia governor Harry F. Byrd, Wake Forest College president William Louis Poteat, and Georgia industrialist John J. Eagan. Belle Harris Bennett, leader of the Southern Methodist Women's Missionary Council, created the CIC's Woman's Work Department after being inspired by the annual meeting of the National Association of Colored Women. The CIC established thousands of Black schools in the South using the Rosenwald Fund, and contributed to New Orleans' Dillard University.

The commission was based in Atlanta but had other committees throughout the South. By the 1920s there were some eight hundred local interracial committees associated with this commission. The Commission did some prominent work in modifying racial contacts by preventing race riots and providing the African American population of the South with schools. However, the commission did not directly address segregation and its sociological results.

== Results and final years ==
Before the Commission was created, there were 83 lynchings; ten years later (1929) this number dropped to ten. Through the work of this commission, African Americans and whites had meetings to confer about African Americans' problems, a gradually increasing group on both sides learned the goals and sympathies of each other. In 1930, financial troubles attributable to the Great Depression led the commission leaders to rethink the programs that were in effect. They chose to abandon much of their fieldwork to concentrate more heavily on research. In 1944, a number of conferences led to the establishment of the Southern Regional Council. Many interracial movement leaders agreed that the Commission on Interracial Cooperation programs were out of date, and they supported the commission's merger with the Southern Regional Council. The Commission on Interracial Cooperation had clearly helped prepare the South to enter a new phase in the movement towards racial justice in the United States.

== Sources ==
- Edward Flud Burrows, "The Commission on Interracial Cooperation, 1919–1944: A Case Study in the History of the Interracial Movement in the South," (PhD. diss., University of Wisconsin-Madison, 1954).
- Commission on Interracial Cooperation in The New Georgia Encyclopedia
