= John Manuel Gandy =

Black educator

- Born: John Mumphis Gandy; October 31, 1870; Oktibbeha County, Mississippi, US
- Died: October 5, 1947 (aged 76)

Academic background
- Education: Jackson College; Fisk University (BA, MA); Illinois Wesleyan University (PhD)

John Manuel Gandy (October 31, 1870 – October 5, 1947) was an educator, advocate, and the third president of Virginia State College. He became the president in 1914 when the school was known as Virginia Normal and Collegiate Institute, replacing James Hugo Johnston. While president of what is now Virginia State University, he also served as president of the Association of Negro Land Grant Colleges, president of the Virginia State Teachers' Association, and president of the National Association of Teachers in Colored Schools.

== Personal life ==
John M. Gandy was born in Oktibbeha County, Mississippi to Horace and Mary Goodwin Gandy. His parents were freed slaves and tenant farmers. His paternal grandfather, Ed Gandy, had emigrated to the United States from Ireland.

While on the faculty at Virginia Normal and Collegiate Institute, Gandy married Carrie Senora Brown. They had four children, of which three survived: Theodore, Marian, and John, Jr. Gandy died of natural causes in 1947 and was buried in Blandford Cemetery.
