= William Edouard Scott =

American painter

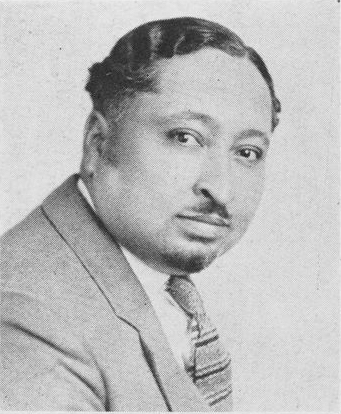
- Born: March 11, 1884; Indianapolis, Indiana
- Died: 15 May 1964 (aged 79–80); Chicago, Illinois
- Education: Herron School of Art and Design, School of the Art Institute of Chicago, Académie Julian, Académie Colarossi
- Known for: Painting
- Notable work: Night Turtle Fishing in Haiti, Haitian Market, Douglass Appealing to President Lincoln
- Patrons: Rosenwald Fund

William Edouard Scott (March 11, 1884 – May 15, 1964) was an Afro-Indigenous American artist. Before Alain Locke asked African Americans to create and portray the New Negro that would thrust them into the future, artists like William Edouard Scott were depicting blacks in new ways to break away from the subjugating images of the past. Scott, well known for his portraits, Haitian scenes, and murals, challenged the standard depiction of blacks in art in the first half of the 20th century by utilizing black subject matter in an uplifting way. However, just as his style remained traditional as opposed to abstract, he was relatively conservative in his portrayals of blackness.

== Biography ==
Scott was born in Indianapolis on 11 March 1884 to Edward and Caroline Scott (née Russell). He was the grandson of John Scott and Eliza Locklear, Saponi and Tuscarora migrants who traveled from North Carolina through Ohio to Indiana. They were affiliated with the Saponi Nation of Ohio, whose citizens extend to Saponi and related indigenous peoples who further migrated through the midwest.

After graduating from Manual Training High School in 1903, Scott spent a year studying drawing under Otto Stark. In 1904 he moved to Chicago and attended the School of the Art Institute of Chicago, where he won the Frederick Mangus Brand prize for pictorial composition. During his time in Chicago he painted murals around the city, one of which was Commerce, which is still lauded today as "remarkable". He learned much of his palette and impressionist technique, however, during his travels to France. While abroad he studied at Académie Julian and Académie Colarossi and was mentored by Henry O. Tanner, a famous African-American artist who moved to Paris to avoid racial prejudice against his art. Training in Paris, Scott was able to build a reputation for himself more easily than his race would have allowed in America. Perhaps because of this, he seemed to be more conservative in his portrayals of the "New Negro" than others in the movement, and sometimes painted scenes that had nothing to do with race at all. During the years 1910–14, for example, he occasionally visited his former teacher at the Etaples art colony and while there painted local scenes such as the atmospheric Rainy Night at Étaples and others under Tanner's influence.

After his formal education was complete, Scott received a Rosenwald Foundation grant and traveled to Haiti to paint those who had "maintained their African heritage". Later he traveled to Alabama to study blacks in different communities in the South. By refusing to paint blacks as only slaves and laborers (as so many before him had), Scott hoped to "reverse the stereotypical perceptions of African Americans and eventually foster an understanding among the races". When he returned to Chicago, Scott continued with that goal as he portrayed "blacks on canvas in positions of prominence doing noble deeds" throughout the portraits and murals he created for the rest of his life.

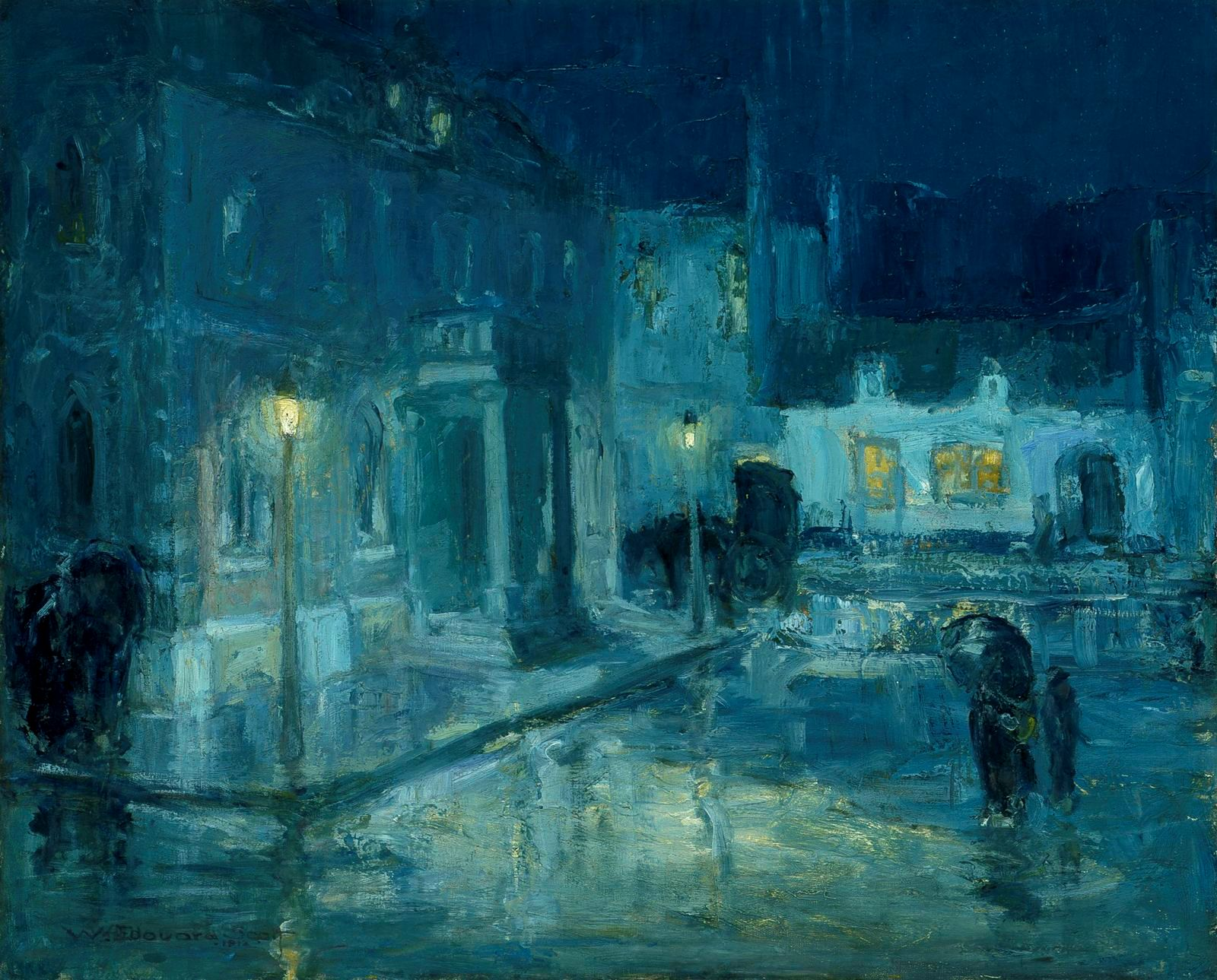
Scott's Rainy Night in the collection of the Indianapolis Museum of Art

== Haitian work ==
In 1931, Scott was awarded the Julius Rosenwald fellowship (Rosenwald Fund) for study in Haiti. During his time in Haiti, Scott truly captured the essence of the society in that nation. One of his more famous paintings from this period is Night Turtle Fishing in Haiti, 1931, which depicts the work of four Haitian men out on the water. Night Turtle Fishing is characterized by the strength of the figures whose labor energizes the work. Scott's work features deep attention paid to the use of light in framing his compositions. Much to that effect, Scott uses the sun in Night Turtle Fishing to center the work and draw the viewer's eye to the fishermen.

The lively markets in Haiti were one of Scott's favorite subjects, and he portrayed such scenes in their marked vitality in Haitian Market, 1950. This painting mimics the crowded nature of Haitian market life. The classical columns in the painting's architectural backdrop add an invocation of splendor to the work. Scott enjoyed the markets of Haiti as they owed well to the completion of his visual project of "types". Scott expressed his desire when visiting Haiti to create types, depictions of various Haitians engaged in labor. Scott also created portraits of types in his efforts to cultivate a series of "50 distinct Negro types." Scott has been since criticized by scholars for the similarity his Haitian types bear to the racial types used by Europeans to justify racist ideologies. Scott's Haitian landscapes have also been criticized for their focus on themes of the virgin, exotic lands rather than any inclusion of Haitian cultural or historical elements. Despite such criticisms, Haitians particularly enjoyed Scott's work. Until Scott's creative journey, Haitians were accustomed primarily to French art. Scott's works during this period showed Haitians that domestic subjects were suitable for painting. At the behest of Haitian president Sténio Vincent, Scott participated in two exhibitions of his art in Haiti during which his work was well received. Through these portrayals of blacks, he worked toward his goal of forging an interracial understanding.

== Portraits and murals of African Americans ==
When Scott returned to the United States, he continued to paint blacks and black subject matter in ways that redefined the image of blacks in art. An example of his positive depictions of members of the black community is his painting Frederick Douglass. In the painting, Douglass is "shown in a pensive profile as if the burden of the world were on his shoulders". And while Scott often uses lighting to highlight some aspect of his work, he uses it here in a rather surprising way. His skin tone, while black enough to look historically accurate, appears paler than would be expected. It looks as if light were shining so directly on the subject that his skin appears lighter—but this is an interesting choice when Douglass's blackness was something that defined him and his actions throughout his life. Choices like that suggest a certain amount of conservatism on Scott's part—even though he is painting a man that did much for the African-American community, his race is far from highlighted. Instead, the key aspects of the painting are Douglass's deep stare and his furrowed brow, which speak much more of his respected status and position of responsibility than of his role as a black man. Furthermore, the setting and his clothing both add to the respectability of Douglass—he appears to be situated in a library, suggesting his education and intelligence, and he is wearing a suit, suggesting his success. As Scott chose to paint this prominent African-American man, he is obviously challenging the definition of "blackness" through his portrayal of a "New Negro" character. However, while Scott is making a rather revolutionary statement by painting this black subject, it is suggested that it is Douglass's character and not his blackness that make him worthy of painting—a tribute to Scott's conflicting conservative and liberal approaches to the race issue.

Frederick Douglass was a recurring figure in works by Scott, and in 1943 Scott was selected as "the only black artist chosen to create a mural for the Recorder of Deeds Building in Washington, D.C." In this mural, Douglass Appealing to President Lincoln, 1943, Scott tells the story of Douglass's appeal for African-American participation in the Union armies in the American Civil War. "Scott, in his manner of depicting the exchange between Lincoln and Douglass, suggests that the fiery orator is here the aggressive speaker. Whereas Douglass, hands extended slightly, shifts his weight forward while speaking to Lincoln, the president appears to avoid looking into Douglass’s eyes and concentrates on listening to his words". Furthermore, the strewn and scattered papers on the desk and around the trashcan suggest urgency and desperation—and this was certainly the case. "The Civil War was proving much more difficult than the Union leadership had expected". And while Douglass presents a possible solution to the president, it is far from ideal in Lincoln's eyes. Many whites of this time didn't believe that African Americans could be effective soldiers. Regardless, Douglass is undeniably the active part of this depiction, which again portrays African Americans as functioning members of society. This portrayal furthers the message inherent in the subject matter: African Americans could be equally as patriotic, and thus equally effective as soldiers, as any whites. Ironically, though—in the same manner as in Frederick Douglass—Douglass's "blackness" is slightly downplayed yet again. Douglass's skin appears barely darker than the shadowed parts of Lincoln's. Thus, this painting serves as another example of Scott's small step, though not a leap, in the direction of the New Negro movement.

William Edouard Scott was a major part of the transition in the depictions of blacks in art. His mentor Tanner did not push the issue of race in his work after realizing that "the European community could not be expected to understand or appreciate a theme that was distinctly American in nature". Scott, on the other hand, was able to do what Tanner did not—he portrayed the "New Negro" for which Alain Locke would call in the 1920s. However, "He nonetheless remained conservative in his treatment of race… He steered clear of the emphatic embrace of black physiognomy". But it was Scott's use of subject matter that was not only positive but also inherently black that was his contribution to the New Negro movement. Through his portraits and murals, in addition to depicting religious and political themes that had nothing to do with race, Scott's works began to cross the racial barrier and forge connections through art to the black community and the history there.

In Chicago's Bronzeville district, Scott painted several prominent and historically important murals at the Wabash YMCA. These murals fell into extremely critical condition with the under funding of the Wabash YMCA. However, when The Renaissance Collaborative restored the Y, the murals were cleaned extensively and restored. They are now considered a part of a Historic Landmark.

However, just as Scott's artistic style remained traditional and based on the impressionist techniques he had initially learned, his approach to race remained somewhat conservative until his death in Chicago in 1964.
