= Pyramid Club (Philadelphia) =

Private social club in Philadelphia, USA

The Pyramid Club
- Formation: November 1937; 89 years ago
- Type: Private Club
- Legal status: Private Social Club
- Purpose: Art gallery, Meeting space
- Location: 1517 Girard Avenue, Philadelphia, Pennsylvania, U.S. (1940–1963)
- Region served: Philadelphia metropolitan area
- Key people: Walter Fitzgerald Jerrick, Lewis Tanner Moore, Humbert Lincoln Howard, and Oscar James Cooper

The Pyramid Club was formed in November 1937 by African-American professionals for the "cultural, civic and social advancement of Negroes in Philadelphia." By the 1950s, it was "Philadelphia's leading African-American social club."

Between 1940 and 1957, the club's building at 1517 Girard Avenue, Philadelphia, PA, was a center for social and cultural life. Because African-Americans were barred from many clubs and restaurants, the Pyramid Club had its own bar and restaurant. It hosted parties, social events, concerts by noted musicians such as Marian Anderson and Duke Ellington, speakers including Martin Luther King Jr. and J. Robert Oppenheimer, and an annual art exhibition (1941–1957) featuring both local and national artists.

The Pyramid Club was the only exhibition space in Philadelphia at the time that was owned, operated and controlled by African-Americans. The club played an important role within the African-American community by connecting artists with middle and upper-class professionals able to support their work.

The Pyramid Club dissolved in 1963. It has been commemorated with a historical marker by the Pennsylvania Historical & Museum Commission.

== Founding ==
Among those instrumental in establishing the Pyramid Club were Woodley Wells, Alton C. Berry, George Drummond, Wilbur Strickland, Lewis Tanner Moore, Scholley Pace Alexander, Oscar James Cooper, Theodore O. Spaulding, Thomas Powell, and Walter Fitzgerald Jerrick. Dr. Walter Fitzgerald Jerrick became president of the club. Its directors included Drs. Harry J. Greene and Charles W. Dorsey and attorney Theodore O. Spaulding.

== Membership ==
According to The Crisis, all members of the Pyramid Club had to be members of the National Association for the Advancement of Colored People (NAACP). Membership in the club cost $120, with monthly dues of $2.40.

At least at first, only men were officially accepted as members in the Pyramid Club. Women, however, were active at an organizational level throughout the club's history. There was an active Ladies’ Auxiliary, a Pyramid Wives Club, and a Women’s Coordinating Committee. Women could sit on the exhibition committee, whose work included the selection of pieces for exhibitions. Works by women were accepted and shown in exhibitions.

== Art exhibitions ==
Between 1941 and 1957, the Pyramid Club held an annual art exhibition which has been described as "one of the pre-eminent black art exhibits in the country". The exhibitions were managed by Humbert Lincoln Howard.

Members of the Pyramid Club worked closely with the Pennsylvania Academy of the Fine Arts (PAFA), with benefits to both communities. Although the express goal of the club was to increase opportunities for African-Americans, exhibitions at the Pyramid Club included supportive white artists as well as African-American artists. The club's art director, Humbert Howard, was widely connected in the art world and preferred to follow an integrationist policy in his selection of works for the club's shows. He believed that choosing works by both white and black artists, based on merit, would expand the show's patronage and ultimately benefit black artists. His strategy was not always popular: in 1949 Howard and an anonymous critic in the Philadelphia Afro-American debated the inclusion of white artists whose works were shown in discriminatory galleries. Artist Julius Bloch refused to show his work at the Philadelphia Sketch Club when it would not include black artists, choosing to show his works at the Pyramid Club instead.

Artists whose works appeared at the Pyramid Club included Morris Blackburn, Julius Thiengen Bloch, Samuel Joseph Brown, Jr., Claude Clark, Beauford Delaney, Joseph Delaney, Allan Randall Freelon, Rex Goreleigh, Humbert Howard, Paul F. Keene Jr., Ralph Taylor (1896–1978), and Dox Thrash.

Although women were not accepted as members, their works were shown in the exhibitions. The exhibition “Fifty Seven Artists,” held February 20 – March 20, 1948 at the Pyramid Club, was dedicated to Laura Wheeler Waring (1887–1948) who had just died. Eleven women artists were listed in the program, which included Selma Burke, Elizabeth Kitchenman Coyne, Hilde Foss, Etelka J. Greenfield, Reba Klein, Naomi Lavin, Maude C. Lewis, Beatrice Claire (or Clare) Overton and Elsie Reber. Edith Townsend Scarlett was Caucasian, and Sarai Sherman was described as Italian-American.

The exhibition "We Speak: Black Artists in Philadelphia, 1920s-1970s", held at the Woodmere Art Museum in January 2016, examined the influence of the Pyramid Club and other Philadelphia institutions on African-American artists.

== Photographs ==
The Pyramid Club and other centers of African-American culture and life in Philadelphia were extensively photographed by photographer John W. Mosley. Mosley worked as the staff photographer for the Pyramid Club for a number of years. He published an annual album of photographs for the club, the Pictorial Album of the Pyramid Club.

The Charles L. Blockson Afro-American Collection at Temple University contains more than 300,000 photographs taken by Mosley. A retrospective of Mosley's work, A Million Faces: The Photography of John W. Mosley, appeared at the Woodmere Art Museum in Philadelphia in 2016.
