= Henry B. Jones =

American visual artist, writer and educator

Henry Bozeman Jones
- Born: March 11, 1887; Philadelphia, Pennsylvania, U.S.
- Died: April 1, 1971 (aged 84); Philadelphia, Pennsylvania, U.S.
- Education: Pennsylvania Academy of the Fine Arts; Philadelphia School of Pedagogy
- Known for: painter, print-maker, writer, educator, illustrator, teacher, athletic coach, school counselor

Henry Bozeman Jones (March 11, 1887 – April 1, 1971) was an African American artist, writer, print-maker, illustrator, teacher, athletic coach and school counselor. He was known primarily for his portraits and landscapes.

== Early life and community involvement ==
Henry Bozeman Jones was born on March 11, 1887, in Philadelphia to Andrew J. and Ada Jones. Bozeman was his mother’s surname. His father was a real state agent. Jones attended Central High School and received a scholarship to the Pennsylvania Academy of the Fine Arts in 1907. He attended the academy from 1908 to 1910, studying under artists Thomas Anshutz, Henry Poore, William Merritt Chase and Hugh Breckenridge. Anshutz chose Jones from among his other students to work with him in his studio.

After graduation, Jones enrolled at the Philadelphia School of Pedagogy, which trained Central graduates to become elementary school teachers. Jones was never able to live off his art alone. He worked at a number of jobs while painting part time - as a shipping clerk, bellboy, porter, cement worker, actor, printer and teacher.

He was referred to as “Hen Jones” by those who knew him well, and was inseparable from his pipe. In a column about versatile men, a Philadelphia Tribune writer noted in 1954 that Jones, then retired, was skilled in building cupboards and cabinets. He was called on often to talk about a variety of subjects. He judged a children’s poster contest for a sorority, spoke on the subject of Black youth at a forum, and using charts, urged a women’s group to "use the brilliant coloring of their race to its best advantage by wearing all shades of red, orange, blue green and brown and by avoiding all tints" in a talk about color harmony and dress.

== Teaching career ==
Jones began working in the Philadelphia School District in 1916, the year he married Bertha Clearance, a teacher. For 25 years, he was a physical education – or “gym” - teacher, first at Logan Elementary School and then at the Walter George Smith school. He was known for counseling students from athletes to musicians to authors to artists. He organized track, basketball, volleyball and tennis teams at both schools. He coached 47 championship teams, and sent groups to the Penn Relays at the University of Pennsylvania. In 1950, the Loganites, an organization of former Logan students, feted him with a banquet and plaque for his contributions. He was so beloved by one former student, a Philadelphia Tribune columnist, that the man started a campaign to hold an annual testimonial in Jones' honor.

Jones was president of the Philadelphia District 2 of the Association of Pennsylvania Teachers, an organization of primarily Black school teachers, and created the cover for its souvenir book when the group met in Philadelphia in 1937. By 1954, he had retired from the school system.

== Artistic career ==
Jones worked in oil, watercolor, pastel, pen and ink and etchings.

He exhibited most often in the 1930s, many times in local shows that included Allan R. Freelon and Laura Wheeler Waring. Both Jones and Freelon mentored Paul F. Keene Jr. as a teenager when he taught art classes at the Wharton Center in North Philadelphia. They were considered the “elder statesmen” of Black artists, and showed up to review and critique Keen's work. Like other Black artists at the time, Jones exhibited sporadically in white galleries. Most shows by Black artists, noted artist and art historian James A. Porter, were in “churches, vestibules and reading rooms in public libraries, YMCA buildings or classrooms of public school buildings.” They were also set up at local YWCAs.

Jones was praised as a “gifted” artist and was singled out in some of those exhibitions. In 1944, Crisis magazine described him as an “accomplished artist in oils as well as a writer” and listed him among Philadelphia’s “preeminent” citizens, along with Freelon, Dox Thrash and author Jessie Redmon Fauset. The arts writer for the Philadelphia Inquirer described him in 1932 as “decidedly gifted.” Thirty years earlier, in 1913, Crisis noted that he was developing a talent as a portrait painter, producing two works of Frederick Douglass.

== Exhibition history ==
Jones was represented in four of the annual exhibits of the Harmon Foundation, which offered a national showcase for Black artists starting in the 1920s. In 1929, he showed “Portrait of the Artist,” which won an honorable mention; “Biddie,” “Moonlight and Houses” and “Guardian of the Wood.” “Moonlight and Houses” and “Guardian of the Wood” were both sold during the initial Harmon showing at the International House in New York before works were sent out on a traveling exhibit. In the stop at the National Art Gallery in Washington in 1929, art critic Leila Mechlin wrote in a review that portraits by Jones, John W. Hardwick and Charles Dawson were “well painted, well constructed, strong, and give indication of good teaching, sound instruction in fundamentals.”

His submissions in the 1930 Harmon show were “Portrait Study,” “Miss Frances Waters,” “Raymond Rourke” and “Banks of Chaloon.” In 1931, Harmon chose “Dream Time,” “Mrs. Potter” and “Slim.” He was represented in a stop on the traveling tour in South Africa in 1931. In 1933, it was “Blues” and “Old Death.” An essay in that year’s catalog mentioned that the 135th Street Library in Harlem had featured Jones’ prints in a solo show.

He exhibited in shows at Warwick Galleries and Print Club in Philadelphia. At the Warwick in 1931, he exhibited an oil and a watercolor. In 1932, “Old Death” was included in an exhibit of landscapes and portraits at Warwick. Rather than trying to explain the piece, a newspaper writer decided to use Jones’ own words:

“The Gulla Negroes of the Carolina coasts have a tale which says that a buzzard alights on the roof of a house in which a person is dying. Just as the man dies the buzzard changes its form to that of a mighty many-hued bird, the little room of death seems without walls and the bird floats in and carries away the shining soul. Only those who are pious and godly may witness this strange departure of the soul.”

At that Warwick show, he also exhibited a study of trees called “Wind Scales,” along with “Jessup Street” and “The Voodoo Tree.” Later that year, he was singled out in a newspaper story for the oil “The Moon was Gracious.” In 1933, Jones was cited for his “distinct flavor and a high charm” in the painting “Respectability,” a “quaint name for a beautiful grouping of simple houses” (Freelon was among the exhibitors). Jones was noted for having the “best ‘idea’ picture” for “'Creation', the Biblical episode concerning the beginning of men and women but treated cosmically, so to speak, as if the event were accompanied by triumphant demonstrations on the part of the then-new nature.” In 1935, his entry was “Night,” which showed the head of a Black woman. In 1936, he contribute an oil painting (Freelon was again an exhibitor).

At the Print Club, he was selected from among artists from across the country in 1936 to participate in a show. “The reverence implicit in Henry B. Jones’ prayerful ‘Evening Rite’ has the simple appeal of the quattrocento,” a newspaper reviewer wrote. In 1935, he was one of 51 Black and white Philadelphia artists in the club’s seventh annual exhibition of prints, and was present again in the ninth exhibition in 1938. In 1940, a reviewer wrote that "Henry B. Jones indulges a bit in symbolism in his well drawn and cut block print 'Encore – Pagan Dance,' its two nude figures on a graveyard’s edge, telling the artist’s story in a fashion not to be misunderstood." In 1943, Jones' print “Another Crucifixion” featured tanks and planes during a time of war.

During an exhibit at the Gallery at the Plainfield Library in New Jersey in 1930, he exhibited "Elizabeth," a "well drawn figure, placed nicely on the canvas with good color in the flesh and gown," a reviewer wrote while also noting that “The Voodoo Tree” "is imaginative in subject, well designed and somewhat dramatic in arrangement of light and dark." At the John Reed Club in Philadelphia in1934, he participated in a show titled "The Social Trend in Art,” which presented artwork "illustrative of the artists’ feelings in respect to certain modern social conditions,” according to a reviewer. Others represented included Freelon, Thomas Hart Benton, Julius Bloch, Francis Criss, José Clemente Orozco, Thrash, Reginald Marsh and Benton Spruance.

Jones was recognized for his vitreographs, or etchings on glass. One reviewer noted that he had become a “specialist” in the medium. He exhibited two of them at the Print Club’s annual exhibit in 1932: “Masharia,” a study of a Black woman, and “Swamp Edge,” which showed his deftness with the medium, a reviewer wrote. At the club’s 1933 show, he exhibited “Elf Night,” and in 1934, “Got a Job.” Also in 1932, he showed a collection of vitreographs at the 135th Street Library show. He also showed them at a 1932 show at Warwick where they were reported to have caused a “sensation.”

In 1937, Jones spent some time in North Carolina and the Bahamas, and when he returned home, his traditionalist style of painting had changed. Two years later, he presented 11 works in oil at the Gallery of American Contemporary Art in Philadelphia from the North Carolina leg of that trip, including “Tired Fields After Rains” and “Sharecropper’s Cabin.” Artist Samuel J. Brown Jr., with whom he also often exhibited, had watercolors in the show.

In 1946, his work was shown in the fifth annual Atlanta University exhibition. He also participated in shows at the Pyramid Club in Philadelphia over several years. In 1948, he wrote the catalog’s foreword titled “The Pyramid Club Recognizes a Necessity.” His entry was a portrait of his son Perry in profile wearing a yellow coat against a soft green background. He also wrote the foreword for the 1949 catalog, noting that the focus that year was on expressionism. Another exhibitor that year was Samuel J. Brown Jr. He participated again in 1947 (along with Freelon) with “The Journey,” and in 1955 in its first annual fall show (its other shows were earlier in the year).

At a show sponsored by the Henry O. Tanner Memorial Fund at Wharton Settlement in Philadelphia in 1946, he donated three works to community groups: “Hollis” to the Children’s Aid Society, “In Contour” to the Galilee Mission and “Here We Go Zoodoe” to Wharton Settlement.

His works were included in a major show in 1989 titled “Against the Odds: African Americans and the Harmon Foundation.” It was first mounted in the Newark Museum of Art and traveled to other cities in the United States.

== As a writer ==
Jones wrote short stories and articles for Liberty, Romance and Opportunity magazines.

Opportunity Magazine/Journal of Negro Life, the official organ of the National Urban League, published several of his short stories during the 1930s. In its September 1931 issue, the magazine published “Root Deena,” which followed an earlier story titled “Case Against God.” In the April 1932 issue, artist/cartoonist E. Simms Campbell illustrated Jones' short story “A Day Off.” In 1933, “Gin and Moonlight” garnered an honorable mention in Opportunity’s annual literary contest. The first installment of the story was published that year. His short story “Cletus” received an honorable mention in the 1934 contest.

Several of his stories were chosen for a list of the best short stories by Edward J. O’Brien, who issued annual anthologies of the best short stories by U.S. writers. In 1932, “Root Deena” and “Day Off” were picked. O’Brien chose “Gin and Moonlight” and “Jungle Blood” for an anthology he compiled in 1935.

Jones’ short short story “No Jury” was published in the Pittsburgh Courier in 1939. He also illustrated and wrote a children’s book that was used in the public schools.

== As an actor ==
A Harmon Foundation catalog from 1931 noted that Jones was an actor. In 1945, he portrayed Crispus Attucks in the series “Within Our Gates” on WFIL in Philadelphia in his radio debut performance. The series, sponsored by the Philadelphia Fellowship Commission, dramatized the lives of important Americans in an effort to combat intolerance and promote equal opportunity.

== As a portrait painter ==
Jones painted a portrait of Dr. Henry McKee Minton, an African American pharmacist who helped found Mercy Hospital for Black people in Philadelphia. The portrait is in the collection of the Mutter Museum in the city. When Jones died, an obituary in the Philadelphia Tribune in 1971 stated that he had also painted a portrait of Dr. Eugene T. Hinson, also a founder of Mercy Hospital, and that both portraits were hanging in the lobby of Mercy-Douglass Hospital. Jones, Freelon, Minton and Hinson were members of the Philadelphia Club, an organization for Black men who were born in Philadelphia. The obituary also mentioned that a portrait he painted of Frederick Douglass was in the Douglass School in Wilmington, DE. In 1913, Crisis magazine stated that he had created two portraits of Douglass. He painted a portrait of the then-publisher of the Philadelphia Tribune, E. Washington Rhodes, in 1957.

== His death ==
Jones died on April 1, 1971, in Ambler, PA, after having lived for four years in a convalescence home.

== Exhibitions ==
- John Herron Art Institute, Indianapolis, IN (Harmon Foundation traveling exhibit), 1929
- Berean School, Philadelphia, 1930
- National Gallery of Art/ United States National Museum (Harmon traveling exhibit), Washington, 1930
- Gallery at Plainfield Library, New Jersey, 1930
- Southwest YWCA, Philadelphia, 1933
- Federated Colored Catholics Convention, Philadelphia, 1934
- John Reed Club, Philadelphia, 1934
- New Jersey State Museum, 1935
- 135th Street Library, Harlem, NY, 1935
- Warwick Galleries, Philadelphia, 1931, 1932, 1933, 1935 1936
- Print Club, Philadelphia, 1935, 1936, 1940, 1943
- Howard High School, Wilmington, DE, 1936
- Frances Harper Branch YWCA, Camden, NJ, 1937
- Church School Institute, Baltimore, 1940
- Philadelphia Art Alliance, 1945, 1946
- Wharton Settlement, Philadelphia, 1946
- Fairview Golf Club (for Les Beaux Arts-Fairview Art Exhibition), 1949
- William Penn Center, Fallsington, PA, 1958
- Newark Museum of Art, “Against the Odds,” (traveling exhibit), 1989
- Gibbes Museum of Art, “Against the Odds,” (traveling exhibit), Charleston, SC, 1990
- Chicago Public Library Cultural Center, “Against the Odds,” (traveling exhibit), 1990

== Selected collections ==
- Metropolitan Museum of Art
- Melvin Holmes Collection of African American Art
- Blanton Museum of Art, Austin, TX
- Philadelphia School District
