= Omega Psi Phi =

Historically African-American fraternity

- ΩΨΦ
- Founded: November 17, 1911; 114 years ago Howard University
- Type: Social
- Affiliation: NPHC
- Status: Active
- Emphasis: African American
- Scope: International
- Motto: "Friendship is Essential to the Soul"
- Pillars: Manhood, Scholarship, Perseverance, and Uplift
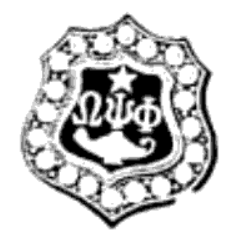
- Member badge
- Colors: Royal purple and Old gold
- Symbol: Lamp
- Publication: Oracle and Clarion Call
- Chapters: 750+
- Members: 250,000+ lifetime
- Nicknames: Omegas, Ques, Que Dogs
- Headquarters: 3951 Snapfinger Parkway; Decatur, Georgia; United States
- Website: Official website

The Alpha chapter of Omega Psi Phi in 1911.

Omega Psi Phi Fraternity, Inc. (ΩΨΦ) is a historically African American fraternity. It was founded on November 17, 1911 at Howard University in Washington, D.C. Omega Psi Phi is a founding member of the National Pan-Hellenic Council. The fraternity has chartered over 750 undergraduate and graduate chapters. Over 250,000 men have been initiated into Omega Psi Phi.

== History ==
Omega Psi Phi fraternity was founded on November 17, 1911, by three Howard University students, Edgar Amos Love, Oscar James Cooper and Frank Coleman, and their faculty adviser, Dr. Ernest Everett Just. It was the first national fraternity to be established at a historically black university. The fraternity's purpose was "to attract and build a strong and effective force of Handsome men dedicated to its Cardinal Principles of manhood, scholarship, perseverance, and uplift".

Omega Psi Phi was incorporated in Washington, D.C., on October 28, 1914. In 1924, at the urging of fraternity member Carter G. Woodson, the fraternity launched Negro History and Literature Week to publicize the growing body of scholarship on African-American history. Encouraged by public interest, the event was renamed Negro Achievement Week in 1925 and given an expanded national presence in 1926 by Woodson's Association for the Study of Negro Life and History as Negro History Week. Expanded to the full month of February from 1976, this event continues today as Black History Month.

In 1930, Omega Psi Phi became one of five founding members of the National Pan-Hellenic Council (NPHC). Today, the NPHC is composed of nine international black Greek-letter sororities and fraternities and promotes interaction through forums, meetings, and other mediums for the exchange of information, and engages in cooperative programming and initiatives through various activities and functions.

Since 1945, the fraternity has undertaken a National Social Action Program to meet the needs of African Americans in the areas of health, housing, civil rights, and education. Omega Psi Phi has been a patron of the United Negro College Fund (UNCF) since 1955, providing an annual gift of $50,000 to the program.

Omega Psi Phi celebrated its centennial during the week of July 27–31, 2011, in Washington, D.C., becoming distinguished as only the third African American collegiate fraternity to reach the century mark. As of 2024, the fraternity has initiated more than 250,000 members and has chartered more than 750 chapters in the United States, Bermuda, Bahamas, Virgin Islands, South Korea, Japan, Liberia, Germany, and Kuwait. Its headquarters are in Decatur, Georgia.

== Symbols and traditions ==
Omega Psi Phi's Cardinal Principles or pillars are Manhood, Scholarship, Perseverance, and Uplift. Its motto is "Friendship is Essential to the Soul". The fraternity's colors are royal purple and old gold. Its symbol is the lamp. Members are called Omegas and Omega Men.

The fraternity's publications are Oracle and Clarion Call.

Like many fraternal organizations, Omega Psi Phi has a rich tradition of practices. While some traditions are secret, many are freely expressed in public. One is the practice of members undergoing branding of the letters, or variations and designs based on them (such as two linked Omega symbols), on their skin. The brands often are displayed in public as a matter of pride; some prospects first learn of the fraternity by seeing members bearing brands. Another unofficial tradition is use of the term Que Dog, although a dog is not the official mascot of the fraternity. However, Omega Psi Phi Fraternity, Inc. "prohibits the promotion of our brand with the affiliation of alcohol; tobacco; references to hazing or items that can be associated with a culture of hazing; items that include any to canine or other animal references.

== Programs ==
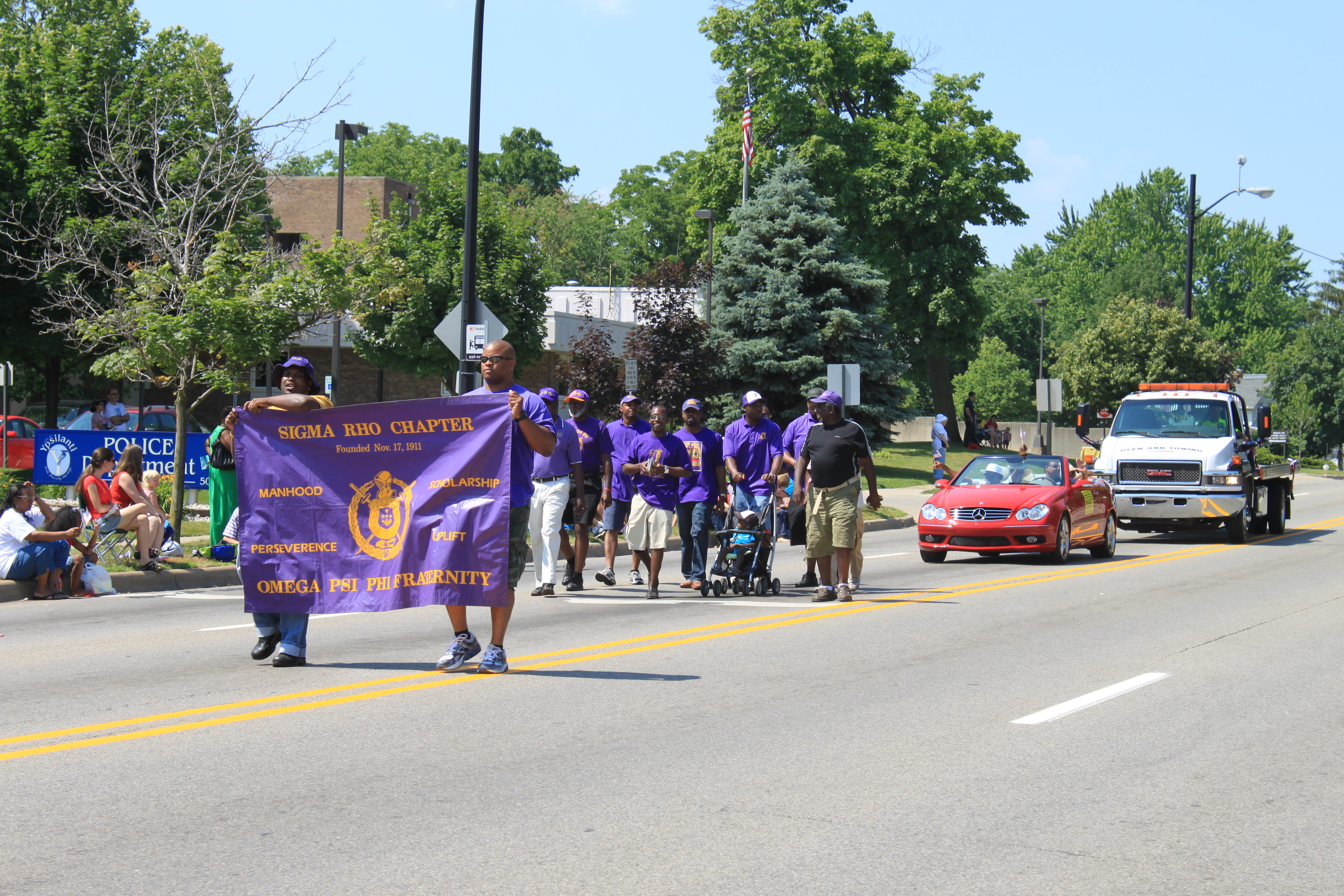
Omega Psi Phi chapter members marching in an Independence Day parade, Ypsilanti, Michigan

Each chapter administers internationally mandated programs every year:

- Achievement Week – A week in November that seeks to recognize individuals who have made notable contributions to society. During the Achievement Week, a High School Essay Contest is held and the winner usually receives a scholarship award.
- Scholarship – The Charles R. Drew Scholarship Program encourages academic progress among the organization's undergraduate members. A portion of the fraternity's budget is designated for the Charles R. Drew Scholarship Commission, which awards scholarships to members and non-members.
- Social Action Programs – All chapters are required to participate in programs that uplift their society. Many participate in activities like voter registration, illiteracy programs, mentoring programs, fundraisers, and charitable organizations such as American Diabetes Association, United Way, and the Sickle Cell Anemia Foundation.

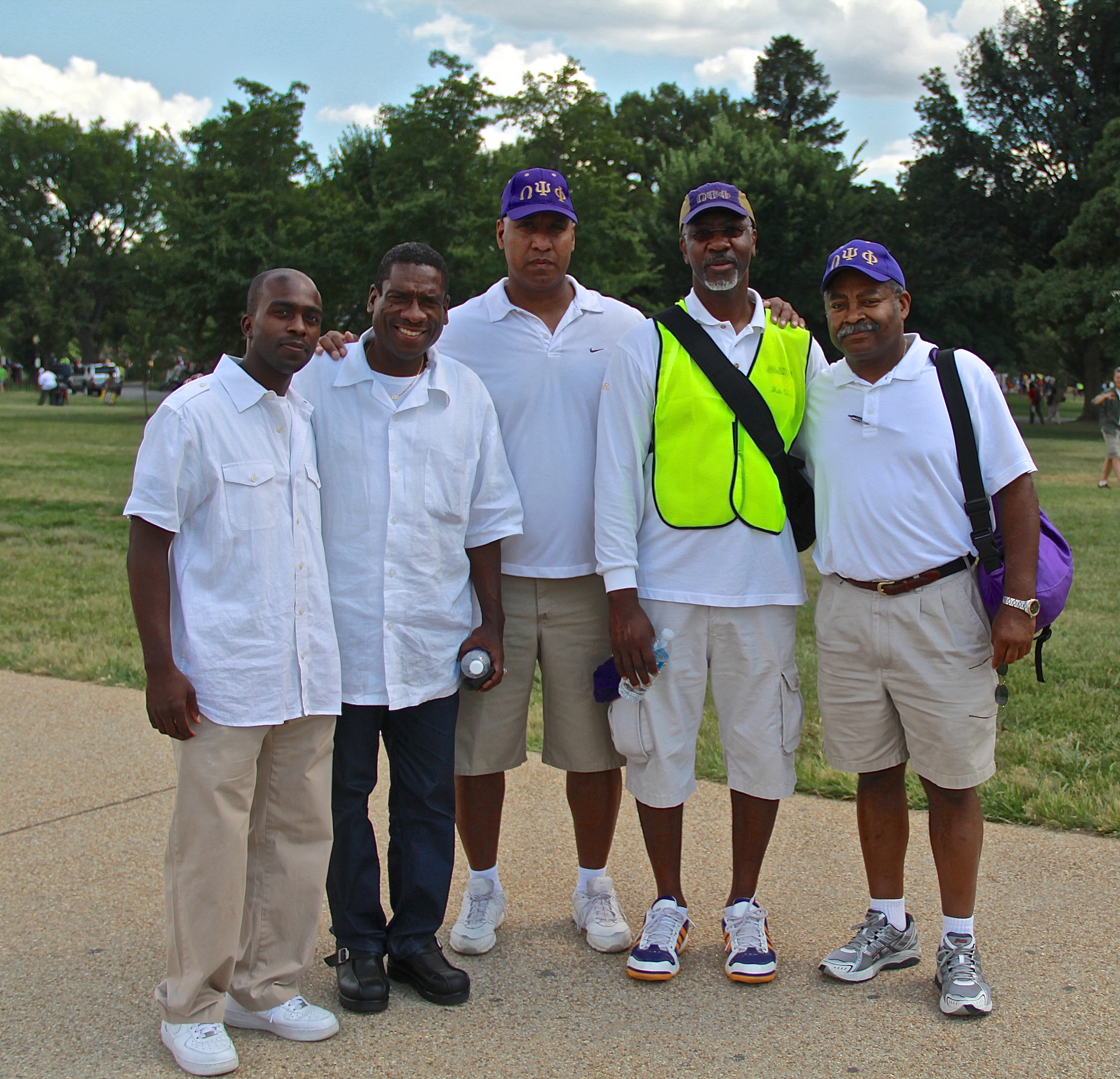
Omega Psi Phi chapter members at the 50th Anniversary of the March on Washington for Jobs and Freedom

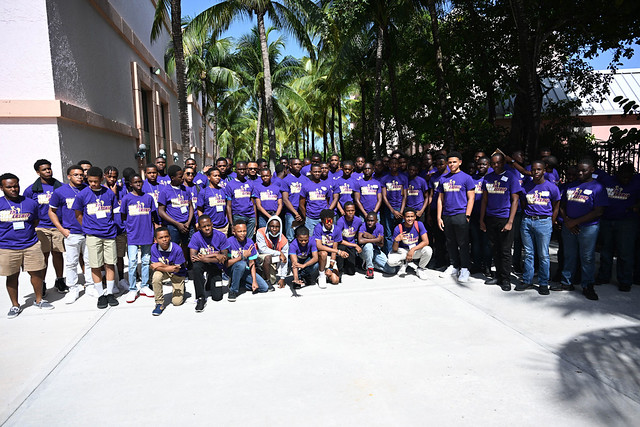
2023 Youth Leadership Conference - Nassau Bahamas 2023

- Talent Hunt Program – Each chapter is required to hold a yearly talent contest, to encourage young people to expose themselves to the Performing Arts. Individuals who win these talent contests receive an award, such as a scholarship.
- Memorial Service – March 12 is Omega Psi Phi Memorial Day. Every chapter of the fraternity performs a ritualistic memorial service to remember members who have died.
- Reclamation and Retention – This program is an effort to encourage inactive members to become fully active and participate in the fraternity's programs.
- College Endowment Funds – The fraternity donates thousands of dollars to Historically Black Colleges and Universities each year.
- Health Initiatives – Chapters are required to coordinate programs that will encourage good health practices. Programs that members involve themselves in include HIV/AIDS awareness, blood drives, prostate cancer awareness, and sickle cell anemia awareness programs.
- Voter Registration, Education and Mobilization – Coordination activities that promote voter registration and mobilization.
- NAACP – A Life Membership at Large in the NAACP is required by all chapters and districts.

== Membership ==
Omega Psi Phi recognizes undergraduate and graduate membership. College students must be working toward a bachelor's degree at a four-year institution, have at least 31 semester credits, and maintain at least a 2.5 grade point average. For the graduate chapter, an applicant must already possess a bachelor's degree. The fraternity grants honorary membership to men who have positively contributed to society on a national or international level.

== Chapters ==
Since its founding the organization has chartered over 750 undergraduate and graduate chapters.

== Notable members ==
A few notable members include Samuel M. Nabrit, Walter E. Massey, Benjamin Mays, Bill Campbell, Bayard Rustin, Langston Hughes, Terrence J, Kevin McCall, Lexington Steele, Count Basie, Roy Wilkins, Benjamin Hooks, Vernon Jordan, Robert Henry Lawrence, Jr., Malcolm Jenkins, Isadore Hall III, Rev. Jesse Jackson, William H. Hastie, L. Douglas Wilder, Representative James Clyburn, Earl Graves, Tom Joyner, Charles Bolden, Ronald McNair, Bill Cosby, General William "Kip" Ward, Michael Jordan, Ovince Saint Preux, Shaquille O'Neal, Roger Kingdom, Terrence Trammell, Shammond Williams, Vince Carter, Steve Harvey, Rickey Smiley, Ray Lewis, Stephen A. Smith, Jalen Hurts, James DuBose, George Clinton, Kevon Williams, DeHart Hubbard, and numerous presidents of colleges and universities. Among the 2013 Super Bowl champion Baltimore Ravens, six players and GM Ozzie Newsome are also members/brothers of the fraternity.

== Scandals, member misconduct and killings ==
- In 1977, Robert Brazile, a student at the University of Pennsylvania, collapsed and died at a fraternity house meeting due to injuries and beatings he sustained while pledging to the fraternity.
- In 1978, Nathaniel Swimson, a student at North Carolina Central University, died during an off-campus initiation activity. He was asked to run several miles before he collapsed and died.
- In 1983, Vann Watts, a student at Tennessee State University, died of an alcohol overdose following an initiation party. It was reported that before his death, he was severely beaten and verbally abused by fraternity members.
- In 1984, a Hampton University student was killed participating in an Omega Psi Phi ritual. The family of the deceased student privately settled with the fraternity for an undisclosed amount as a result of his wrongful death.
- In 1986, Thomas Harold, a student at Lamar University, died as a result of running miles on Lamar's track as part of a pledging task.
- In 1997, the fraternity was court-ordered to pay a former Indiana University pledge of $774,500 for injuries he sustained while pledging in 1994.
- In 1999, Omega Psi Phi was court-ordered to pay a former University of Louisville student nearly $1 million for suffering kidney failure due to hazing activity in 1997.
- In 2001, Joseph T. Green, a student at Tennessee State University, died from an asthma attack he developed from being asked to run long distances while pledging. In 2002, his family filed a $15 million wrongful death lawsuit against the men of Omega Psi Phi Incorporated.
- In 2009, a former pledge at the University of Houston settled with the fraternity for an undisclosed amount after being hit with a baseball bat, wood board, and TV antenna while pledging. The chapter was placed on suspension following this incident.
- In 2015, six Omega Psi Phi members at Johnson C. Smith University were arrested and charged with assault for severely beating pledges over two months.
- In 2015, four Omega Psi Phi members at Saginaw Valley State University were arrested and charged for striking pledges with open hands and paddles. One known pledge sustained a serious injury after losing consciousness one night pledging.
- In 2015, a Florida Atlantic University student reported to the police she was gang-raped at a South Florida Omega Psi Phi "Oil Spill" step show afterparty. Inside the party, she stated she was suddenly and forcefully pulled behind curtains and raped by a group of men in a dark area.
- On August 28, 2016, two Ithaca College students were stabbed (one fatally) as they got into a fight as they left a Omega Psi Phi party held at Willard Straight Hall of Cornell University.
- In April 2017, Omega Psi Phi member and alleged spree killer, Steve Stephens, referred to the fraternity multiple times in videos he posted during his killing spree. Stephens claimed that he was going to shoot "Greeks" in the head until he was caught.
- In 2018, a fraternity member and head accountant at the fraternity headquarters in Georgia blew the whistle in regards to concerning embezzlement allegations among fraternity leadership. As part of his accountant duties, he reported his embezzlement findings to his fraternity's 24-member board of directors and was suspended.
- In 2019, the national leadership of Omega Psi Phi, Inc., halted all new membership initiation activity when Georgia Tech football player Brandon Adams died during a fraternity event. During step practice for pledges at a townhome near campus, Adams collapsed and was taken to a local hospital where he was pronounced dead.
- In 2023, three Memphis officers that were members of the fraternity had their memberships permanently revoked due to their involvement with the killing of Tyre Nichols. A picture went viral on social media of one of the officers wearing an Omega Psi Phi wristband doing the killing which sparked outrage from many black activists and prompted an official response from the fraternity.
- In February 2025, 20-year-old Southern University student Caleb Wilson, died in a local hospital after an off-campus pledge ritual. He was punched in the chest several times before he collapsed and had a seizure. In March 2025, three fraternity members were arrested and charged for his death. In July 2025, the university expelled the chapter from campus. In September 2025, the family of Caleb Wilson filed a wrongful death lawsuit.
- In September 2025, a former pledge at the University of Southern Mississippi filed a federal lawsuit for severe emotional distress and medical bills he gained due to pledging the fraternity in 2023. Also due to his injuries, he was forced to drop out of college. He was struck with two-by-four planks by fraternity members that sent him to a hospital where he underwent a blood transfusion and emergency surgery while being treated for other serious injuries.

== See also ==
- College fraternities and sororities
- List of social fraternities and sororities
- List of African-American fraternities
