= Oscar James Cooper =

African-American physician and cultural leader

- Born: 1888; Washington, D.C., US
- Died: October 9, 1972; Philadelphia, Pennsylvania, US
- Education: Howard University
- Occupation: Physician
- Known for: Co-founder of Omega Psi Phi

Oscar James Cooper (1888 – October 9, 1972) was a physician and African-American cultural leader. He is known for cofounding Omega Psi Phi in Washington, D.C., the first fraternity founded by students at a historically black college. In Philadelphia, Pennsylvania, he was a charter member of the Pyramid Club.

== Early life ==
Cooper was born in Washington, D.C. in 1888. He attended Howard University, receiving a Bachelor's degree in 1913. Cooper majored in biology and was a lab assistant for biologist Ernest Everett Just.

While an undergraduate at Howard, Cooper cofounded Omega Psi Phi fraternity, along with Edgar Amos Love and Frank Coleman on November 17, 1911. The idea forming a fraternity began with a conversation between Love and Cooper, who were later joined by Coleman. Cooper was the fraternity's first secretary. Omega Psi Phi was the first Black fraternity whose founders were at a historically black college or university, and eventually grew to over 750 chapters.

Cooper studied medicine at Howard University, receiving a Doctor of Medicine in 1917. He taught zoology at Howard before he received his medical degree. He interned at Mercy Hospital in Philadelphia.

== Career ==
After medical school, Cooper moved to Philadelphia, Pennsylvania where he practiced medicine for fifty years until his death. He was a member of the American Medical Association, National Medical Association, the Philadelphia County Medical Society, and the Medical Society of Eastern Pennsylvania.

== Personal life ==
Cooper married Willia May Simon. They lived at 1621 West Jefferson Street in Philadelphia, where Cooper also practiced medicine. Cooper was closely involved with the founding and early years of the Pyramid Club on Girard Avenue in Cecil B. Moore, Philadelphia, which provided events and cultural engagement for African-American professionals in Philadelphia. He belonged to the First African Baptist Church in Philadelphia.

In May 1964, Cooper was bound and gagged at gunpoint by two men who stole $75 from his home office. His wife, who was upstairs, heard a commotion and called the police.

Cooper died of cancer on October 9, 1972 at the Lankenau Hospital in Philadelphia. He was buried at the Whitemarsh Memorial Park.

== Honors ==
Cooper was honored by the Pennsylvania Historical and Museum Commission on October 2, 2021, with a historical marker at the site of his home and office in Cecil B. Moore. The marker was approved along with two other markers in Philadelphia County, honoring Anna Elizabeth Dickinson and the Wyck House and Rose Garden; it was one of 23 markers approved out of 39 applications across the state, officially announced on March 10, 2021. The text of the marker reads:

Dr. Oscar James Cooper (1888–1972)

One of the founders of Omega Psi Phi (OPP) at Howard University, the nation's first fraternity established at a historically Black college or university. Following graduation, Cooper became a physician and settled in Philadelphia, where he spent his entire career. He continued his role as a founder of many influential organizations, including the Philadelphia Chapter of OPP, was a charter member of the Pyramid Club, and supported many Black charities.

At the unveiling ceremony for the marker, the block of Jefferson Street between 16th and 17th was renamed to Dr. Oscar J. Cooper Way.

== See also ==
- List of people from Philadelphia
- List of Pennsylvania state historical markers in Philadelphia County
