= Black Apollo of Science =

Book by Kenneth Manning

Black Apollo of Science: The Life of Ernest Everett Just
- Author: Kenneth R. Manning
- Language: English
- Genre: Biography
- Publisher: Oxford University Press
- Publication date: 1983
- Publication place: United States
- Media type: Print (Hardcover)
- Pages: 416
- ISBN: 1593933355

Black Apollo of Science: The Life of Ernest Everett Just is a biography of African American biologist Ernest Everett Just, written in 1983 by Kenneth R. Manning. Just (1883-1941) was a pioneering African American biologist and educator. The book, which was published by Oxford University Press, provided an in-depth study of Just's research and discoveries within fertilization, early embryonic development, and the properties of the cell surface, and it also detailed the difficult social environment facing African American scientists within U.S. academia during the first part of the 20th century.

Manning, a professor at the Massachusetts Institute of Technology, received the 1983 Pfizer Award for the book, which was also a finalist for the 1984 Pulitzer Prize for Biography or Autobiography. The book was also cited by The New York Times as one of its notable books of the year 1984.
