= Edgar Amos Love =

American bishop and fraternity founder

- Born: September 10, 1891; Harrisonburg, Virginia, U.S.
- Died: May 1, 1974 (aged 82); Baltimore, Maryland, U.S.
- Burial place: Mount Auburn Cemetery (Baltimore, Maryland)
- Education: Morgan College; Howard University; Boston University School of Theology
- Occupations: Methodist Episcopal Church bishop and pastor
- Known for: Founding Omega Psi Phi

Edgar Amos Love (September 10, 1891 – May 1, 1974) was an American bishop with the Methodist Episcopal and a civil rights spokesman. He is also noted as a founder of Omega Psi Phi, the first international fraternity founded at an HBCU.

== Early life ==
Edgar Amos Love was born in the Carter's Methodist Church parsonage in Harrisonburg, Virginia. His father, Julius C. Love, was a minister in the Methodist Episcopal Church. His mother, Susie Love (née Carr), was also a licensed minister and the first woman to graduate from Morgan College. Due to the pastoral obligations of his father, Love spent portions of his childhood in Maryland, Virginia, and West Virginia. He was one of seven children.

Love graduated from the Normal and Industrial Academy of Morgan College from 1904 to 1909. He earned a Bachelor of Arts degree from Howard University in 1913. While at Howard, Love and two other students, Oscar James Cooper and Frank Coleman, established Omega Psi Phi Fraternity on November 17, 1911. Ernest Everett Just assisted the students in their endeavors. Love was a charter member for Howard's Alpha chapter on December 15, 1911, and served as its first Grand Basileus (president).

In 1916, Love received a Bachelor of Divinity degree from the Howard University School of Religion. He matriculated to the Boston University School of Theology, obtaining a Bachelor of Sacred Theology in 1918. He also took graduate courses at the University of Chicago.

== Career ==
During World War I, Love spent fourteen months overseas, serving as a chaplain in for the 368 Infantry of United States Army in France. Upon honorable discharge, he became a professor of history and Bible at Morgan College for two years, also serving as the school's athletic director and the academy's principal.

After leaving Morgan, Love embarked on a career as a Methodist minister with appointments in Fairmount, Maryland for fifteen months; in Washington, D.C. for four years; in Annapolis, Maryland for three years; in Wheeling, West Virginia for three years, and at the John Wesley United Methodist Church in Baltimore, Maryland for two years. In 1922, he was elected to serve as the national chaplain for the American Negro Veterans of the World War.

In 1933, Love became district superintendent of the Washington Conference of the Methodist Church. In 1940, he led the Methodist Department of Negro Work and worked with the Division of Missions in New York City.

He worked with Mary McLeod Bethune who joined the Methodist Federation for Social Services from 1940 to 1944. He was elected a Bishop of the segregated Central Conference (Baltimore area) of the Methodist Church on June 22, 1952, serving in this position until his retirement on June 21, 1964. The Central Conference was located from Delaware to North Carolina. During his time as Bishop, Love helped integrate the church.

Love served on various boards of the Methodist Church, including the Board of Missions, the Board of Evangelism, the Board of Christian Spiritual Concerns, the Commission on Chaplains, the Coordinating Council, and the Methodist Corporation. He also visited missions stations in Burma, Hong Kong, India, Japan, Malaysia, and the Philippines. He was the president of the Interdomonimational Ministerial Alliance of Washington, D.C., president of the Christian Conference Educational Fund for eight years, and president of the Methodist Federation for Social Action for ten years.

Love helped integrate the church. He came out of retirement to serve as the Bishop of the Atlantic Coast Area from November 1966 through June 1967. The Atlantic Coast Area included churches in Alabama, Florida, Georgia, and Mississippi.

== Honors ==
- Love received an honorary Doctorate of Divinity degree from Morgan College in 1936.
- He also received honorary doctorates from Gammon Theological Seminary in 1946.
- He received an honorary Doctorate of Divinity fand Boston University in 1956.
- The Virginia Department of Historic Resources installed an historic marker about Love in Harrisonburg, Virginia in 2014.

== Personal life ==
Love married Virginia Louise Ross of Staunton, Virginia on June 16, 1923. They had one son, Jon E. Love.

During the 1950s, Love helped with voter registration drives and was involved in desegregation efforts, including officiating for interracial marriages. He served on the Maryland Inter-Racial Commission under Gov. Albert C. Ritchie.

He was a trustee for numerous colleges, including Bennett College, Gammon Theological Seminary, Morgan College, Morristown Junior College, and Wesley Theological Seminary and was president of the Alumni Association of Howard University School of Religion. He was a member of the NAACP, the Prince Hall Free Masons (having been a founding member of Corinthian Lodge #18 in Washington, D.C.), Sigma Pi Phi, the Improved Benevolent and Protective Order of Elks of the World, Frontiers of America, and the American Legion.

After retirement, Love lived in Baltimore. In 1974, he died in the Provident Hospital in Baltimore at the age of 82. He was buried in Mount Auburn Cemetery in Baltimore.
