= James K. Coyne III =

American politician (born 1946)

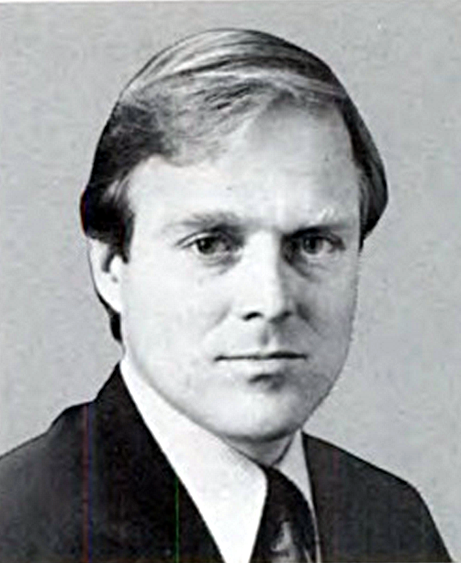

Member of the U.S. House of Representatives from Pennsylvania's 8th district
- In office January 3, 1981 – January 3, 1983
- Preceded by: Peter H. Kostmayer
- Succeeded by: Peter H. Kostmayer

Personal details
- Born: James Kitchenman Coyne III; November 17, 1946 (age 79) Farmville, Virginia, U.S.
- Party: Republican
- Spouse: Helen Biddle Mercer (m. 1970)
- Relations: James Kitchenman (great-great-grandfather)
- Children: 3
- Education: Yale University (BS); Harvard University (MBA)

James Kitchenman Coyne III (born November 17, 1946) is an American businessman and former politician. From 1981 to 1983, he served one term as a Republican member of the U.S. House of Representatives from Pennsylvania.

== Early life ==
James Kitchenman Coyne III was born on November 17, 1946, in Farmville, Virginia, to Pearl Beatrice (née Black) and James Kitchenman Coyne Jr. He is a great-great-grandson of Philadelphia manufacturer James Kitchenman. Coyne graduated from Abington High School in Abington, Pennsylvania, in 1964. He graduated with a Bachelor of Science from Yale University in 1968 and an MBA from Harvard Business School in 1970.

== Career ==
Coyne worked as a businessman and consultant. He served as lecturer at the Wharton School, University of Pennsylvania from 1974 to 1979. He was president of Coyne Chemical Corporation from 1971 to 1981.

Coyne was supervisor of Upper Makefield Township in 1980. He was elected in 1980 as a Republican to the 97th Congress. He was an unsuccessful candidate for re-election in 1982.

Coyne served from 1983 to 1985 as a special assistant to President Ronald Reagan. He was director of the White House Office of Private Sector Initiatives from 1983 to 1985. He was chief executive officer of the American Consulting Engineers Council from 1985 to 1986. He was president of the American Tort Reform Association from 1986 to 1988. In 1987, he founded Americans to Limit Congressional Terms.

Coyne co-authored Cleaning House with John Fund. The publication promoted state referendums to set term limits for members of the U.S. Congress. In 1994, he was chosen president of the National Air Transportation Association, where he served until 2012.

== Personal life ==
Coyne married Helen Biddle Mercer on October 24, 1970. They have three children, Alexander Black, Katherine Mercer, and Michael Atkinson. He is a resident of Newtown, Pennsylvania.

U.S. House of Representatives
Preceded by Peter H. Kostmayer	Member of the U.S. House of Representatives from Pennsylvania's 8th congressional district 1981–1983	Succeeded by Peter H. Kostmayer
U.S. order of precedence (ceremonial)
Preceded by Gabby Giffords as Former U.S. Representative	Order of precedence of the United States as Former U.S. Representative	Succeeded by Marjorie Margolies as Former U.S. Representative
