= Margaret Just Butcher =

American educator and civil rights activist (1913–2000)

Margaret Just Butcher

Margaret Just Butcher (April 28, 1913 – February 7, 2000) was an American educator and civil rights activist. Butcher worked as an English professor at Howard University and Federal City College. She also taught for years overseas. She was a fellow of the Julius Rosenwald Foundation.

During the 1950s, she was a Fulbright Visiting Professor at two universities in France. In the early 1960s she taught in two cities in Morocco, and then served as a cultural affairs attache in Paris, returning to Washington, D.C., in 1968. She taught in its public schools for a time.

Beginning in 1953, Butcher served on the city's Board of Education. She also worked with the NAACP on their suit for desegregation of public schools. Following the Brown v. Board of Education (1954) ruling by the US Supreme Court, she pressed city officials to proceed with desegregating the schools.

Butcher is also known for her collaborative work with philosopher and cultural leader Alain Locke, who had been a mentor at Howard University. They became friends and she helped care for him in his last illness. From his notes and their discussions, she edited and completed The Negro in American Culture, which was published in 1956 after his death.

== Early life and education ==
Margaret Just was born in Washington, D.C., on April 28, 1913, to educated parents. Her father was biologist Ernest Everett Just, and her mother, Ethel Highwarden, was an educator. She was provided the best schooling in the area and studied in Italy with her father in 1927. She earned her Ph.D. in 1947 from Boston University.

== Career ==
=== Educator ===
Just worked as a professor of English at Virginia Union during the 1935-1936 school year. She taught public school in Washington, D.C., from 1937 to 1941, when teachers were federal employees. In 1941, she was selected as a Rosenwald Fellow. Starting in 1942, she taught at Howard University, where she became a colleague of professor Alain Locke.

In 1950 Butcher (who had married the previous year) went to Europe as a Fulbright Visiting Professor. She was the first woman to serve as a visiting professor in the Fulbright program. In Europe, she taught at the University of Grenoble and the University of Lyon in France. She also worked to interview other Fulbright candidates in France. After her return to Washington, she taught at Howard until 1955.

From 1960 to 1965, Butcher taught overseas again. She taught English and American culture in Rabat and was the director of the English Language Training Institute in Casablanca, Morocco. She also worked as the "cultural affairs attache to Paris" in the 1960s, returning to Washington in 1968.

After her return to the capital, she taught at Federal City College from 1971 to 1982.

=== Civil rights work ===
Butcher was a passionate advocate for civil rights. In 1953, she was named as a member of the Washington, D.C., Board of Education, replacing Velma G. Williams. The Pittsburgh Courier praised her "militant" approach to fighting segregation in public schools. Butcher found discrepancies between the schools for white and black students and called out the inequity in the classrooms.

From 1954 to 1955, she worked with Thurgood Marshall and the NAACP Legal Defense Fund as a special education consultant for their suit about segregation in schools.

After the Supreme Court ruled that segregation in public schools was unconstitutional, Butcher warned there were additional fights against discrimination facing black people in America. The superintendent of the Washington, D.C., schools, Hobart M. Corning, favored a gradual approach to integrating the schools, which Butcher disagreed with. A white nationalist group, the NAAWP, called for her to resign from the board and called her a "'tool' of the NAACP", unable to be objective on school integration.

Butcher was open about her work for the NAACP and publicly criticized Corning's plan to delay integration in Washington schools. She discussed the plans to integrate the schools on behalf of the NAACP at the annual meeting of the Newport News branch in 1954. In 1955, Butcher continued to speak out against gradual integration, saying that the Washington schools were still largely segregated and that waiting would not accomplish their goals. The New York Age called her a "constant thorn in the side of the Washington, D.C., school board." She remained on the board until 1956. During this period, Virginia and other Southern states conducted massive resistance; in some instances, school districts closed rather than achieve any integration. Because private schools were not covered by the Supreme Court's ruling, numerous private religious schools were opened across the South, known as "segregation academies".

The Lambda Kappa Mu sorority honored Butcher for her fight against segregation in 1954.

=== Politics ===
Butcher was appointed in 1952 to the National Civil Defense Advisory Council. She succeeded Mary McLeod Bethune, who retired due to health issues.

In 1956 and 1960, Butcher served as a delegate from the District of Columbia to the Democratic National Convention.

=== The Negro in American Culture ===
Butcher wrote The Negro in American Culture, based on the notes of her mentor and friend, Alain Locke and furthering his work.

When Locke became sick, Butcher helped care for him, visiting him at home daily, preparing meals for him, and taking him to the hospital. After Locke died, Butcher used notes that Locke left for her and finished his work. The book was published in 1956, revised and reprinted in 1971, and translated into 11 different languages.

== Personal life ==
Butcher was briefly married to Stanton Wormley. They had a daughter, Sheryl Everett Wormley, before they divorced.

Around 1949, Just Wormley married James W. Butcher Jr., a Howard drama professor. In 1959 she sought a divorce from her husband, and kept his name. Her daughter, Everett Wormley, eventually held a "high science post."

Butcher died on February 7, 2000, aged 86, in Washington, D.C.
