= Elizabeth Kitchenman Coyne =

American painter

Elizabeth Kitchenman Coyne (June 21, 1892 – April 11, 1971) was a Pennsylvania impressionist painter, best known for her landscapes and paintings of horses. Her works are included in the permanent collections of the Pennsylvania Academy of the Fine Arts, the Woodmere Art Museum and the Philadelphia Art Alliance.

== Education ==
Elizabeth Kitchenman Coyne was born on June 21, 1892, to George S. Coyne, a Philadelphia chemical manufacturer, and Mary A. (Kitchenman) Coyne, a daughter of textile manufacturer James Kitchenman.

Coyne graduated from Friends Central School in 1910. She then studied at the Philadelphia School of Design for Women (now Moore College of Art and Design) with Leopold Seyffert and later at the Pennsylvania Academy of Fine Art with Cecilia Beaux, Edwin Blashfield, Hugh H. Breckenridge and Philip Leslie Hale. Coyne received a Cresson Traveling Scholarship from PAFA in 1918.

== Career ==
Coyne was a fellow of the Pennsylvania Academy of the Fine Arts (PAFA). She exhibited with the Society of Independent Artists in 1934. She was an active exhibitor at PAFA, The Plastic Club, the Corcoran Gallery, and the Pyramid Club among others. As well as showing works in oils, she exhibited in the Philadelphia Water Color Exhibition.

She received a number of awards and medals. At the Plastic Club in 1931, she received First Prize for Water Color for one of a trio of paintings of Niagara Falls. Other awards include the Alumnae Award Medal from the Women's School of Design, Philadelphia in 1931; the Alumnae Purchase Award from Moore College of Art and Design in 1934; the Gold Medal of the Plastic Club in 1938; and the Gold Medal of the Pennsylvania Academy of the Fine Arts in 1939.

The Annual Oil Show at the Plastic Club ... Elizabeth Coyne’s “Flowers and Mirror,” which was awarded the Gold Medal, is a study in reflections—those of the vase in the mirror and of the brilliant flowers in the surface of the black vase.

The Elizabeth Coyne Memorial Prize is given in her memory by the Woodmere Art Museum.
