= Humbert Howard =

American artist (1905 or 1915–1990)

Humbert Lincoln Howard
- Born: 1905 or 1915; Philadelphia, Pennsylvania, U.S.
- Died: 1990; Philadelphia, Pennsylvania, U.S.
- Known for: Painter, ceramicist
- Website: humbert-howard.com

Humbert Howard (1905 or 1915–1990) was an American artist and art director of the Pyramid Club.

== Biography ==
Howard was born in Philadelphia. Sources differ on Howard's birth year, some stating 1905 and some stating 1915. Howard attended Howard University and the University of Pennsylvania. During the 1930s Howard worked for the Philadelphia Works Progress Administration's Art project (WPA).

Howard was best known for being an active member of the Pyramid Club, serving as the art/exhibition director from 1940 through 1958. The Pyramid Club was an African-American social club in Philadelphia. Howard selected works for the club's annual exhibitions in New York and Philadelphia.

From 1959 to 1961, Howard studied at the Barnes Foundation, an experience that affected his style, making it more abstract.

His work was included in the 1967 exhibition The Evolution of Afro-American Artists at the City College of New York.

Howard died in 1990 in Philadelphia.

Howard's work is in the collection of the Pennsylvania Academy of the Fine Arts, the Philadelphia Museum of Art, the Delaware Art Museum, and the Woodmere Art Museum. His paper are in the Archives of American Art at the Smithsonian Institution.

== Legacy ==
In 2000 his work was included in An Exuberant Bounty: Prints and Drawings by African Americans at the Philadelphia Museum of Art]. Howard's work was included in the 2015 exhibition We Speak: Black Artists in Philadelphia, 1920s-1970s at the Woodmere Art Museum.
