= Kenneth Manning =

American academic professor and author (born 1947)

Kenneth R. Manning
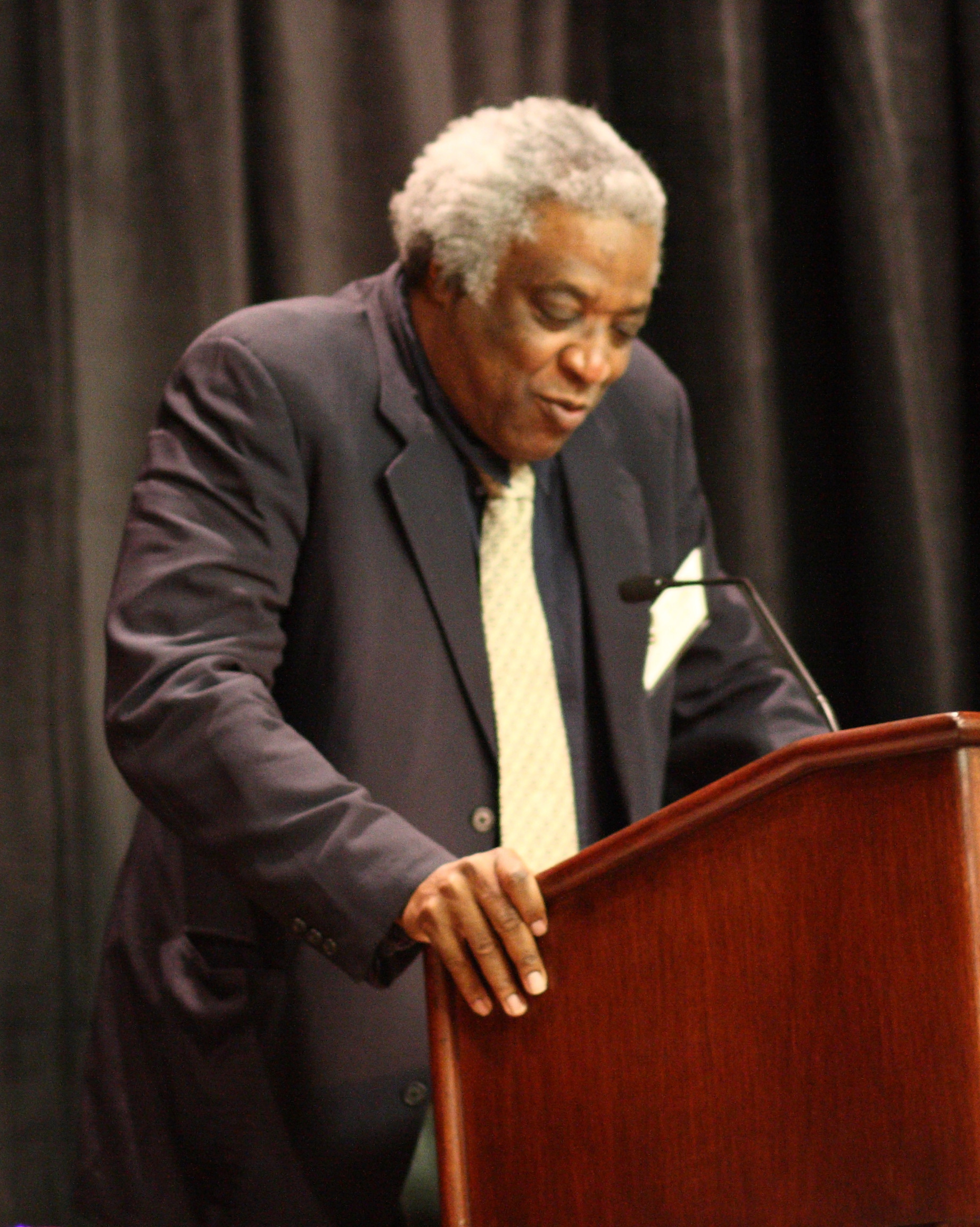
- Kenneth R. Manning at a meeting of the History of Science Society in 2009
- Born: December 11, 1947; Dillon, South Carolina, U.S.
- Education: Harvard University (BA, MA, PhD)

Kenneth R. Manning (born December 11, 1947) is an American academic professor and author. He is currently the Thomas Meloy Professor of Rhetoric and of the History of Science at the Massachusetts Institute of Technology (MIT).

== Early life and education ==
Born in Dillon, South Carolina and educated in local schools, Manning eventually moved to North Haven, Connecticut, soon afterwards. Manning entered Harvard University in 1966 and completed his Bachelor of Arts (B.A.) in 1970, his Master of Arts (M.A.) in 1971, and his Ph.D. in 1974. His dissertation, The Emergence of the Weierstrassian Approach To Complex Analysis, was supervised by I. Bernard Cohen.

While he was doing his graduate studies, Manning helped guide fellow Dillon native Ben Bernanke, who would eventually become the Chairman of the Federal Reserve, to apply to Harvard. He helped assuage the Bernanke family, who were concerned that Ben would "lose his Jewish identity" if he went to Harvard, that "there were Jews in Boston."

== Career ==
Manning has been on the faculty at MIT since 1974.

Manning's 1983 book, Black Apollo of Science: The Life of Ernest Everett Just, depicts the life and career of Ernest Everett Just, who was born in Charleston, South Carolina and went on to become a world-famous biologist. Manning won several awards for the book and was a finalist for the Pulitzer Prize in Biography. Manning was also inducted into the Order of the Palmetto by former South Carolina governor, Richard Riley. Manning's other writings have appeared in numerous scholarly publications. He is currently working on a book manuscript that examines health care for African Americans and the role and experience of blacks in the American medical profession from 1860 until 1980.

== Bibliography ==
- Kenneth R. Manning (September 1983) Black Apollo of Science: The Life of Ernest Everett Just. Oxford University Press. ISBN 978-0-19-503299-4
- Kenneth R. Manning (September 1991) MIT: Shaping the Future. The MIT Press. ISBN 978-0-262-63141-9
- Kenneth R. Manning, Bayla Singer Asa J. Davis (1995) Blueprint for Change: The Life and Times of Lewis H. Latimer. Queens Borough Public Library. ISBN 978-0-9645337-0-7
