= James Kitchenman =

English-American textile manufacturer

- Born: November 19, 1825; Barnsley, England
- Died: December 25, 1909 (aged 84); Philadelphia, Pennsylvania, U.S.
- Resting place: Laurel Hill Cemetery, Philadelphia, Pennsylvania, U.S.
- Known for: Carpet manufacturing
- Spouse: Margaret Crawford

James Kitchenman (November 19, 1825 – December 25, 1909) was an English-American textile manufacturer who owned the Kitchenman & Neal carpet manufacturing operations in the Kensington neighborhood of Philadelphia, Pennsylvania.

== Early life ==
Kitchenman was born in Barnsley, England, on November 19, 1825, to Richard Kitchenman and Phoebe Foster Kitchenman. He traveled as a child with his parents to America. His financial resources were very limited and he took a job as a youth in a dye shop.

== Career ==
=== Dyes ===
He worked in a dye house and became familiar with the business. He was determined to engage in the same line some day with his own company. He established a successful dyeing business which he operated for many years.

=== Carpets ===
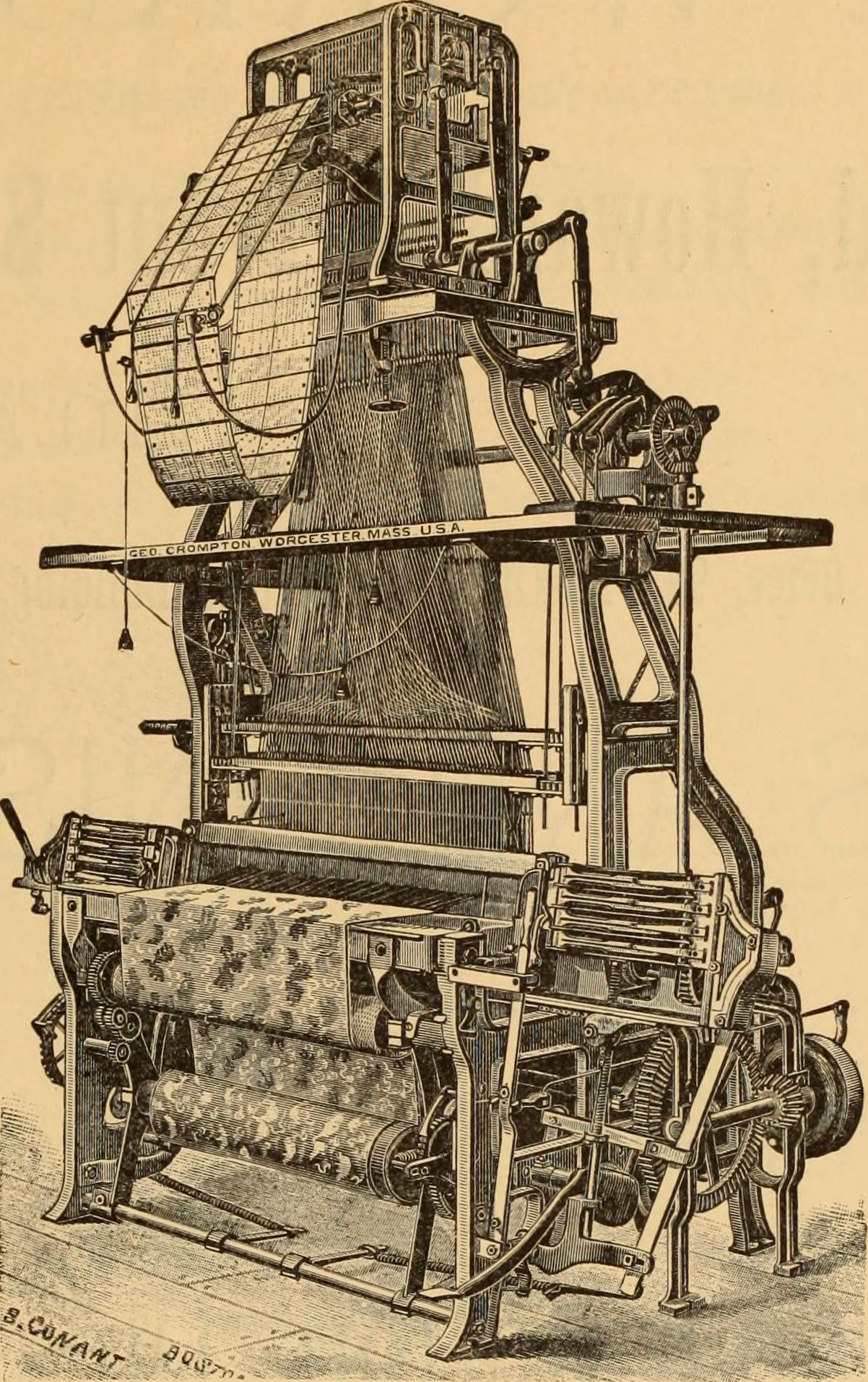
Crompton Loom

He engaged in the manufacture of carpets with Samuel Horner and his brother at Amber and Letterly streets. After the dissolution of that partnership he turned his attention to the manufacture of ingrain carpets and woolen and worsted yarns, having a large plant at Huntingdon and Jasper streets.

He was joined in a partnership by George M. Neal in the manufacture of body Brussels and Axminster carpets, under the company name of Kitchenman & Neal. With the growth of the business he kept increasing his facilities, adding to his mill until he had one of the largest and finest manufacturing enterprises in Kensington. He used the Markland loom of 1868, and later the more efficient Crompton & Knowles ingrain looms.

=== Hosiery ===
He also took up the manufacture of hosiery, which he carried on a large scale at Amber and Letterly streets. The attractiveness of design and the excellence of quality in all of his manufactured products brought him substantial success, his sales annually increased until he became recognized as one of the most prominent manufacturers of eastern Pennsylvania. About fifteen years prior to his death he retired from active business, although he still retained his mill at Jasper and Huntingdon streets.

== Family ==
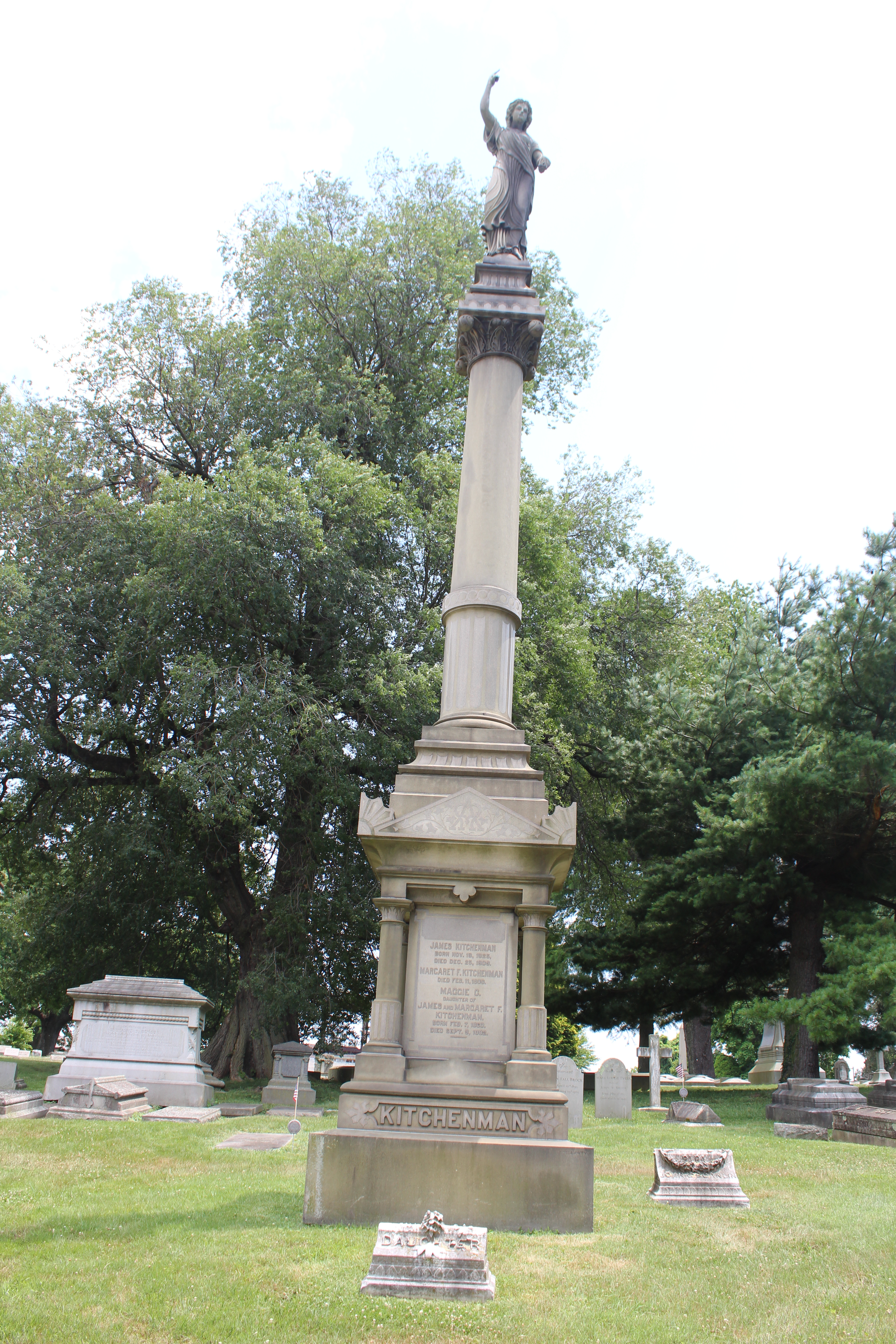
James Kitchenman memorial in Laurel Hill Cemetery

Kitchenman was married in Philadelphia in the 1850s to Miss Margaret Crawford, a daughter of William Crawford, who was an early resident of this city. Among their descendants are the artist Elizabeth Kitchenman Coyne and Republican former member of the U.S. House of Representatives James K. Coyne III.

Kitchenman was a member of the Independent Order of Odd Fellows and attended the Bethel Presbyterian church in North Philadelphia. His political allegiance was given to the Democratic party. In 1885, he was proposed as a candidate for Sheriff of Philadelphia, by a committee from the Knights of Labor, who applauded him as a Democrat, businessman, and "friend of labor" who sought to protect workingmen's rights to fair wages. He was a public-spirited citizen and supported various projects and movements for the general good.

His last years were spent in retirement from business in a home at 1024 West Lehigh Avenue, Philadelphia, where he remained until his death, which occurred on Christmas Day of 1909. He is buried in Laurel Hill Cemetery.

== Hexamer General Surveys ==
The Hexamer General Surveys document the floor plans for a number of Kitchenman's factories over time.

- Hexamer General Surveys, Volume 6, Plate 464: James Kitchenman's Carpet Manufactory
- Hexamer General Surveys, Volume 7, Plate 648: James Kitchenman's Worsted Factory
- Hexamer General Surveys, Volume 12, Plate 1085: James Kitchenman's Worsted Factory
- Hexamer General Surveys, Volume 13, Plate 1200: James Kitchenman's Worsted Factory
- Hexamer General Surveys, Volume 17, Plate 1629: James Kitchenman's Carpet Factory
- Hexamer General Surveys, Volume 30, Plate 2941: James Kitchenman's Carpet Factory

== Sources ==
This article incorporates text from a free content work. Text taken from Oberholtzer, Ellis Paxson (1912). Philadelphia, A History of the City and its People; A Record of 225 Years. Vol. 4. Philadelphia: S. H. Clark. p. 418.
