= The Biology of the Cell Surface =

1939 biology book by Ernest Everett Just

- Title page for The Biology of the Cell Surface (1939)
- Author: Ernest Everett Just
- Language: English
- Genre: Biology
- Publisher: P. Blakiston’s Son & Co
- Publication date: 1939
- Publication place: United States

The Biology of the Cell Surface is a book by American biologist Ernest Everett Just. It was published by P. Blakiston’s Son & Co in 1939.

Just began writing the book in 1934 in Naples and finished it in France, shortly before being sent to a prisoner-of-war camp. He considered the book to be his "crowning achievement". The book examined the role of the cell surface in embryology, development and evolution, and presented a critique of gene theory, particularly the views of Jacques Loeb. Sapp suggests that "Just’s theorizing on the cell cortex [in this work] was unsurpassed".
