= Laura Wheeler Waring =

American artist, educator (1887–1948)

- Born: Laura Wheeler; May 26, 1887; Hartford, Connecticut, United States
- Died: February 3, 1948 (aged 60); Philadelphia, Pennsylvania, United States
- Education: Pennsylvania Academy of the Fine Arts, Académie de la Grande Chaumière
- Known for: Painting
- Spouse: Walter E. Waring

Laura Wheeler Waring (May 26, 1887 – February 3, 1948) was an African-American artist and educator, most renowned for her realistic portraits, landscapes, still-life, and well-known African American portraitures she made during the Harlem Renaissance. She was one of the few African American artists in France, a turning point of her career and profession where she attained widespread attention, exhibited in Paris, won awards, and spent the next 30 years teaching art at Cheyney University in Pennsylvania.

== Early life, and education ==
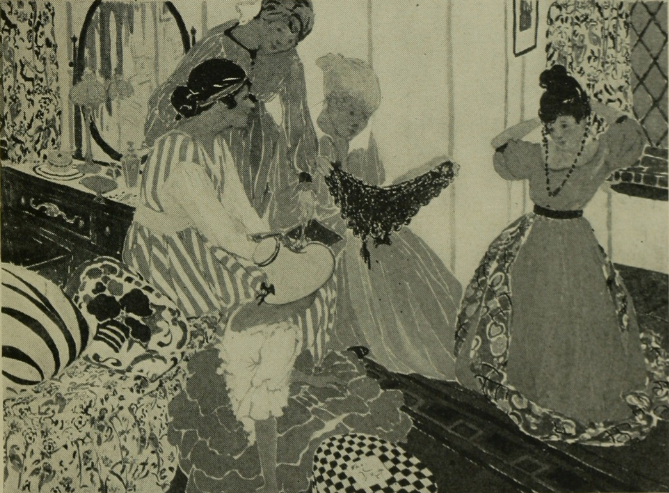
Black and white reproduction of Heirlooms, 1916 New York Watercolor Club Exhibition

Laura Wheeler was born on May 26, 1887, in Hartford, Connecticut, the fourth child of six, to Mary (née Freeman) and Reverend Robert Foster Wheeler. Her mother was a teacher and an amateur artist and daughter of Amos Noë Freeman, a Presbyterian minister, and Christiana Williams Freeman, a seamstress, who had been prominent in anti-slavery activities, including the Underground Railroad in Portland, Maine and Brooklyn, New York. Her father was the pastor of Talcott Street Congregational Church, the first all-black church in Connecticut. She came from an educated family with five previous generations of college graduates before her.

In 1906, Waring began teaching part-time in Philadelphia at Cheyney Training School for Teachers (later renamed Cheyney State Teachers College and now known as Cheyney University.) She taught art and music at Cheyney until 1914 when she traveled abroad to Europe. Her occupation at Cheyney was time-consuming, as it was a boarding school and she was often needed to work evenings and Sundays. This left her without much time to practice art. 1906–1914 were slow years for her artistic career as a result of this. Waring worked long hours teaching art, sometimes spending summers teaching drawing at Harvard and Columbia for additional money. While attending Hartford Public High School, Wheeler was recognized for her talent in painting. Waring graduated from Hartford Public High School in 1906.

She studied at the Pennsylvania Academy of the Fine Arts in Philadelphia, graduating in 1914. In 1914, she was granted the A. William Emlen Cresson Memorial Travel Scholarship to study art at the Louvre in Paris. She was the first Black woman to receive the award. Ellen Powell Tiberino was awarded the scholarship in 1959.

== First time in Paris ==
In 1914 Laura Wheeler-Waring was granted a trip to Europe by the Pennsylvania Academy of Fine Arts’ William E. Cresson Memorial Scholarship. She studied at the Académie de la Grande Chaumière in Paris, France, and traveled throughout Great Britain. While living in Paris, Wheeler-Waring frequented the Jardin du Luxembourg. She painted Le Parc Du Luxembourg (1918), oil on canvas, based on a sketch she made during one of her recurrent visits. Wheeler-Waring also spent much time in the Louvre Museum studying Monet, Manet, Corot, and Cézanne. "I thought again and again how little of the beauty of really great pictures is revealed in the reproductions which we see and how freely and with what ease the great masters paint."

Wheeler-Waring planned on traveling more to Switzerland, Italy, Germany, and the Netherlands, but her trip was cut short when war was declared in Europe. After being in Europe for three months, she was required to return to the United States. Waring's trip at the time had very little effect on her career, but it has been remarked as a major influence on her and her work as an artist. Receiving the scholarship gave her the time to evolve as an artist and, as the award was highly regarded, she also gained publicity by it.

== Return to United States ==
After she returned from Europe, she continued to work at Cheyney and did so for more than thirty years. There, she founded the school's art and music departments. In her later years at Cheyney, she was the director of the art programs.

== Second time in Paris (1924–1925) ==
After the end of the war, Waring returned to Paris in June 1924. Her second trip to Paris was regarded to be a turning point in her style as well as her career. Waring described this time as the most purely art-motivated period in her life, the "only period of uninterrupted life as an artist with an environment and associates that were a constant stimulus and inspiration." For approximately four months, Waring lived in France, absorbing French culture and lifestyle. She began to paint many portraits, and in October enrolled to study at the Académie de la Grande Chaumiére, where she studied painting. During this trip, she exhibited her work in Parisian art galleries for the first time.

In January 1925, Waring traveled to the South of France where she spent four days in Ville-franche-sur-Mer. There she spent her time creating illustrations of short travel stories and figurative pen and ink drawings for the Crisis Magazine. These drawings included an illustration titled Once More We Exchange Adieu, a pen and ink drawing of an African American woman dressed in a modern collared long sleeve dress, with black pumps holding a briefcase waving goodbye to a white woman and child dressed in winter attire.

Waring continued her studies at the Chaumière and stayed in the Villa de Villiers in Neuilly-sur-Seine in the spring of 1925, where she documented her artistic progress.

Instead of soft, pastel tones she painted a more vibrant and realistic method. Houses at Semur, France (1925), oil on canvas, has been noted by art historians the painting that marked Waring's change in style. Her use of vivid color, light, and atmosphere in this work is characteristic of the style she established after this trip to Europe and which she continued throughout her career.

== Later work ==
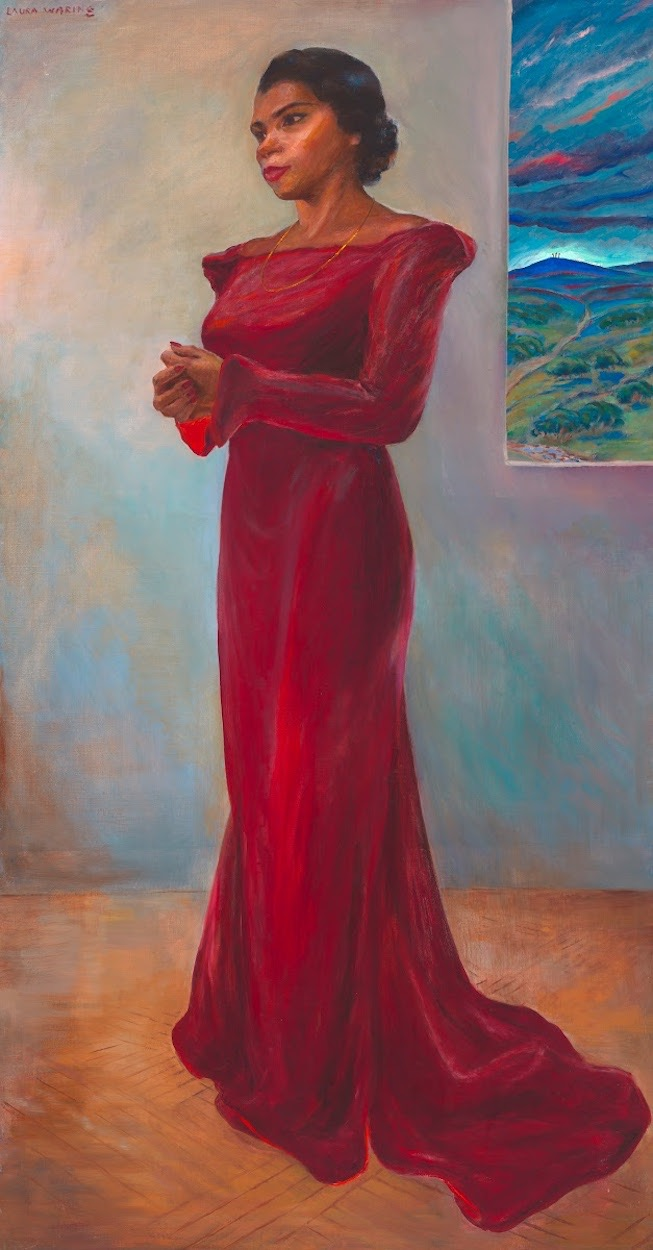
Marian Anderson portrayed (1944).

Waring was among the artists displayed in the country's first exhibition of African-American art, held in 1927 by the William E. Harmon Foundation. She was commissioned by the Harmon Foundation to do portraits of prominent African Americans and chose some associated with the Harlem Renaissance. Her work was soon displayed in American institutions, including the Corcoran Gallery in Washington, DC, the Brooklyn Museum, and the Philadelphia Museum of Art. She currently has portraits in the Smithsonian National Portrait Gallery.

In 1931, Waring's illustration appeared in The Crisis; a black and white drawing of a nativity scene with a black Magus admiring the birth of Christ.

In 1944, eight of her portraits were included in the Portraits of Outstanding Americans of Negro Origin. Subjects of her portraits included Marian Anderson, W.E.B. DuBois, James Weldon Johnson, and Mary White Ovington.

Besides a posthumous exhibition at Howard University in 1949, Waring's paintings made in Paris are not believed to have been exhibited and their whereabouts are unknown. In addition to painting, Waring wrote and illustrated a short story with close friend and novelist, Jessie Redmon Fauset. Fauset accompanied Waring throughout her travels in France at this time. Waring wrote the short story, "Dark Algiers and White," for The Crisis magazine of the NAACP, and it was later published.

She not only participated in national shows but also local ones in the Philadelphia area. She, Allan R. Freelon and Henry B. Jones provided artwork for an exhibition by the Negro Study Club at the Berean School in 1930.

The Metropolitan Museum of Art's 2024 exhibit, The Harlem Renaissance and Transatlantic Modernism, reintroduced Waring's work to a new audience. The show displayed nine of Waring's paintings, a number of which had been in the collections of family members.

Waring's painting, Girl with Pomegranate, is used as the cover image for the exhibit's catalogue edited by Denise Murrell. As the publisher describes, "this publication also includes works by lesser-known contributors, including Laura Wheeler Waring and Samuel Joseph Brown, Jr., who took a more classical approach to depicting Black subjects with dignity, interiority, and gravitas."

== Personal life ==
Laura Wheeler married Walter Waring on June 23, 1927. He was from Philadelphia and worked in the public school system as a teacher. When they first married, money was scarce, so they delayed their honeymoon for two years. In 1929, the newlyweds traveled to France, spending more than two months there. They had no children. Wheeler was known to shun publicity.

== Death ==
Waring died on February 3, 1948, in her Philadelphia home after a long illness. She was interred at Eden Cemetery in Collingdale, Pennsylvania. A year later, Howard University Gallery of Art in Washington, D.C. held an exhibition of art in her honor.

Waring's work was included in the 2015 exhibition We Speak: Black Artists in Philadelphia, 1920s-1970s at the Woodmere Art Museum.

== Works ==
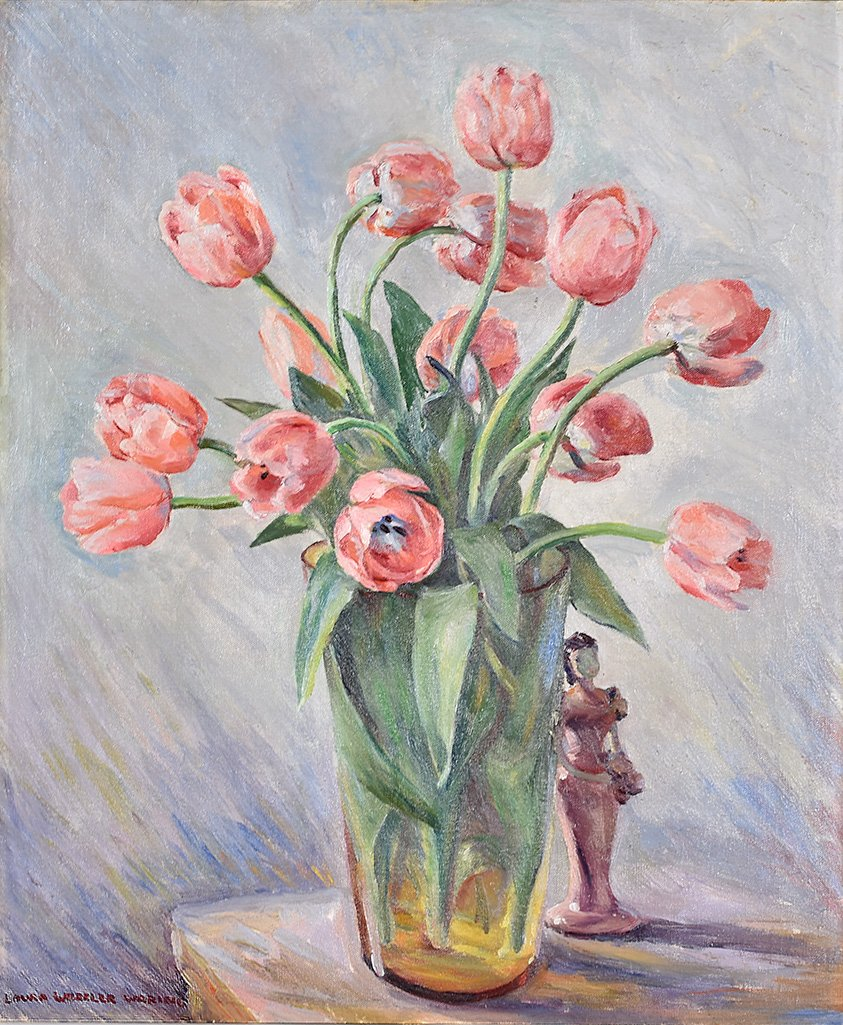
Still Life with Tulips and Figurine

- Heirlooms (watercolor) (1916)
- Anna Washington Derry (1927)
- A Dance in the Round (1935)
- Nude in Relief (1937)
- Jazz Dancer 1 (1939)
- Still Life with Tulips and Figurine (ca.1940)
- Portrait of Alma Thomas (1945)

== Selected portraits ==
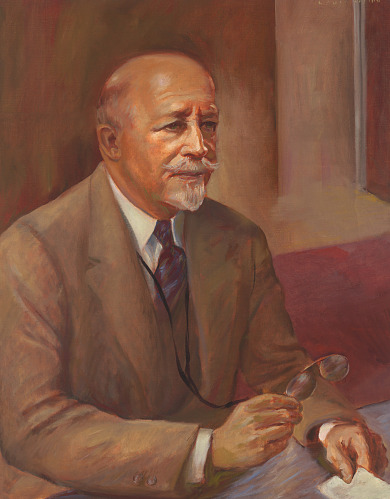
W. E. B. Du Bois

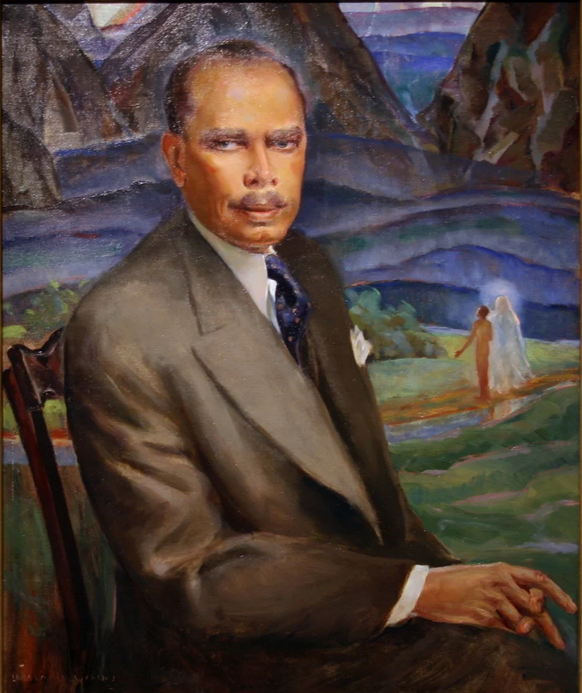
James Weldon Johnson

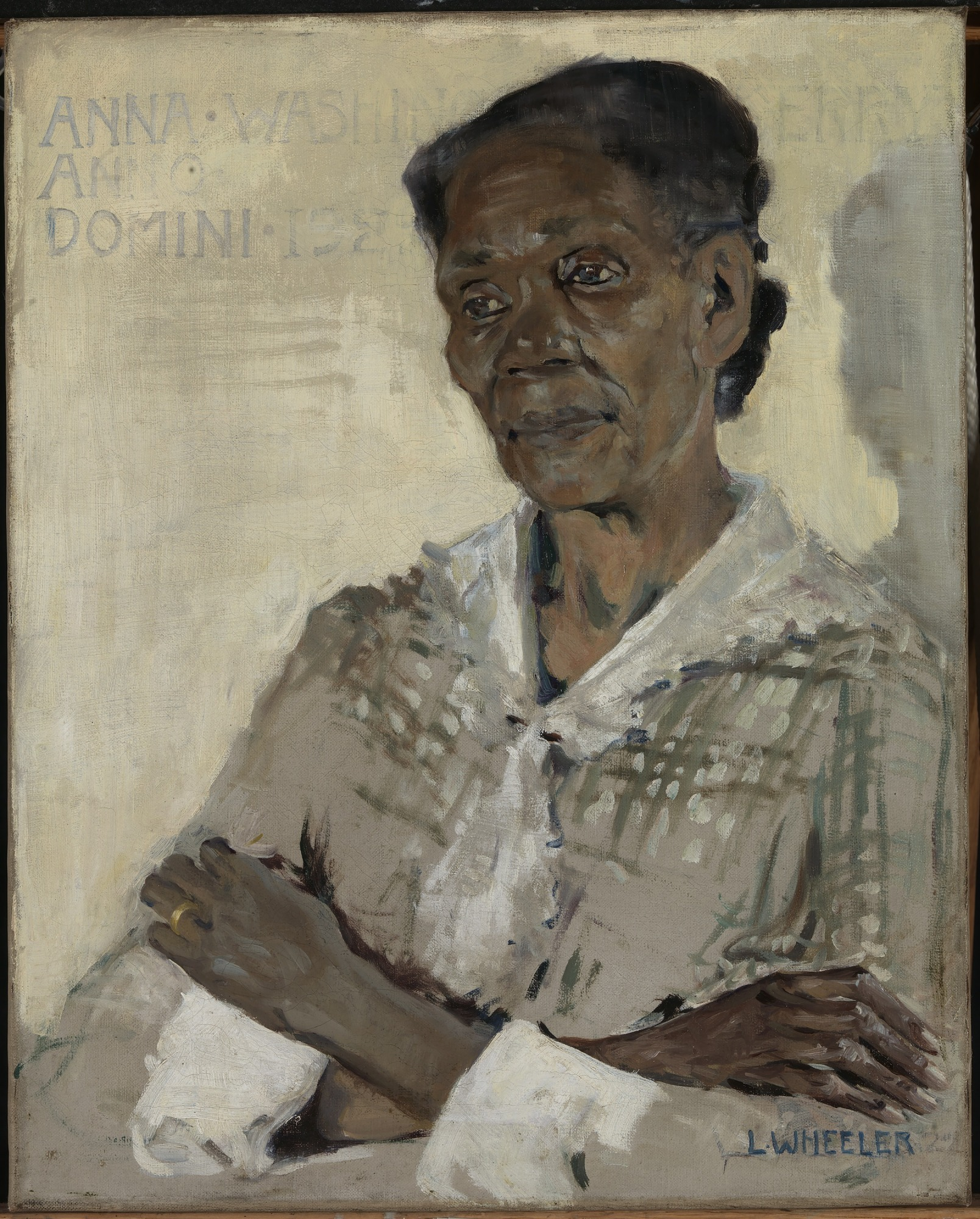
Anna Washington Derry

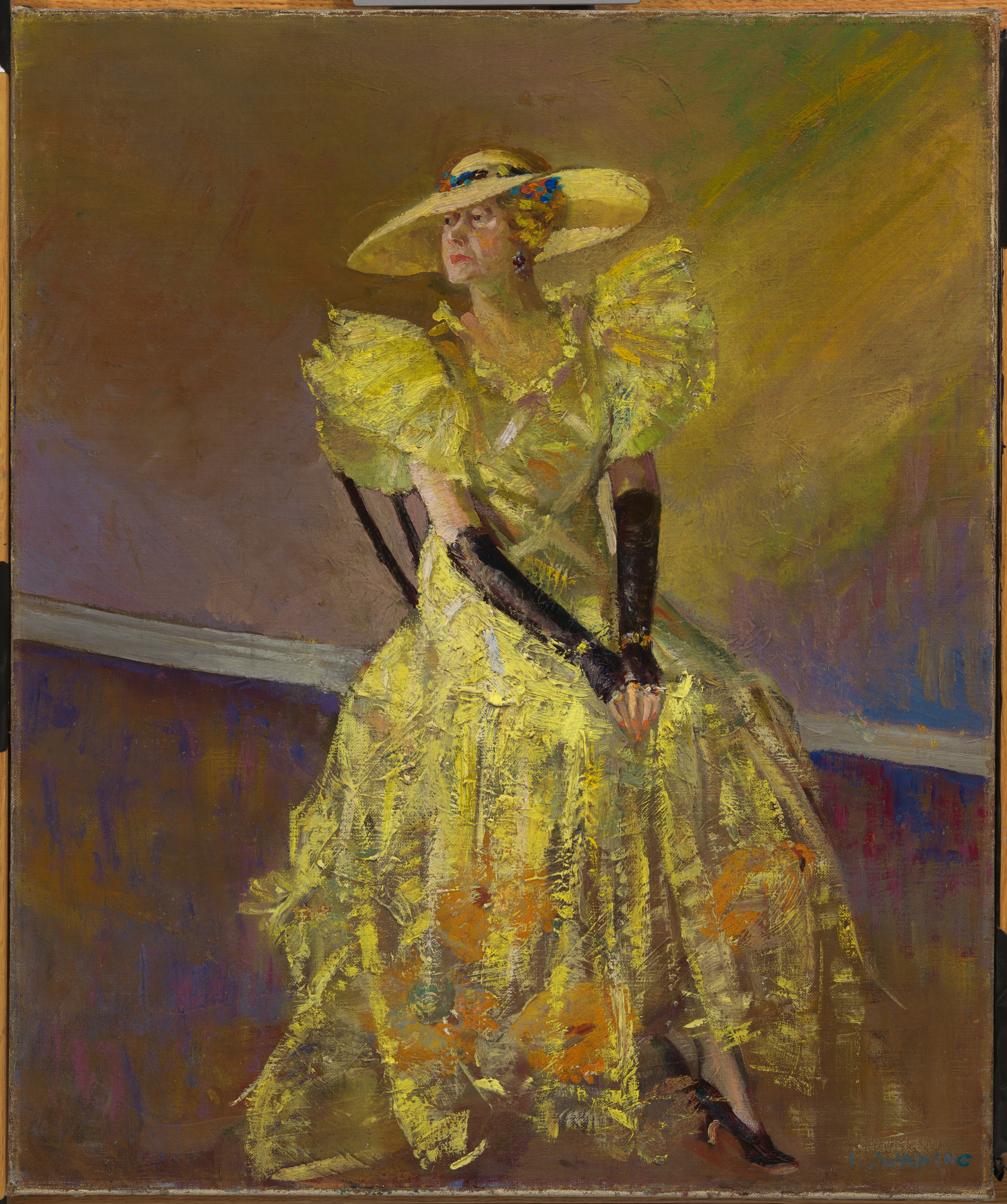
Alice Dunbar Nelson

== Selected illustrations ==
"Once We Exchange Adieu." 1925.	Drawing after Peter Paul Rubens's Adoration of the Magi (1626 1627). 1931.
