= Julius Bloch =

American painter

- Born: May 12, 1888; Kehl, Germany
- Died: August 22, 1966 (aged 78); Philadelphia, Pennsylvania, United States
- Occupation: Painter

Julius Thiengen Bloch (May 12, 1888 – August 22, 1966) was born in Kehl, Germany.

== Biography ==
His German Jewish family moved to the United States in 1893, settling in Philadelphia. A social realist painter, his work was part of the painting event in the art competition at the 1932 Summer Olympics.

In 1934, Eleanor Roosevelt purchased his oil painting The Young Worker in an exhibition of the Public Works of Art Project at the Corcoran Gallery of Art in Washington, D.C., for President Franklin D. Roosevelt's executive offices.
