= Niggerati =

Harlem renaissance intellectual group

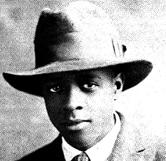
Wallace Thurman

Niggerati was the name used, with deliberate irony, by Wallace Thurman for the group of young African-American artists and intellectuals of the Harlem Renaissance. "Niggerati" is a portmanteau of "nigger" and "literati". The rooming house where he lived, and where that group often met, was similarly christened Niggerati Manor. The group included Zora Neale Hurston, Langston Hughes, and several of the people behind Thurman's journal FIRE!! (which lasted for one issue in 1926), such as Richard Bruce Nugent (the associate editor of the journal), Jonathan Davis, Gwendolyn Bennett, and Aaron Douglas.

The African-American bourgeoisie tried to distance itself from the slavery of the past and sought social equality and racial integration. The Niggerati themselves appeared to be relatively comfortable with their diversity of gender, skin color, and background. After producing FIRE!!, which failed because of a lack of funding, Thurman persuaded the Niggerati to produce another magazine, Harlem. This, too, lasted only a single issue.

== Origin ==
In his autobiographical novel, Infants of the Spring, Thurman referred to the Harlem literati, whose pretensions he often considered to be spurious and whose achievements he often regarded as second-rate, as the "Niggerati". (In the novel, Sweetie May Carr, a character modelled on the real-life Hurston, christens the Harlem rooming house where Dr Parkes (modelled on the real life Alain Locke) establishes a salon of artists, "Niggerati Manor", just as Thurman's own rooming house was in real life.) Thurman himself was infamous amongst those literati, although popular amongst the younger, bohemian, crowd. Thurman rejected what he called "society Negroes". He himself, as many others of the literati did, would hold parties on Saturday nights, which Langston Hughes described in The Big Sea, observing that "at Wallace Thurman's you met the bohemians of both Harlem and the Village". Recalling the days of Niggerati Manor, Theophilus Lewis wrote:

Those were the days when Niggerati Manor was the talk of the town. The story got out that the bathtubs in the house were always packed with sour mash, while gin flowed from all the water taps and the flush boxes were filled with needle beer. It was said that the inmates of the house spent wild nights in tuft hunting and in the diversion of the cities of the plains and delirious days fleeing from pink elephants. [...] Needless to say, the rumours were not wholly groundless; Where there is smoke there must be fire. In the case of Niggerati Manor, a great deal more smoke came out of the windows than was warranted by the size of the fire in the house.

— Theophilus Lewis,

All three of Hughes, Hurston, and Thurman enjoyed the shock value of referring to themselves as "the Niggerati". Hurston's biographer Valerie Boyd described it as "an inspired moniker that was simultaneously self-mocking and self-glorifying, and sure to shock the stuffy black bourgeoisie". Hurston was actually the coiner of the name. The quickest wit in what was a very witty group - which encompassed Helene Johnson, Countee Cullen, Augusta Savage, Dorothy West (then a teacher), Harold Jackman, and John P. Davis (a law student at the time), as well as hangers-on, friends, and acquaintances - Hurston dubbed herself the "Queen of the Niggerati". In addition to Niggerati Manor, the rooming house at 267 West 136th Street where both Thurman and Hughes lived, Niggerati meetings were held at Hurston's apartment, with a pot on the stove, into which attendees were expected to contribute ingredients for stew. She also cooked okra, or fried Florida eel.

Whilst Hughes, Hurston, and Thurman were comfortable with the appellation, others were less so. Cullen, for example, found Carl Van Vechten's novel Nigger Heaven so offensive that he refused to talk to him for 14 years. Hurston, though, had no trouble with language that challenged the sensibilities of others. She dubbed the well-heeled white liberals who were involved in the Harlem Renaissance "Negrotarians" (cf. rotarian).

== FIRE!! ==
First and only issue of the 1926 literary magazine "Fire!!"

FIRE!! itself represented the aesthetic frustrations of the Niggerati. Its single issue was published in November 1926, a year after the publication of Alain Locke's The New Negro. Whilst The New Negro was viewed by the Niggerati as subtle propaganda, appropriating their talents for racial propagandist purposes, FIRE!! was intended to be "devoted to the younger Negro artists", and was edited, paid for, and published by the Niggerati themselves, with the intention both of being purely aesthetic and of causing outrage amongst black literary critics. The journal's title came from a poem that Hughes had written, which was a sinner's lament in the fashion of a Negro spiritual. In a letter written to Locke, Hurston stated that there needed to be "more outlets for Negro fire", and the Niggerati distanced themselves even from Locke, declining his offer of patronage for the journal.

=== Organization ===
In addition to Nugent; Bennett, Douglas, Thurman, Hurston, and Hughes formed the journal's editorial board, with Thurman at the head. Davis was the business manager. Each editor was supposed to contribute 50 dollars towards the publication costs, although only three (not including Hurston) actually did. Thurman signed an I.O.U. for the printer, making him personally liable for the bill of nearly $1,000. He borrowed $150 from the Harlem Community Church, and another $150 from the Mutual League, only to be mugged on a street corner in Harlem, losing both all of the money and his clothing. For the next four years, Thurman's pay was attached in order to pay the debt. Hurston solicited subscriptions on a folklore-collecting trip to the South in 1927, in order to help, and both she and Hughes submitted essays to World Tomorrow, which had loaned money to FIRE!, to repay that loan.

This shaky financial foundation was symptomatic of the troubles that beset the journal, one of the most major of which was that none of the Niggerati had time to work on it. By the Autumn of 1926, Hurston had begun a course at Barnard, Hughes had returned to college in Pennsylvania, Davis was at Harvard and occupied with editing Crisis, Bennett was at Howard and occupied with her column for Opportunity, and even Thurman had taken a new job editing World Tomorrow magazine. Nugent and Douglas were artists, not editors. One of Nugent's stories, submitted for publication, was destroyed accidentally whilst stored at Hurston's apartment, and he had to rewrite it. He did so on a roll of toilet paper, which he gave to Thurman. Nugent himself stated that the most amazing thing about FIRE!! was that it was ever published at all.

In a final irony, the printer gave the entire print run of the magazine to the Niggerati, in the hope that they would sell better in quantity, only for several hundred copies to be lost in a fire in the basement in which they were stored. Hurston later commented "I suppose that 'Fire' has gone to ashes quite, but I still think the idea is good.".

=== Content ===
The one issue of FIRE!! to be published contained stories by several of the Niggerati, most of which had transgressions of moral and aesthetic boundaries as their themes. Thurman's story Cordelia the Crude was a story about a sixteen-year-old black girl becoming a prostitute — an image that would have outraged black critics of the time, whose view of black female sexuality was that images of it should be moral. Nugent's story was Smoke, Lilies and Jade, an overtly homoerotic story with black and Latino protagonists, and the first such story published by an African American. Hurston submitted two stories, one of which, her play Color Struck (a reworked version of what she had won the 1925 'Opportunity contest with), Thurman had considered printing under a pen name, in order to prevent the issue being too "Zoraish". Like the other stories, Color Struck condemned the bourgeois attitude of envying whites, on biological and intellectual grounds, its subject being that of a woman who was so conscious of the colour of her skin that she missed out on the love of a good man. Her other submission was a short story entitled Sweat, which Hemenway praises as being "a remarkable work, her best fiction of the period", and observes that such stories could have led to the magazine's eventual success, had it not suffered from the other problems. A lesser known contributor to ‘’FIRE!!’’ and associate of the Niggerati was Edward Silvera. Silvera wrote the poems “Jungle Taste” and “Finality” featured in the Flame from the Dark Tower poetry section of FIRE!! alongside poems by Hurston and Hughes. “Jungle Taste” is often studied by Harlem Renaissance experts although little else is documented about Edward Silvera.

=== Reception ===
The Niggerati sought to challenge borgeoise attitudes with FIRE!!, and intended it (in Thurman's own words from his solicitation letters) to be "provocative ... to provide the shocks necessary to encourage new types of artistic interest and new types of artistic energy". However, their efforts failed. They were not taken very seriously. Most of the negative reactions were little stronger than slaps on the wrist. Locke criticized their "effete echoes of contemporary decadence" and yet praised their anti-Puritanism. The NAACP even handled some of the journal's prepublication publicity. Du Bois, editor of Crisis, simply ignored them.

The way in which the Niggerati thought that FIRE!! was received reveals much about their intent in publishing it. Hughes wrote in The Big Sea that "None of the older Negro intellectuals would have anything to do with FIRE. Dr. Du Bois in Crisis roasted it.". In fact, Du Bois did no such thing. The only mention that FIRE!! received was a brief announcement in the January 1927 issue, calling it "a beautiful piece of printing" that was "strikingly illustrated by Aaron Douglas" and concluding "We bespeak for it wide support.". Hughes thought that Du Bois panned FIRE!! because he expected him to pan it, that being the reaction that he and the other Niggerati had intended to elicit. Nugent reported that once all initial submissions had been made, Thurman had asked the group for something that would get the journal banned in Boston, which led to the inclusion of Cordelia the Crude and Smoke, Lilies and Jade.

== Harlem ==
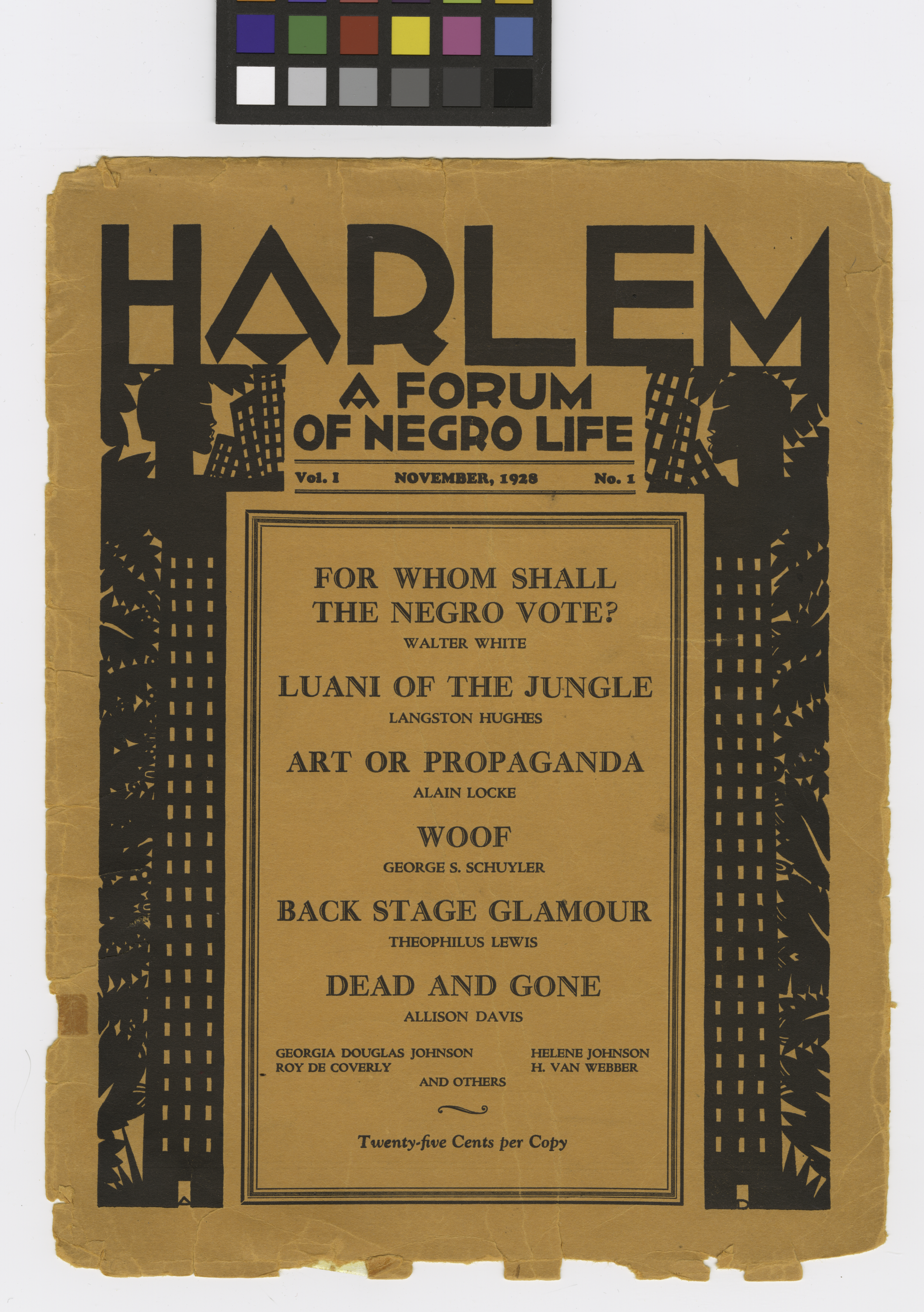
Cover image of first issue of the 1928 Negro literary journal "Harlem: A forum of Negro life"

The Niggerati's next magazine, Harlem, published in November 1928, was subtly different in tone to FIRE!!. Whilst still choosing themes that critics considered inappropriate and shocking, the magazine was more politically oriented, was more commercially viable, and had a wider variety of articles, stories, advertisements, and other contents. It also had a different look, and lacked the inter-generational rhetoric of FIRE!!. Thurman himself described it as a "wholly new type of magazine", with a new outlook, celebrating "a new day in the history of the American Negro". Thurman aimed the magazine squarely at the New Negroes envisioned by Locke and others. Unlike FIRE!!, Harlem was not intended solely a vehicle for the Niggerati themselves, but was intended to accept articles from anyone, as long as the authors had skill.

=== Organization ===
Most of the editors of FIRE!! also contributed to Harlem. They also approached other writers. One such was Nella Larsen, a friend of Peterson. Peterson had wanted no part in another magazine published by Thurman, and had been approached by Nugent and Scholley Alexander, to write a monthly theatrical column, under the pretext that Alexander was the editor. Upon receiving a thank-you letter with Thurman's name as editor on the letterhead, she withdrew, despite pleas from Alexander acknowledging Thurman's "selfish treatment of those who have helped him gain a place in the literary world" and stating that he would not let Thurman run amok. Alexander asked Peterson to ask her friends "to forbear — to with-hold their criticism until they have the first issue at hand to criticize" (original emphasis and underlining). Larsen also declined, on the grounds that she was not going to be paid for her submissions, confessing that her ultimate goal in writing was "money". "I write so slowly and with such great reluctance that it seems a waste of time.", she also observed.

=== Content ===
The first issue of Harlem contained essays by Lewis, Locke, Nugent, and Walter Francis White; poems by Helene Johnson, Georgia Douglas Johnson, Alice Dunbar Nelson, and Effie Newsom; stories by Roy de Coverly and George Little; and illustrations. Although intended to be more moderate than FIRE!!, Thurman abandoned this stance in later pages of the issue. His review of Larsen's Quicksand gave closer attention to the review of the novel given by Du Bois than it did to the novel itself, saying that Larsen "no doubt pleases Dr. Du Bois for she stays in her own sphere and writes about the sort of people one can invite to one's home without losing one's social prestige. She doesn't give white people the impression that all Negroes are gin drinkers, cabaret hounds and of the half world. Her Negroes are all of the upper class. And how!".

=== Reception ===
Like FIRE!!, Harlem also failed, with the readership responding unfavourably. Nugent wrote to Peterson after the publication of the first issue, expressing his disappointment and blaming the failure on "Wally's" editorship. According to Nugent, neither Alexander nor Douglas had been able, nor had had the strength, to counteract Thurman. Nugent himself had been on tour, with the cast of Porgy, whilst the issue was being edited. Nugent distanced himself from the magazine, and wanted it made clear to Van Vechten that he had not been "in any way responsible for the perpetration of Harlem". In December 1928, Thurman resigned from the magazine's editorial board.
