= New Negro =

Term popularized during the Harlem Renaissance

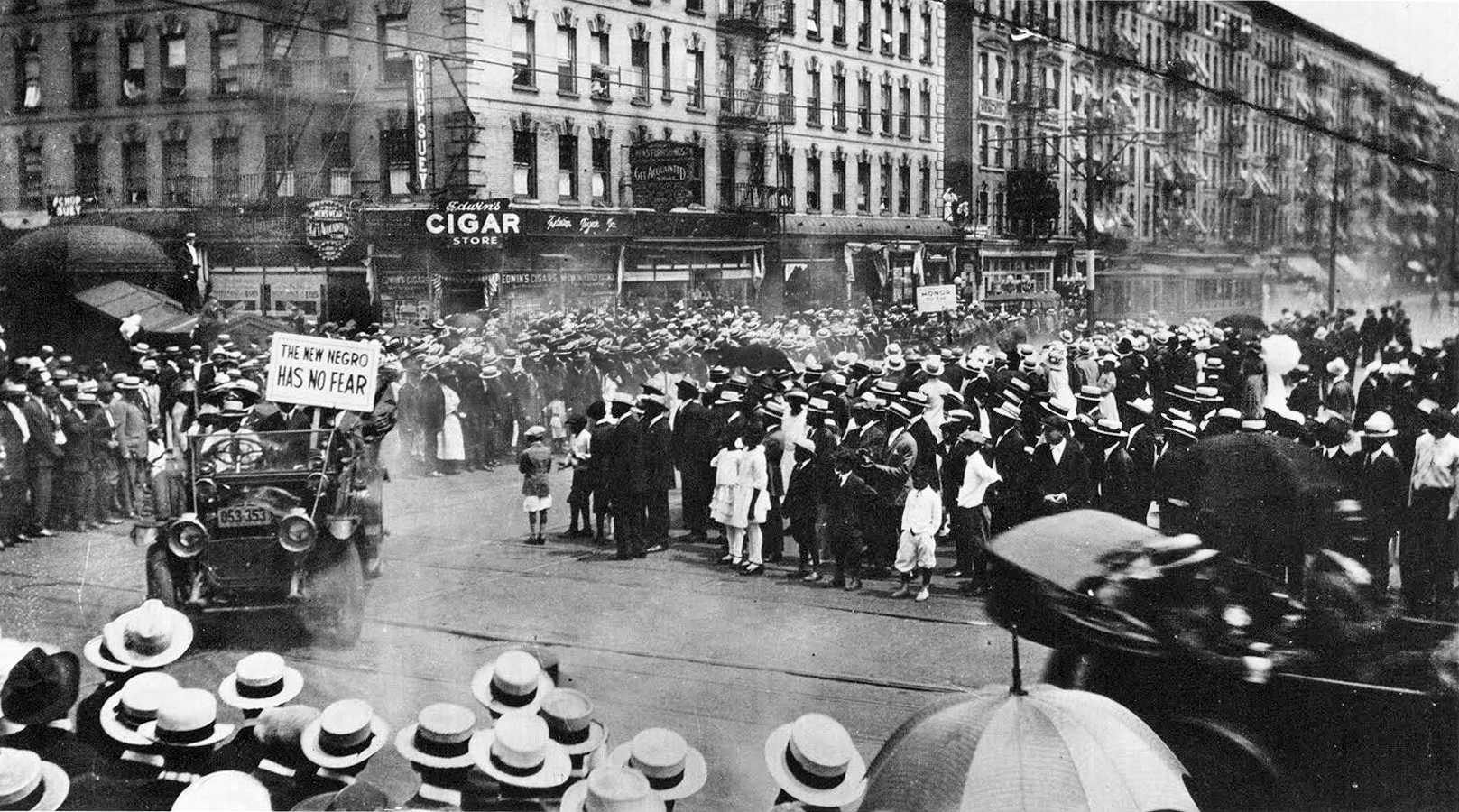
A Universal Negro Improvement Association parade in Harlem, 1920. A sign on a car says "The New Negro Has No Fear".

"New Negro" is a term popularized during the Harlem Renaissance implying a more outspoken advocacy of dignity and a refusal to submit quietly to the practices and laws of Jim Crow racial segregation. The term "New Negro" was made popular by Alain LeRoy Locke in his anthology The New Negro.

== Definition ==
Historically, the term is present in African American discourses since 1895, but is most recognized as a central term of the Harlem Renaissance (1917–1928). The term has a broad relevance to the period in U.S. history known as the Post-Reconstruction, whose beginnings were marked symbolically by the notorious compromise of 1877 and whose impact upon black American lives culminated in the 1896 Supreme Court decision, Plessy v. Ferguson, which practically obliterated the gains African Americans had made through the 14th and 15th Amendments. Henry Louis Gates Jr., who in 1988 provided a comprehensive treatment of this evolution from 1895 to 1925, notes that "blacks regained a public voice, louder and more strident than it had been even during slavery."

More recently, Gates and Gene Andrew Jarrett have discussed a New Negro era of a longer duration, from 1892 through 1938, and Brent Hayes Edwards has pushed investigations of New Negro culture far beyond Harlem, noting that "the 'New Negro' movement [was] at the same time a 'new' black internationalism." This internationalism developed in relation to informal cultural exchange among black figures in the United States, France, and the Caribbean. New Negro cultural internationalism also grew out of New Negro work in the United States's official international diplomacy.

== Between 1919 and 1925 ==
With the end of the First World War and the rise of the Harlem Renaissance, the term "New Negro" was widely publicized as a synonym for African Americans who will radically defend their interests against violence and inequality. An article in The Messenger journal published in August 1920, entitled "The New Negro - What Is He?" by The Editors, provides a clear picture of the term, in which they describe that the "New Negro" will be radical and self-defending to pursue the right to political and social equality, unlike the gentleness of the Old Negro who is satisfied with the status quo.

Subsequently, in 1925, Alain Locke published the article "Enter the New Negro" and defined "New Negro" as "augury of a new democracy in American culture." Locke took the term to a new level. Locke described the negative impression blacks had of their racial values due to the long-term repression of a racist society and how it also made African Americans distort their social status, and that they all needed to take a new attitude to look at themselves. He pointed out that the thinking new Blacks committed to combat stereotypes, awaken black national consciousness and pride, as well as improve the social status of African Americans.

== Origins of the term ==
=== 1895 ===
1895 was a crucial year. Du Bois, with a PhD from Harvard in hand, embarked on his long career in scholarship and civil rights, Booker T. Washington made his Atlanta Exposition speech and Frederick Douglass died after having made some of the bitterest and most despairing speeches on "race." Despite their rhetorical and ideological differences, these three leaders were speaking up during the 1890s, the decade described by African American historian Rayford Logan as the "nadir" of African American history and marked by nearly 2,000 documented lynchings.

New Negroes were seen invariably as men and women (but mostly men) of middle-class orientation who often demanded their legal rights as citizens, but almost always wanted to craft new images that would subvert and challenge old stereotypes. This can be seen in the 1895 editorial in the Cleveland Gazette and commentaries in other black newspapers. Books like A New Negro for a New Century (1900) authored by Booker T. Washington, Fannie Barrier Williams and N. B. Wood; and The New Negro (1916), represent the concept.

=== The First World War ===
For African Americans, World War I highlighted the widening gap between U.S. rhetoric regarding "the war to make the world safe for democracy" and the reality of disenfranchised and exploited black farmers in the South or the poor and alienated residents of the Northern slums. African-American soldiers faced discrimination because the US government conceded that it would not admit African American soldiers to white training camps. To help these discriminated African American soldiers, the NAACP helped establish segregated training camps in Des Moines, Iowa, and Spingarn. However, the treatment of African American soldiers was still deplorable, and most of them were assigned to labor units after the basic training. However, in France, for example, the black soldiers experienced the kind of freedom they had never known in the U.S.

When World War I began, African Americans wanted to demonstrate their patriotism to the country. However, they were turned away from the military service because the military only accepted a certain amount of African Americans. It wasn't until the war had actually started, that the military realized more people were needed, so African Americans were being drafted and accepted into the military. This was seen as a start for the "New Negro" to show that they are wanting to be equal and they are willing to go to war to prove that they are worthy enough to be equal like everyone else in the country.

African Americans dealt with discrimination in the military and was segregated from the white people and went to different training locations. The military created two different divisions solely for African Americans, which were the 92nd division and the 93rd division. The 92nd division was made of the officers and draftees. The 93rd division's helped out the French Army during the war and had a different experience than the 92nd division. The 93rd division had the most famous infantry which was the 369th Infantry and they were known as the "Harlem Hellfighters." The 369th Infantry repelled the German offensive and fought alongside the 16th Division of the French Army. They fought for 191 days, which was the longest and were the first Americans to be awarded the Croix de Guerre medal by France.

After the war ended, racial tensions began to boil over in the United States. Having experienced freedom and respect in France they had never known at home, African American soldiers were determined to fight for equal treatment but found that discrimination against blacks was just as present as it was before the war. A prime, but not isolated, example of this lingering racism is the case of African American soldier Wilbur Little. He was lynched in Blakely, Georgia upon his return from service after ignoring threats from a group of white men to never wear his uniform in public.

In addition to this racially motivated violence there were African Americans flooding into the north in huge numbers, increasing segregation in the North and the regeneration of the Ku Klux Klan, all of which contributed to the rising racial tension which resulted in the riots that affected several major cities in the "red summer" of 1919.

Because of the discrimination witnessed after World War I, the philosophy of the civil rights movement shifted from the accommodationist approach of Booker T. Washington to the militant advocacy of W.E.B. Du Bois. This shift of philosophy helped to create the New Negro Movement of the 1920s, which "promoted a renewed sense of racial pride, cultural self-expression, economic independence, and progressive politics." For many African Americans, World War I represents a transition from the time of the "Old Negro to the brave New Negro."

=== New Negro Movement ===
In 1916–17, Hubert Harrison founded the New Negro Movement. In 1917, he established the first organization (The Liberty League) and the first newspaper (The Voice) of the "New Negro Movement" and this movement energized Harlem and beyond with its race-conscious and class-conscious demands for political equality, an end to segregation and lynching as well as calls for armed self-defense when appropriate. Therefore, Harrison, who also edited The New Negro in 1919 and authored When Africa Awakes: The 'Inside Story' of the Stirrings and Strivings of the New Negro in the Western World in 1920, is called the "father of Harlem Radicalism."

The NAACP played an important role in the awakening of the Negro Renaissance which was the cultural component of the New Negro Movement. The NAACP officials W.E.B. Du Bois, James Weldon Johnson, Walter White, and Jessie Redmon Fauset provided financial support, aesthetic guidance, and literature to this cultural awakening. According to the NAACP, this cultural component of the New Negro Movement provided the first display of African-American cultural self-expression.

In several essays included in the anthology The New Negro (1925), which grew out of the 1924 special issue of Survey Graphic on Harlem, editor Alain Locke contrasted the "Old Negro" with the "New Negro" by stressing African American assertiveness and self-confidence during the years following World War I and the Great Migration. Race pride had already been part of literary and political self-expression among African Americans in the nineteenth century, as reflected in the writings of Martin Delany, Bishop Henry Turner, Frances E.W. Harper, Frederick Douglass and Pauline Hopkins. However, it found a new purpose and definition in the journalism, fiction, poetry, music, sculpture and paintings of a host of figures associated with the Harlem Renaissance.

The term "New Negro" inspired a wide variety of responses from its diverse participants and promoters. A militant African American editor indicated in 1920 how this "new line of thought, a new method of approach" included the possibility that "the intrinsic standard of Beauty and aesthetics does not rest in the white race" and that "a new racial love, respect and consciousness may be created." It was felt that African Americans were poised to assert their own agency in culture and politics instead of just remaining a "problem" or "formula" for others to debate about.

The New Negroes of the 1920s, the Talented Tenth, included poets, novelists and Blues singers creating their art out of Negro folk heritage and history; black political leaders fighting against corruption and for expanded opportunities for African Americans; businessmen working toward the possibilities of a "black metropolis" and Garveyites dreaming of a homeland in Africa. All of them shared in their desire to shed the image of servility and inferiority of the shuffling "Old Negro" and achieve a new image of pride and dignity.

=== Alain Locke ===
No one has articulated the hopes and possibilities associated with the idea and ideal of the "New Negro" more than the Harvard-trained philosophy professor Alain Locke, who later described himself as the "midwife" to aspiring young black writers of the 1920s. According to Locke, The New Negro, whose publication by Albert and Charles Boni in December 1925 symbolizes the culmination of the first stage of the New Negro Renaissance in literature, was put together "to document the New Negro culturally and socially - to register the transformations of the inner and outer life of the Negro in America that have so significantly taken place in the last few years."

The anthology had already sold 42,000 copies in its earlier incarnation as the March 1925 special Harlem issue on Harlem of the Survey Graphic magazine, a record unsurpassed by the Survey until World War II. Highlighting its national and international scope, Locke compared the New Negro movement with the "nascent movements of folk expression and self-determination" that were taking place "in India, in China, in Egypt, Ireland, Russia, Bohemia, Palestine and Mexico."

Locke's philosophy of cultural pluralism is analogous to the thinking of many of his white contemporaries, especially cultural pluralists such as Waldo Frank, V. F. Calverton, Randolph Bourne and Van Wyck Brooks. Sharing the optimism of other progressive reformers, Locke recognized that "the conditions that are molding a New Negro are [also] molding a new American attitude." He defined as the creed of his own generation its belief in "the efficacy of collective effort, in race co-operation."

In Alain Locke's anthology The New Negro, of one of the main reoccurring themes is a distinction between the "New World" and the "Old World." Locke points out "Harlem's significance" along with explaining what it stood for by saying that, "it's a racial awakening on a national and perhaps even a world scale". Locke wanted to document what was going on in the mind of African Americans. Locke had an idea to redo the "New Negro" and this is something he promotes throughout his writing.

Locke had an idea of the "internal vs the external negro". He brought up points about how African Americans have always been generalized and wanted to represent more voices from within the community. The outer life with the racial standards. Locke acknowledged that some progress had been made for African Americans politically, land owning and slavery etc. Locke really wanted to document the uplift. Internally wanted to shift from the past slave movement more towards the psychology behind it all. Locke's explanation of the "New Negro" gives one a deep understanding of the term and meaning, especially during the period of the Harlem Renaissance.

Like the black political leaders of the period, Locke seems to have believed that the American system would ultimately work for African Americans, but he refused to take cognizance of the disagreeable political leverage the system called for. Such an approach implied an excessive dependence of any black hopes for political change or reform upon white men of influence and their good intentions. In terms of art and literature, Locke saw no conflict between being "American" and being "Negro," but rather an opportunity to enrich both through cultural reciprocity. In a way, Locke was reinterpreting Du Bois' "double consciousness" concept for aesthetic and cultural uses.

It seems there was enough room in Locke's view for many different kinds of talents to exist and thrive together. Locke also did not see any direct connection between African arts that had influenced the works of many European artists such as Picasso. For him, the most important lesson the black artist could derive from African art was "not cultural inspiration or technical innovations, but the lesson of a classic background, the lesson of discipline, of style, of technical control."

As W. E. B. Du Bois himself recognized in his response to Locke's New Negro, the concept validated at one level the rejection of the accommodationist politics and ideology represented by Booker T. Washington and his followers around the start of the 20th century when despite Washington's access to the White House and mainstream politicians, violence against African Americans had continued unabated at a disturbing level with little progress in the area of civil rights and economic opportunities.

== Different points of view ==
At the same time, there were also voices of doubt and scepticism. Eric D. Walrond, "the young West Indian writer of "Tropic Death" (1926), found all contemporary black leaders inadequate or ineffective in dealing with the cultural and political aspirations of black masses."

In 1923, in his essay The New Negro Faces America, he declared the New Negro to be "race-conscious. He does not want . . . to be like the white man. He is coming to realize the great possibilities within himself. The New Negro, who does not want to go back to Africa, is fondly cherishing an ideal – and that is, that the time will come when America will look upon the Negro not as a savage with an inferior mentality, but as a civilized man." According to Walrond, the "rank and file of Negroes are opposed to Garveyism; dissatisfied with the personal vituperation and morbid satire of Mr. Du Bois and prone to discount Major [Robert] Moton's Tuskegee as a monument of respectable reaction."

By 1929, Wallace Thurman, the bohemian and brilliant leader of young writers associated with the "Niggerati Manor" as well as journals such as Fire!! and Harlem, referred to the New Negro phenomenon as a "white American fad that had already come and gone". In several pieces of journalism and literary essays, Thurman castigated the kind of interest both whites and black middle-class readers invested in the work of younger black writers, making it harder for them to think and create independently.

In one such essay, The Negro Literary Renaissance which was included in "Aunt Hagar's Children", Thurman sums up the situation thus: "Everyone was having a grand time. The millennium was about to dawn. The second emancipation seemed inevitable. Then the excitement began to die down and Negroes as well as whites began to take stock of that in which they had reveled. The whites shrugged their shoulders and began seeking for some new fad. Negroes stood by, a little subdued, a little surprised, torn between being proud that certain of their group had achieved distinction, and being angry because a few of them arrived ones had ceased to be what the group considered 'constructive,' having in the interim, produced works that went against the grain, in that they did not wholly qualify to the adjective 'respectable.'"

Again in 1929, Thurman had begun his second novel, "Infants of the Spring" (1932), a satire in which he took himself and his peers to task for decadence and lack of discipline, declaring all his contemporaries except Jean Toomer as mere journeymen. And while he admired Alain Locke for his sympathy and support for the young Negro writers, the salon scene in chapter 21 signals Locke's failure at organizing the highly individualistic young writers into a cohesive movement.

Beyond the lack of consensus on the significance of the term "New Negro" during the Harlem Renaissance, many later commentators such as Harold Cruse considered it politically naive or overly optimistic.

As late as 1938, Locke was defending his views against attacks from John P. Davis and others that his emphasis was primarily on the "psychology of the masses" and not on offering a solution to the "Negro problem." In dismissing the construction of the New Negro as a dubious venture in renaming, as merely a "bold and audacious act of language," Gates confirms Gilbert Osofsky's earlier criticism that the New Negroes of the 1920s helped to support new white stereotypes of black life, different from, but no more valid or accurate than the old ones.

== Legacy ==
During the Harlem Renaissance, the term “New Negro” carried on a legacy of motivation and ambition to African Americans, to help them pursue greater things, things that were at one point were strongly discouraged to the African American community.

The term was also significant for defining black leadership in creative, intellectual, and political pursuits in the U.S. as well as on a global scale. The middle-class leadership of NAACP and Urban League were deeply suspicious of the flamboyant and demagogic Marcus Garvey, who in turn saw Du Bois and others as dark-skinned whites. Yet all of them subscribed to some form of Pan-Africanism. Alain Locke and Charles S. Johnson rejected cultural separatism and endorsed a hybridity derived from the marriage of black experience and Euro-American aesthetic forms.

In filmmaking, during the early 20th Century, it was very rare to see African Americans playing movie cast members, and if they were, they were generally portrayed to represent the Old South and/or were criminals. During the middle of the century, the film industry began opening up more opportunities to African Americans. They were able to play a more diverse set of roles and began participating in several different genres.

In the political scene, between 1901 and 1928, there had been no African Americans elected to the United States House of Representatives. In 1929, this streak was broken when Oscar Stanton De Priest was elected to represent the State of Illinois in the House. However, he did not only represent his state, but the African American overcoming of oppression and their regained power in politics. After the New Negro movement, the mean time African American representative served in office increased from a measly two years to six.

In education, Howard University called the post New Negro movement “the capstone of Negro education”. In the early 1930s, historically black Howard University began receiving federal grant money for the first time in an amount that exceeded $1 million. In addition, Howard University was the first university ever to receive more than $1 million for a science facility.
