= Richard Bruce Nugent =

American writer and artist (1906–1987)

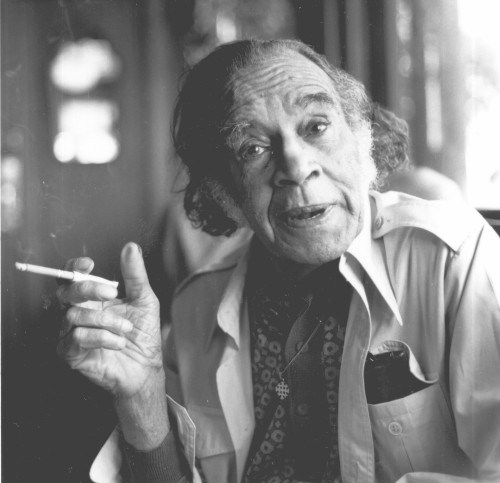
- Nugent in 1982
- Born: July 2, 1906; Washington, D.C., US
- Died: May 27, 1987 (aged 80); Hoboken, New Jersey, US
- Other names: Bruce Nugent, Richard Bruce, Ricardo Nugent di Dosceta
- Occupations: Writer, painter

Richard Bruce Nugent (July 2, 1906 – May 27, 1987) was a Black American modernist poet, writer, and painter of the Harlem Renaissance. Nugent was among the few Harlem artists of the time who were publicly out as gay. He was recognized initially for his short stories and paintings.

== Life ==
=== Early life ===
Richard Bruce Nugent was born in Washington, D.C., on July 2, 1906, to Richard H. Nugent Jr. and Pauline Minerva Bruce. He completed his schooling at Dunbar High School in 1920, and moved to New York following his father's death. Worried about his lack of interest in a stable job due to his artistic pursuits, his mother sent him back to Washington to live with his grandmother. Nugent passed as white to earn higher wages, going by the name Ricardo Nugen di Dosocta and giving an address located in the Spanish legation in Washington. During that time, he met writers Langston Hughes and Georgia Douglas Johnson. They became friends, influenced each other's works, and collaborated. Before committing his life to his art, Nugent worked several ordinary jobs, including that as a hat seller, a delivery boy, and a bellhop. During his time as a bellhop he fell in love with a hotel kitchen employee. It is believed that the character of Beauty from "Smoke, Lilies and Jade" is based on this man.

=== Marriage ===
He married Warren Marr II's sister, Grace, in 1952. Their marriage lasted until her suicide in 1969. Nugent was still open about his attraction to other men. Thomas Wirth, a contemporary and personal friend of Nugent, claimed that Grace loved him and was determined to change his sexuality.

=== Death ===
Nugent died of congestive heart failure on May 27, 1987, in Hoboken, New Jersey.

== Career ==
In 1925, Nugent's first works as a writer were published. These included his poem "Shadow" and his short story "Sahdji". Alain LeRoy Locke had asked Nugent to contribute to his anthology The New Negro. Nugent drew a picture of "a washing drawing of an African girl standing in a hut." Locke liked his picture and suggested that he create a story about it, which became "Sahdji". The short story takes place in East Africa and centers on a small tribe in the area of Warpuri. Sahdji is the wife of the Konombju, the tribe's chief, but her stepson, Mrabo, is in love with her. A devotee supporter of Mrabo named Numbo kills Konombju during a hunt, and Sahdji throws her body into Konombju's funeral pyre in mourning. This story was initially interpreted as a gay prose text. However, it is now regarded as an African morality tale that condemns murder. Locke encouraged Nugent to write the story again, and he created Sahdji: An African Ballet. It premiered at Howard University in the late 1920s and was also produced at the Eastman School of Music in Rochester in the summer of 1932. Nugent's works received honorable mentions.

During his career in Harlem, Nugent lived with writer Wallace Thurman from 1926 to 1928, publishing "Smoke, Lilies, and Jade" in Thurman's publication Fire!!. The short story was written in a modernist stream-of-consciousness style. Its subject matter was bisexuality and interracial male desire. Alain Locke criticized Nugent's "Smoke, Lilies and Jade" for promoting the effeminacy and decadence associated with homosexual writers.

Nugent was friends with writers Langston Hughes, Zora Neale Hurston, Aaron Douglas, Gwendolyn Bennett, John P. Davis, Aaron Douglas, and Georgia Douglas Johnson, all of whom frequented "Niggerati Manor". Nugent's work was influenced by these friendships, and they also helped get his work into various magazines.

Many of Nugent's illustrations were featured in publications such as Fire!!, along with his short stories. Four of his paintings were included in the William E. Harmon Foundation's exhibition of Black artists in 1931. His only standalone publication, Beyond Where the Stars Stood Still, was issued in a limited edition by Warren Marr II in 1945. Although written between 1928 and 1933, Nugent's novel, Gentleman Jigger, was not published until 2008 under Thomas H. Wirth's stewardship.

In the late 1930s, Nugent worked on the Federal Writers' Project, writing biographical sketches.

Nugent's novella, “Half High,” was published in 2023 by Multicanon Media. It is a roman à clef, re-imagining the life of Harlem Renaissance poet and writer Jean Toomer.

=== Harlem Cultural Council ===
Nugent attended the Community Planning Conference at Columbia University in 1964 as an invited speaker. The conference was held by the Borough President of Manhattan/Community Planning Board 10 and Columbia University. The conference's Cultural Planning workshop led to the formation of the Harlem Cultural Council to promote the arts in Harlem. Nugent and others founded the Harlem Cultural Council, which sought municipal and federal funds for the arts and mainly worked on construction for the Schomburg Center for Research in Black Culture. He was elected co-chair of the council. He also served as chair of the Program Committee until March 1967. Nugent also worked as an artist, performer, and commentator.

=== Dance ===
While he was more well known for his writing and illustrations, Nugent also spent many of his years touring as a dancer. He appeared in shows such as Run, Little Chillun (1933) and toured for two years in a production of Porgy. In the 1940s, he became a member of the William's Negro Ballet Company. He was also a part of other dance companies, dancing with Hemsley Winfield and Asadata Dafora, and danced in drag with the New Negro Art Theater Dance Troupe.

== Legacy ==
Nugent's work resurfaced in anthologies such as Michael J. Smith's Black Men/White Men: A Gay Anthology (1983), and Joseph Beam's In The Life: A Black Gay Anthology (1986). His use of coding made much of his work pass unseen by straight contemporaries, under the disguise of biblical imagery, for example. Nugent bridged the gap between the Harlem Renaissance and the black gay movement of the 1980s, and was an inspiration to many of his contemporaries.

The contemporary artist Isaac Julien has included Nugent's work in his ongoing multi-media video-art series commemorating and speculatively re-imagining the lives of prominent black male figures in the twentieth century. Most prominently, Julien used excerpts from Nugent's "Smoke, Lilies, and Jade" in his 1989 piece ’’Looking for Langston’’, a filmic meditation on the queerness of the Harlem Renaissance poet Langston Hughes.

== Works ==
- "Shadow"
- "My Love"
- "Narcissus"
- "Incest"
- "Who Asks This Thing?"
- "Bastard Song"
- "Sahdji"
- "Smoke, Lilies and Jade"
- "The Now Discordant Song of Bells"
- "Slender Length of Beauty"
- "Tunic with a Thousand Pleats"
- "Pooty Tang"
- "Pope Pius the Only"
- "On Harlem"
- "On Georgette Harvey"
- "On Gloria Swanson"
- "Lunatique"
- "Pattern for Future Dirges"
- Paupaulekejo (with Georgia Douglas Johnson)
- Tax Fare (with Rose McClendon)

=== Novels ===
- Gentleman Jigger (2008)
- Half High (2023)

== In popular culture ==
=== Film ===
As one of the last survivors of the Harlem Renaissance, Nugent was consulted by numerous biographers and writers on both Black and gay history. He was interviewed in the 1984 documentary Before Stonewall, and his work was featured in Isaac Julien's 1989 film Looking for Langston.

In Rodney Evans' 2004 Brother to Brother, an art student befriends an elderly homeless man who is a fictionalized version of Bruce Nugent played by Roger Robinson.

=== Theater ===
Smoke, Lilies, and Jade is a bildungsroman play by Carl Hancock Rux, loosely based on Nugent's 1926 short story of the same name as well as elements of Nugent's own life. The play concerns the psychological and moral growth of its protagonist Alex as he reflects on his love for a man named Beauty and a woman named Melva (loosely based on Nugent's wife, Grace Elizabeth Marr) as well as the relationships, racial injustices, and personal tragedies that befell many of his contemporaries. The play was initially commissioned by The Public Theater and was later produced by the CalArts Center for New Performance.

== Sources ==
- Carter, Linda M (2004). "African American Dramatists: An A-to-Z Guide". In Nelson, Emmanuel S. (ed.). African American dramatists: an A to Z guide. Westport, Connecticut: Greenwood Press. ISBN 9780313322334.
- Gerstner, David A. (2011). Queer Pollen: White Seduction, Black Male Homosexuality, and the Cinematic. The New Black Studies Series. University of Illinois Press. ISBN 978-0-252-03590-6.
