= Wallace Thurman =

American novelist and screenwriter (1902–1934)

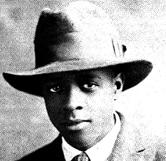
- Thurman in 1928
- Born: August 16, 1902; Salt Lake City, Utah, U.S.
- Died: December 22, 1934 (aged 32); New York City, New York, U.S.
- Occupations: Novelist; dramatist; columnist; essayist; editor; publisher; intellectual

Wallace Henry Thurman (August 16, 1902 – December 22, 1934) was an American novelist and screenwriter active during the Harlem Renaissance. He also wrote essays, worked as an editor, and was a publisher of short-lived newspapers and literary journals. He is best known for his first novel The Blacker the Berry: A Novel of Negro Life (1929), which explores discrimination based on skin tone within the black community, with lighter skin being more highly valued.

== Early life ==
Thurman was born in Salt Lake City to Beulah and Oscar Thurman. When Thurman was less than a month old, his father abandoned his wife and son. It was not until Wallace was 30 years old that he met his father. Between his mother's many marriages, Wallace and his mother lived in Salt Lake City with Emma Jackson, also known as Ma Jack, his maternal grandmother. Jackson ran a saloon from her home, selling alcohol without a license.

Thurman's early life was marked by loneliness, family instability, and illness. He began grade school at age six in Boise, Idaho, but his poor health eventually led to a two-year absence from school. During this time, he returned to live with his grandmother Emma in Salt Lake City. From 1910 to 1914, Thurman lived in Chicago. Continuing to move with his mother, he finished grammar school in Omaha, Nebraska. During this time, he suffered from repeated heart attacks. While living in Pasadena, California in the winter of 1918, Thurman caught influenza during the worldwide Influenza Pandemic. He recovered and returned to Salt Lake City, where he finished high school.

Thurman was a voracious reader. He enjoyed the works of Plato, Aristotle, Shakespeare, Havelock Ellis, Flaubert, Charles Baudelaire and many others. He wrote his first novel at the age of 10. He attended the University of Utah from 1919 to 1920 as a pre-medical student. In 1922, he transferred to the University of Southern California in Los Angeles and took a few journalism courses, but left without earning a degree. He was also a postal clerk for three years.

While in Los Angeles, he met and befriended writer Arna Bontemps, and became a reporter and wrote a column, "Inklings", for a short-lived black-owned newspaper, The Pacific Defender. He started a magazine, Outlet, intended to be a West Coast equivalent to The Crisis, operated by the NAACP.

== Career ==
In 1925, Thurman moved to Harlem, New York City. When he first arrived in New York, he was roommates with Langston Hughes at 314 West 138th Street, an address frequently mentioned in letter correspondence. During the next decade, he worked as a ghostwriter, a publisher, and editor and wrote novels, plays, and articles. Shortly after his arrival in New York, he worked at The Looking Glass for Theophilus Lewis without pay. Late in 1925, Lewis recommended A. Philip Randolph to hire Thurman as the editor of The Messenger, a socialist journal addressed to black people. There he was the first to publish the adult-themed stories of Langston Hughes.

Thurman left the journal in November 1926 to become an editor for World Tomorrow, which was owned by whites. The following month, he collaborated in founding the literary magazine Fire!! Devoted to the Younger Negro Artists. Among its contributors were Langston Hughes, Zora Neale Hurston, Richard Bruce Nugent, Aaron Douglas, and Gwendolyn B. Bennett.

Thurman published only one issue of Fire!!. It challenged such established figures as W. E. B. Du Bois and other African Americans who had been working for social equality and racial integration. Thurman criticized them for believing that black art should serve as propaganda for those ends. He said that the New Negro movement spent too much energy trying to show white Americans that Black Americans were respectable and not inferior. In general, Thurman challenged the ideas of the black bourgeoisie and used Fire!! as a medium to give other younger artists a voice against them. However, Thurman spent the rest of his life repaying debts from the failure of Fire!!, frequently complaining to and borrowing money from Hughes via their letter correspondences.

Thurman and others of the "Niggerati" (the deliberately ironic name he used for the young African-American artists and intellectuals of the Harlem Renaissance) wanted to show the real lives of African Americans, both the good and the bad. Thurman believed that black artists should fully acknowledge and celebrate the arduous conditions of African-American lives. As Singh and Scott wrote,

Thurman's Harlem Renaissance is, thus, staunch and revolutionary in its commitment to individuality and critical objectivity: the black writer need not pander to the aesthetic preferences of the black middle class, nor should he or she write for an easy and patronizing white approval.

During this time, Thurman's flat in a rooming house, at 267 West 136th Street in Harlem, where he lived with fellow writer Richard Bruce Nugent, became the central meeting place of African-American literary avant-garde and visual artists. Thurman and Hurston mockingly called the room "Niggerati Manor". He had painted the walls red and black, which were the colors he used on the cover of Fire!! Bruce Nugent painted murals on the walls, some of which contained homoerotic content.

In 1928, Thurman was asked to edit a magazine called Harlem: A Forum of Negro Life; its contributors included Alain Locke, George Schuyler, and Alice Dunbar-Nelson. He put out two issues. Afterwards, Thurman joined the editorial staff for MacFadden Publishers.

Langston Hughes described Thurman as "a strangely brilliant black boy, who had read everything and whose critical mind could find something wrong with everything he read." Thurman's dark skin color attracted comment, including negative reactions from both black and white Americans. He addressed such colorism in his writings, attacking the black community's preference for its lighter-skinned members.

Thurman wrote a play, Harlem: A Melodrama of Negro Life in Harlem, which debuted on Broadway in 1929 to mixed reviews. His theatrical agent was Frieda Fishbein. The same year his first novel The Blacker the Berry: A Novel of Negro Life (1929) was published. The novel is now recognized as a groundbreaking work of fiction because of its focus on intra-racial prejudice and colorism within the black community, where lighter skin was favored.

Three years later, Thurman published Infants of the Spring (1932), a satire of the themes and individuals of the Harlem Renaissance.

Thurman also co-authored his final novel with another white collaborator Abraham L. Furman in 1932, The Interne, a fictional exposé of the conditions in the City Hospital on Welfare Island. In 1934, Thurman ironically finds himself within the same hospital where he would live out his final days, and continued to write against the advice of the doctors. From this hospitalization also came "Description of a Male Tuberculosis Ward," an unpublished work that would give a voice to the people inside the ward, using the alias "Male X," to refer to another patient within the facility. Within the work, he says "The patients were worthy of a novel," which goes along with Thurman's desire to consistently analyze the social inequity of voices and perspectives that were not often prioritized.

Thurman worked in the late 1920s as a screenwriter for Fox, MGM, and Pathe studios. His film credits as a screenwriter include Tomorrow's Children and High School Girl, both released in 1934.

In 2003, Rutgers University Press issued The Collected Writings of Wallace Thurman: A Harlem Renaissance Reader. It includes three previously unpublished works: "Aunt Hagar's Children, which is a collection of essays[,] and two full-length plays, Harlem, and Jeremiah the Magnificent".

== Personal life ==
Shortly after he moved to New York, Thurman was arrested for having sex with a man. He publicly denied being gay and feared that others would discover that he was.

Thurman married Louise Thompson on August 22, 1928, but the marriage lasted only six months. Thompson said that Wallace was a homosexual and refused to admit it, although he rejected the charge. They had no children together. According to a letter Thurman wrote to William Jourdan Rapp, Thompson found out about a 1925 incident when Thurman was arrested after a man propositioned him in a bathroom and told her lawyer, who threatened to charge him with being a homosexual in divorce proceedings. After their divorce, Thurman was required to pay Thompson alimony, and in a letter to Rapp he said was recommended to pay "$50 per week for a year—totaling about $2,500", which he started before the divorce was finalized due to Thompson's claim of being broke.

== Death ==
Thurman died at the age of 32 from tuberculosis, which many suspect was exacerbated by his long fight with alcoholism. He spent the last months of his life in the same hospital he wrote about in his 1932 novel, The Interne. He reflects on his health in a letter to Hughes alongside an autobiographical piece "Description of a Male Tuberculosis Ward,” which was written around July 1934.

Whowouldathought I would soon end up in the tubercular ward of the very hospital I damned and god-damned when I wrote The Interne. Ironic, I calls it. Or is nature finally avenging art? The hospital is still terrible. Certain conditions have changed for the better—there is more help and less dirt. But the patients are the worst feature

— Wallace Thurman, A letter to Hughes, September 1934, Singh, Scott (2003), p. 103

== See also ==
- Harlem Renaissance
- African American literature
