= Fire!! =

1926 African-American literary magazine in New York City

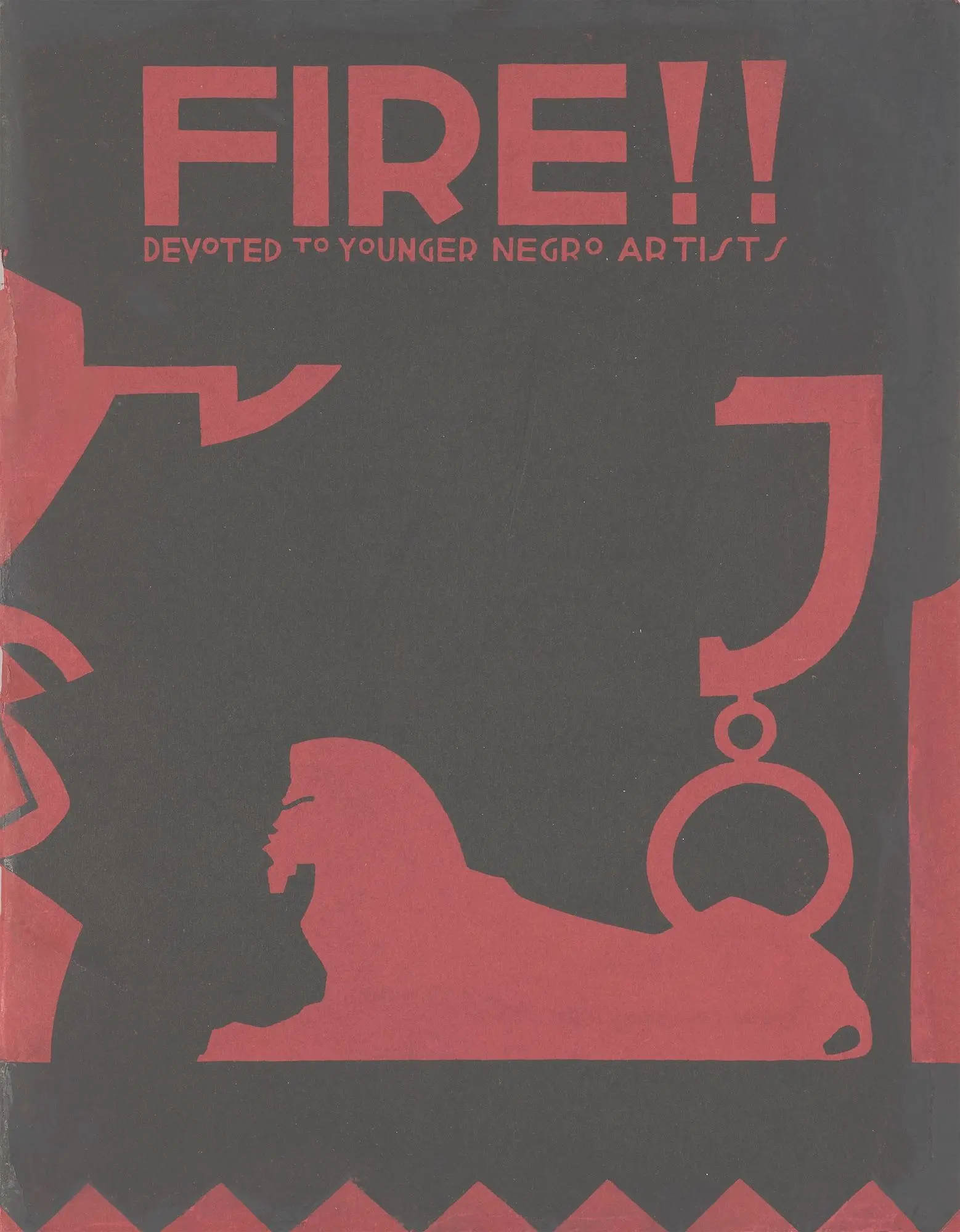
The cover of the first and only issue

Fire!! A Quarterly Devoted to the Younger Negro Artists was an African American literary magazine published in New York City in 1926 during the Harlem Renaissance. The publication was started by Wallace Thurman, Zora Neale Hurston, Aaron Douglas, John P. Davis, Richard Bruce Nugent, Gwendolyn Bennett, Lewis Grandison Alexander, Countee Cullen, and Langston Hughes. The magazine's title referred to burning up old ideas, and Fire!! challenged the norms of the older Black generation while featuring younger authors. The publishers promoted a realistic style, using vernacular language and covering controversial topics such as homosexuality and prostitution. Many readers were offended, and some Black leaders denounced the magazine. The endeavor was plagued by debt, and its quarters burned down, ending the magazine after just one issue.

== History ==
Fire!! was conceived by the self-described Niggerati literary group, to express the African-American experience during the Harlem Renaissance in a modern and realistic fashion, using literature as a vehicle of enlightenment. The magazine's founders wanted to express the changing attitudes of younger African Americans. In Fire!! they explored controversial issues in the Black community, such as homosexuality, bisexuality, interracial relationships, promiscuity, prostitution, and color prejudice.

Langston Hughes wrote that the name was intended to symbolize their goal "to burn up a lot of the old, dead conventional Negro-white ideas of the past ... into a realization of the existence of the younger Negro writers and artists, and provide us with an outlet for publication not available in the limited pages of the small Negro magazines then existing." The magazine's headquarters burned to the ground shortly after it published its first issue, ending its operations.

== Reception ==
Fire!! was plagued by debt and encountered poor sales. It was not well received by the Black public because some felt that the journal did not represent the sophisticated self-image of Blacks in Harlem. Other readers found it offensive for many reasons, and it was denounced by Black leaders such as the Talented Tenth, "who viewed the effort as decadent and vulgar". They disapproved of content relating to prostitution and homosexuality, which they considered degrading to "the race." They also thought many pieces published were a throw-back to old stereotypes, as they were written in the slang and language of the southern vernacular. They felt the "undignified" contents reflected poorly on the Black race. As an example, the critic at the Baltimore Afro-American wrote that he "just tossed the first issue of Fire!! into the fire".

Thurman solicited art, poetry, fiction, drama, and essays from his editorial advisers, as well as from such leading figures of the New Negro movement as Countee Cullen and Arna Bontemps. Responses to the magazine ranged from minimal notice in the white press to heated contention among African American critics. Among the latter, the senior rank of intellectuals, such as W.E.B. Du Bois, tended to dismiss it as self-indulgent, while younger figures reacted enthusiastically.

But, The Bookman applauded the journal's unique qualities and its personality. Although this magazine had only one issue, "this single issue of Fire!! is considered an event of historical importance."

== Features ==
The magazine covered a variety of literary genres: it included a novella, an essay, stories, plays, drawings and illustrations, and poetry.

Table of Contents	Author or artist
Cover Designs	Aaron Douglas
Foreword	
Drawing	Richard Bruce
Cordelia The Crude, A Harlem Sketch	Wallace Thurman
Color Struck, A Play in Four Scenes	Zora Neale Hurston
Flame From The Dark Tower, A Section of Poetry	Countee Cullen, Helene Johnson, Edward Silvera, Waring Cuney, Langston Hughes, Arna Bontemps, Lewis Alexander
Drawing	Richard Bruce
Wedding Day, A Story	Gwendolyn Bennett
Three Drawings	Aaron Douglas
Smoke, Lilies And Jade, A Novel, Part I	Richard Bruce
Sweat, A Story	Zora Neale Hurston
Intelligentsia, An Essay	Arthur Huff Fauset
Fire Burns, Editorial Comment	Wallace Thurman
Incidental Art Decorations	Aaron Douglas

== Representation in other media ==
The story of the rise and fall of Fire!! is showcased in the 2004 movie Brother to Brother. It features a gay African-American college student named Perry Williams. He befriends an elderly gay African American named Bruce Nugent. Williams learns that Nugent was a writer and co-founder of Fire!!, and associated with other notable writers and artists of the Harlem Renaissance.

"Fire!!" is heavily mentioned in the play Smoke, Lilies, and Jade by Carl Hancock Rux, first developed at the Joseph Papp Public Theater under the direction of George C. Wolfe and later produced at the California Institute of the Arts Center for New Performance, as well as in the play FIRE! written by Jenifer Nii. The play premiered in 2010 at Salt Lake City, Utah's Plan B Theatre Company. The 45-minute play covers Wallace Thurman's life, with a focus on the production of "Fire!!" and the writing he did following it.

In October 2025, the Sedgwick Theater in Mount Airy, Philadelphia premiered Fire!!: Devoted to Younger Negro Artists. Playwrights Marilyn Campbell-Lowe and Paul Oakley Stovall set up a fictional premise centering on writer/editor Wallace Thurman, who is in debt to the publishing house and organizes the other writers and artists of the first issue of Fire!! to perform stories from the publication to attract prospective benefactors.
