= Untitled (The Birth) =

1938 painting by Jacob Lawrence

- Artist: Jacob Lawrence
- Year: 1938
- Medium: Tempera on paper
- Dimensions: 32.70 cm × 29.53 cm (12.875 in × 11.625 in)
- Location: Indianapolis Museum of Art; Indianapolis

Untitled (The Birth) is a 1938 tempera painting by American artist Jacob Lawrence, located in the Indianapolis Museum of Art, which is in Indianapolis, Indiana. Depicting a scene of childbirth in flat, geometric forms and bright colors, it is very much a product of the Harlem Renaissance.

== Description ==
This painting shows a woman giving birth in a Harlem tenement during the Great Depression. Two men are poised to assist her, while a third departs. It is a deeply intimate portrayal of poverty, but one devoid of sentimentality, as befits Lawrence's role as an artist of Social realism. As one of the few painters of his day who grew up in a black community and was trained by black artists, Lawrence had a special affinity for scenes of everyday African American life such as this.

== Historical information ==
1938 was a pivotal year for Lawrence. He completed his much-lauded series of 41 paintings on the life of Toussaint L’Ouverture and began a similar series on Frederick Douglass. Having turned 21, he finally managed to secure employment with the Works Progress Administration, which required him to produce paintings at the rate of one every three weeks. Throughout this, he continued to capture the scenes of Harlem in works such as this one, while putting on multiple exhibitions in the area, including a solo effort at the Harlem YMCA.

=== Acquisition ===
This painting was acquired by the IMA in 1997 from Terry Dintenfass Inc., courtesy of the National Coalition of 100 Black Women, Indianapolis Chapter; the Alliance of the Indianapolis Museum of Art; and the Mr. and Mrs. Richard Crane Fund. It is currently on display in the American Art gallery and has the accession number 1997.130.

== See also ==
- Home birth
