= Sweat (short story) =

1926 short story by Zora Neale Hurston

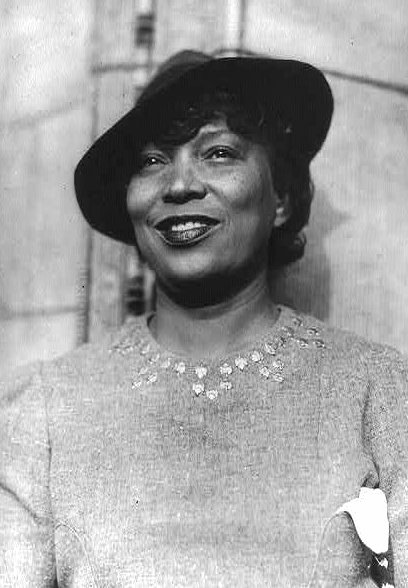
Zora Neale Hurston, the author of "Sweat"

"Sweat" is a short story by the American writer Zora Neale Hurston, first published in 1926, in the first and only issue of the African-American literary magazine Fire!! The story revolves around a washerwoman and her unemployed husband.

== Summary ==
Delia is a washerwoman who works long hours in a small Central Florida town. Her husband Sykes does not work, yet he uses all of her money and resents that Delia cleans "white folks'" clothes in their home, and scares her by using her fear of snakes. The marriage is abusive; Sykes began beating Delia two months after marrying. Observers in the town remark how the once-beautiful Delia has lost her shine because of the abuse. Delia has come to the conclusion that she does not need Sykes or his abuse, particularly considering it is her wages that paid for their home.

Tired of Delia and seeking out freedom with his "portly" mistress Bertha, Sykes hatches a plan to poison Delia by planting a rattlesnake in her washing clothes. However, it is Sykes who is poisoned by the rattlesnake, fatally, in the neck. In response, Delia sits meditatively below a chinaberry tree waiting for her husband to expire, and ignoring his pleas for aid.

== Characters ==
- Delia: Delia is an abused wife and her jaded view of Sykes and his mistreatment of her grows as the story progresses. Delia comes to feel the same way about her marriage as Sykes does: that the relationship has run its course. Delia portrays a woman from the Deep South in the first half of the 20th century who comes to discover freedom as independence from men.
- Sykes: Sykes is a stereotypical abusive husband. He physically and mentally abuses Delia, takes her income while failing to make his own, and has an affair on the side. Despite being out of work, for three months he has paid his mistress Bertha's rent. After he has "wrung every drop of pleasure" out of Delia, he plots to poison her with a rattlesnake, but the plan backfires after he is fatally bitten in the neck.

== Themes ==
=== Domestic abuse ===
Sykes abuses Delia physically by beating her, economically by taking her income, and emotionally by putting her down for her body type. The story investigates the psychological effects of an abusive relationship.

During the post-civil war time period, black men in the rural south had few job opportunities while black women could find work in the domestic service industry. As seen in the story, Delia is the sole financial provider for the family and this makes Sykes' masculinity feel threatened. Sykes understands that he needs his wife's money, so he resorts to physically harming Delia in order to help him feel powerful in a restrictive environment for black males.

=== Empowerment and Survival ===
==== The working life versus the trifling life ====
The story's title "Sweat" refers to all the physical labor that Delia performs, which contrasts with Sykes' life of leisure and entitlement. The story does not refer to any job or income for Sykes, but he does somehow pay his mistress Bertha's rent, and he and his mistress even go on "stomps"—probably dates at a nightclub.

==== Feminism ====
The historical background presented during the time period when "Sweat" was published, represents a time when feminist art movements were taking place. "Sweat" was published in 1926 in a magazine named, "Fire!!". During the time it was published many African American artists were celebrating black culture and diversity in Harlem, NY. Zora Neale Hurston, an African American artist, wrote for black women, exposing their struggles with not only racism but sexism as well. Hurston was able to write feminist pieces that included novels, short stories, journals, and letters. This was more accessible and approachable for women.

Hurston describes that women were denied equal opportunities and abused by men in "Sweat". The story portrays Delia as being as strong and as independent as a woman can be in her circumstance. She works with each and every day. Much of Delia's sexuality and emotions are dominated by her husband Sykes though, as he abuses his power of being the dominant sex over Delia. He is a womanizer and abusive. Delia feels as though she cannot leave him though out of fear for her safety and out of guilt. Because of this, her husband has much of the control over Delia, male over female, compared to master over slave.

== Setting ==
The setting is in a small town in Central Florida near Orlando (this setting is common throughout much of Hurston's work). The events take place during a particularly hot July and August. Snakes, like the diamondback rattlesnake in the story, are prevalent in the area.
