= Aaron Douglas (artist) =

American painter (1899–1979)

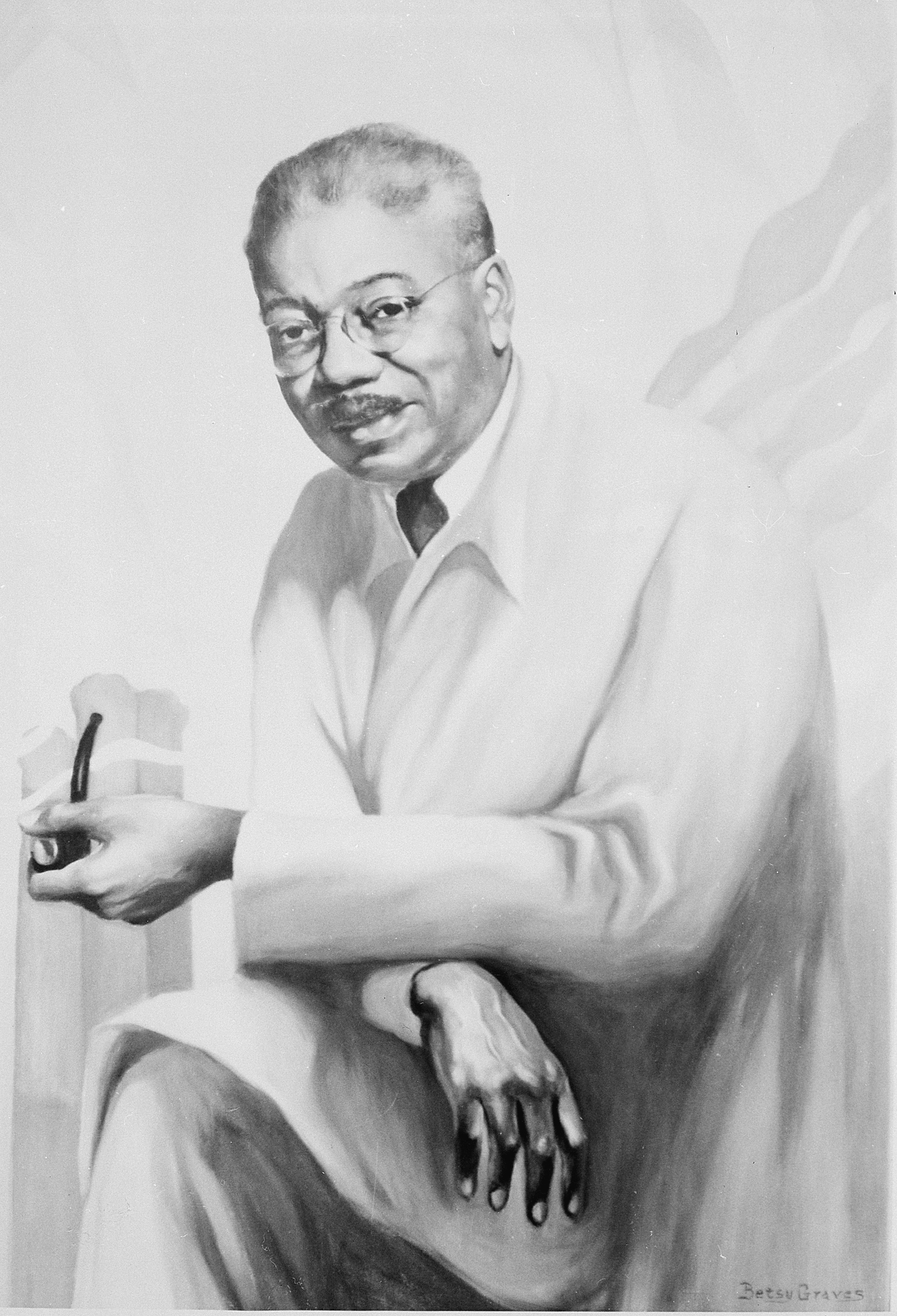
- Portrait by Betsy Graves Reyneau
- Born: May 26, 1899; Topeka, Kansas, United States
- Died: February 2, 1979 (aged 79); Nashville, Tennessee, United States
- Known for: Painting, Illustration, Murals
- Style: Jazz Age, Modernism, Art Deco
- Movement: Harlem Renaissance

Aaron Douglas (May 26, 1899 – February 2, 1979) was an American painter, illustrator, and visual arts educator. He was a major figure in the Harlem Renaissance. He developed his art career painting murals and creating illustrations that addressed social issues around race and segregation in the United States by utilizing African-centric imagery. Douglas set the stage for young, African-American artists to enter the public-arts realm through his involvement with the Harlem Artists Guild. In 1944, he concluded his art career by founding the Art Department at Fisk University in Nashville, Tennessee. He taught visual art classes at Fisk University until his retirement in 1966. Douglas is known as a prominent leader in modern African-American art whose work influenced artists for years to come.

== Early life ==
Aaron Douglas was born and raised in Topeka, Kansas, on May 26, 1899, to Aaron Douglas Sr, a baker from Tennessee, and Elizabeth Douglas, a homemaker and amateur artist from Alabama. His passion for art derived from admiring his mother's drawings. He attended Topeka High School, during which he worked for Skinner's Nursery and Union Pacific material yard, and graduated in 1917.

After high school, Douglas moved to Detroit, Michigan, and held various jobs, including working as a plasterer and molding sand for automobile radiators at the Cadillac factory. During this time, he attended free classes at the Detroit Museum of Art. Douglas travelled further eastward, through East St. Louis to Dunkirk in upstate New York, working at the Essex Glass factory to earn money for college. He went on to attend college at the University of Nebraska in 1918. While there, Douglas worked as a busboy to finance his education. When the United States entered World War I, Douglas attempted to join the Student Army Training Corps (SATC) at the University of Nebraska, but was dismissed. Historians have speculated that this dismissal was related to the racially segregated climate of American society and the military. He then transferred for a short time to the University of Minnesota, where he volunteered for the SATC and attained the rank of corporal. After the signing of the armistice, he returned to the University of Nebraska, where he received a Bachelor of Fine Arts degree in 1922.

After graduating, Douglas worked as a waiter for the Union Pacific Railroad until 1923, when he secured a job teaching visual arts at Lincoln High School in Kansas City, Missouri, staying there until 1925. During his time in Kansas City, he exchanged letters with Alta Sawyer, his future wife, about his plans beyond teaching in a high-school setting. He wanted to take his art career to Paris, France, as many of his aspiring artist peers did.

== Career ==
=== 1925–27 ===
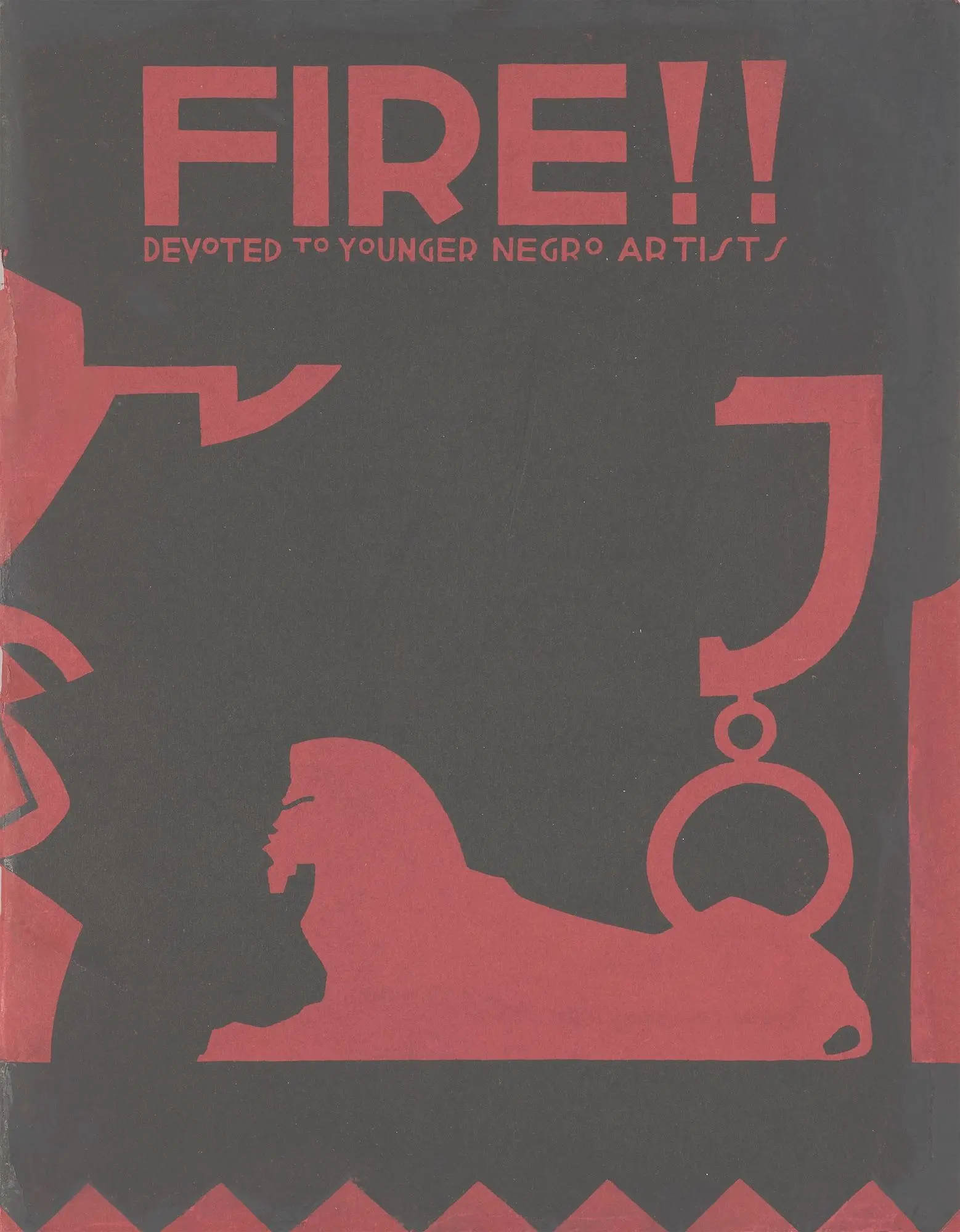
The cover of the first and only issue of the magazine Fire!! (1926) was designed by Aaron Douglas.

In 1925, Douglas intended to pass through Harlem, New York, on his way to Paris to advance his art career. He was convinced to stay in Harlem and develop his art during the height of the Harlem Renaissance, influenced by the writings of Alain Locke about the importance of Harlem for aspiring African Americans. While in Harlem, Douglas studied under Winold Reiss, a German portraitist who encouraged him to work with African-centric themes to create a sense of unity between African Americans with art; Douglas was included in Alain Locke's 1925 anthology The New Negro as Reiss's pupil.

Douglas worked with W. E. B. Du Bois, then-editor at The Crisis, a monthly journal of the NAACP, and became art editor himself briefly in 1927. Douglas also illustrated for Charles S. Johnson, then-editor at Opportunity, the official publication of the National Urban League. These illustrations focused on articles about lynching and segregation, and theater and jazz. His illustrations also featured in the periodicals Vanity Fair and Theatre Arts Monthly and made the cover of the only issue of the African-American avantgarde magazine Fire!!. In 1927, Douglas was asked to create the first of his murals at Club Ebony, which highlighted Harlem nightlife.

=== 1928–31 ===
In 1928, Douglas received a one-year Barnes Foundation Fellowship in Philadelphia, Pennsylvania, where Albert C. Barnes, philanthropist and founder of the Barnes Foundation, supported him in studying the collection of Modernist paintings and African art. During this same year, Douglas participated in the Harmon Foundation's exhibition organized by the College Art Association, entitled "Contemporary Negro Art." In the summer of 1930, he moved to Nashville, Tennessee, where he worked on a series of murals for Fisk University's Cravath Hall library that he described as a "panorama of the development of Black people in this hemisphere, in the new world." While in Nashville, he was commissioned by the Sherman Hotel in Chicago, Illinois, to paint a mural series. In addition, he was commissioned by Bennett College for Women in Greensboro, North Carolina, to create a mural with Harriet Tubman as its primary figure. He then moved in 1931 for one year to Paris, France, where he received training in sculpture and painting at the Académie Scandinave.

=== 1934–36 ===
Into Bondage (1936) at the National Gallery of Art in Washington, D.C., in 2022.

Douglas returned to Harlem in the mid-1930s to work on his mural painting techniques. Having joined the American Communist Party at some point upon return, he began to explore more political topics within his art as well. In 1934, he was commissioned by New York's 135th Street YMCA to paint a mural on their building, as well as by the Public Works Administration to paint his most acclaimed mural cycle, Aspects of Negro Life, for the Countee Cullen Branch of New York Public Library. He used these murals to inform his audiences of the place of African Americans throughout America's history and its present society. In a series consisting of four murals, Douglas takes his audience from an African setting, to slavery and the Reconstruction era in the United States, then through the threats of lynching and segregation in a post-Civil War America to a final mural depicting the movement of African Americans north towards the Harlem Renaissance and the Great Depression. Douglas created a similar series of murals, which included Into Bondage (1936), for the Texas Centennial Exposition in Dallas in 1936.

During the height of his commissioned work as a muralist, Douglas served as president of the Harlem Artists Guild in 1935, an organization designed to create a network of young artists in New York City to provide support, inspiration, and to help out young artists during the Harlem Renaissance.

=== 1937–66 ===
In 1937, the Rosenwald Foundation awarded Douglas a travel fellowship to go to the American South and visit primarily Black universities, including Fisk University in Nashville, Tennessee, the Tuskegee Institute in Alabama, and Dillard University in New Orleans, Louisiana. In 1938, he again received a travel fellowship from the Rosenwald Foundation to go to the Dominican Republic and Haiti to develop a series of watercolors depicting the life of these Caribbean islands.

Upon returning to the United States in 1940, he worked at Fisk University in Nashville, while attending Columbia University Teacher’s College in New York City. He received his Master of Arts degree in 1944, and moved to Nashville, to found and sit as the chairman of the Art Department at Fisk. During his tenure as a professor in the Art Department, he was the founding director of the Carl Van Vechten Gallery of Fine Arts, which included both White and African-American art in an effort to educate students on being an artist in a segregated American South. Douglas used his experiences as an artist in the Harlem Renaissance to inspire his students to expand on the movements of African-American art. He also encouraged his students to study African-American history to fully understand the necessity for African-American art in predominantly White-American society. Douglas retired from teaching in the Art Department at Fisk University in 1966.

=== 1967–79 ===
Aaron Douglas died in Nashville on February 2, 1979, at the age of 79.

== Legacy ==
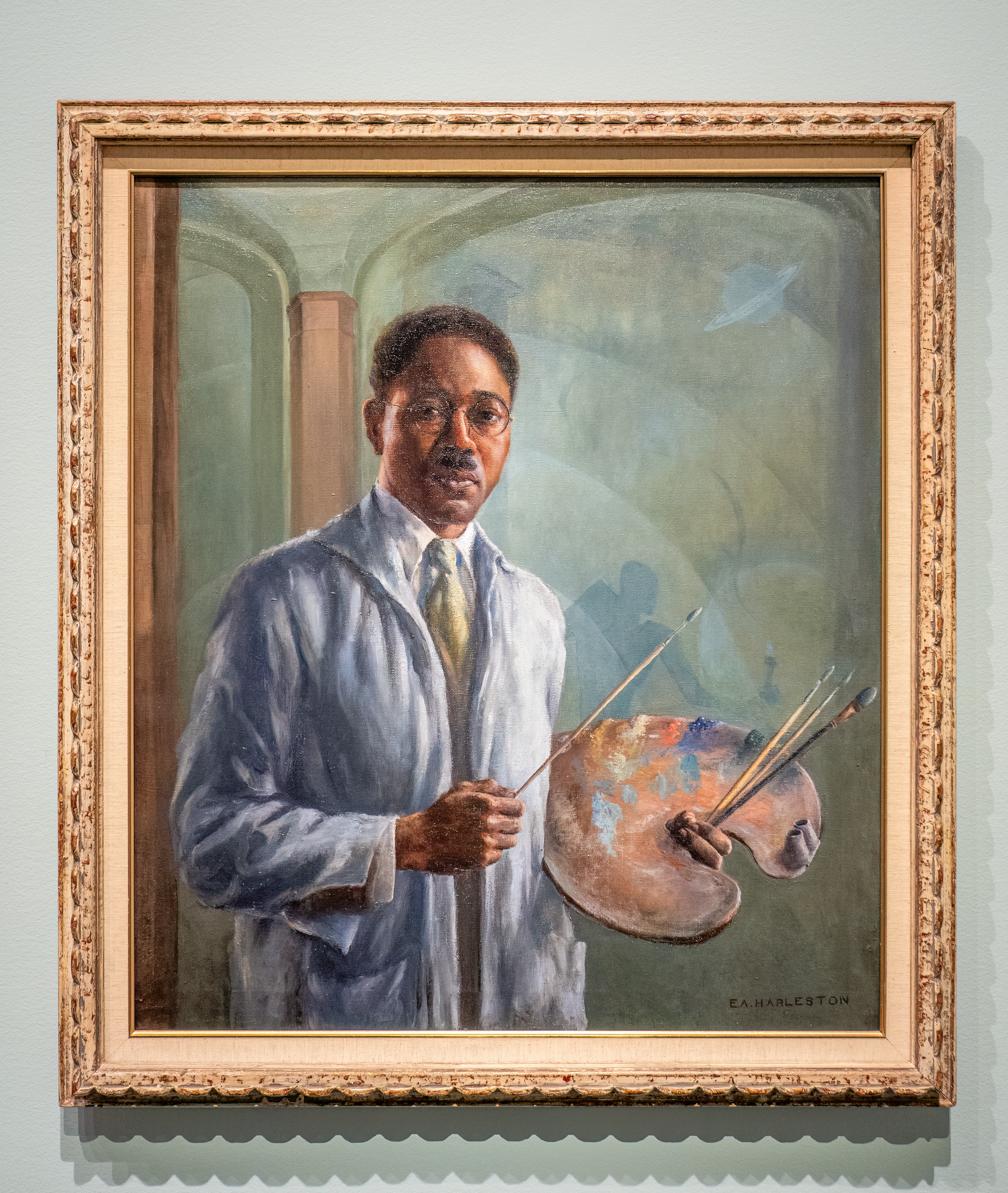
Portrait of Douglas by Edwin Harleston (1930), featured in the Harlem Renaissance and Transatlantic Modernism exhibition at the Metropolitan Museum of Art

Aaron Douglas pioneered the African-American modernist movement by combining aesthetic with ancient African traditional art. He set the stage for future African-American artists to utilize elements of African and African-American history alongside racial themes present in society.

In 2007, the Spencer Museum of Art organized an exhibition titled Aaron Douglas: African-American Modernist. It was held in Lawrence, Kansas, at the Spencer Museum of Art between September 8 to December 2, 2007, and traveled to the Frist Center for the Visual Arts in Nashville, Tennessee, from January 18 to April 13, 2008. It was then on display at the Smithsonian American Art Museum in Washington, D.C,. between May 9 and August 3, 2008. Finally, it traveled to the Schomburg Center for Research in Black Culture in New York, New York, from August 30 to November 30, 2008. An exhaustive catalog of this exhibition was put together through collaboration between Spencer Museum of Art and The University of Kansas, with the title Aaron Douglas: African American Modernist.

Douglas's work was featured in the 2015 exhibition We Speak: Black Artists in Philadelphia, 1920s-1970s at the Woodmere Art Museum.

In 2016, with the opening of the National Museum of African American History and Culture, an archive of artworks created by or having to do with Aaron Douglas became available on their website. Users can access the full references of these pieces of art to determine the creation date, subject of the art, and its current residence.

In October 2026, Bennett College announced that it would sell Harriet Tubman on November 18, 2026, at Sotheby's; the proceeds would be used to support women's health equity initiatives. Harriet Tubman sold for $14.48 million, or more than four times the presale estimate of $2.5 million to $3.5 million; this set a record for works by Douglas whose previous record was $600,000.

== Style ==
Lagos, Nigeria (1956)

Aaron Douglas developed two art styles during his career: first as a traditional portraitist, then as a muralist and illustrator. Influenced by having worked with Winold Reiss, Douglas incorporated African themes into his artwork to create a connection between Africans and African Americans. His work is described as being abstract, in that he portrayed the universality of the African-American people through song, dance, imagery and poetry. Through his murals and illustrations for various publications, he addressed social issues connected with race and segregation in the United States, and was one of the first African-American visual artists to utilize African-centered imagery.

His work features silhouettes of men and women, often in black and white. His human depictions have characteristically flat shapes that are angular and long, with slits for eyes. Often, his female figures are drawn in a crouched position or moving as if they are dancing in a traditional African way. He adopted elements of West African masks and sculptures into his own art, with a technique that utilized cubism to simplify his figures into lines and planes. He employed a narrow range of color, tone and value, most often using greens, browns, mauves, and blacks, with his human forms in darker shades of the present colors of the painting. He created emotional impact with subtle gradations of color, often using concentric circles to influence the viewer to focus on a specific part of the painting.

His artwork is two-dimensional, and his human figures are faceless, allowing their forms to be symbolic and general, so as to create a sense of unity between Africans and African Americans. Douglas’ paintings include semitransparent silhouettes to portray the struggle of African Americans and their relative successes in various aspects of social life. His work is described as unique in creating a link between African Americans and their African ancestry through visual elements that are rooted in African art, and thus give the African-American experience a symbolic aesthetic.

== Notable works ==
- The February 1926 issue of The Crisis
- The May 1926 issue of The Crisis
- Mural at Club Ebony, 1927
- Illustrations for Paul Morand, Black Magic, 1929
- Harriet Tubman, mural (formerly at Bennett College), 1930-1931
- Symbolic Negro History, murals at Fisk University, 1930
- Dance Magic, murals for the Sherman Hotel, Chicago, 1930–31
- Series of illustrations and later paintings initially created for James Weldon Johnson’s God’s Trombones: Seven Negro Sermons in Verse
  - Let My People Go, circa 1935–39
  - The Judgment Day, created in 1939
- Mural series commissioned in 1934 by the Works Progress Administration. The series consists of four murals;
  - The Negro in an African Setting, depicts elements of African cultural dances and music to highlight the central heritage of African Americans.
  - Slavery through Reconstruction, depicts the contrast between the promise of emancipation and political shift in power post-Civil War and the disappointments of Reconstruction in the United States.
  - The Idyll of the Deep South, depicts the perseverance of African-American song and dance against the cruelty of lynching and other threats to African Americans in the United States.
  - Song of the Towers, depicts three events in United States history from an African-American lens, including the movement of African Americans towards the North in the 1910s, the rise of the Harlem Renaissance in the 1920s, and the Great Depression in the 1930s.
- Four-part mural cycle (including Aspiration) at the Texas Centennial Exposition, 1936
- Illustrations included in selected editions of Countee Cullen's Caroling Dusk and Alain Locke's The New Negro.

=== Collections ===
- Let My People Go, Metropolitan Museum of Art, New York City
- The Judgment Day, National Gallery of Art, Washington D.C.
- The Founding of Chicago, Spencer Museum of Art, Lawrence, KS
- Study for "Aspects of Negro Life: From Slavery Through Reconstruction", Baltimore Museum of Art, Baltimore, MD
