= An Anthology of Verse by American Negroes =

1924 poetry anthology

An Anthology of Verse by American Negroes is a 1924 poetry anthology compiled by Newman Ivey White and Walter Clinton Jackson. The anthology is considered one of the major anthologies of black poetry to be published during the Harlem Renaissance, and was republished in 1969. In reviews, the anthology has been positively received for the effort it made to compile poetry, but criticized for ambiguous criticism and poor selection of poems.

== Background ==
The Harlem Renaissance was an intellectual and cultural revival of African American life centered in Harlem, Manhattan, New York City, spanning the 1920s and 1930s. A major aspect of this revival was poetry. Hundreds of poems were written and published by African Americans during the era, which covered a wide variety of themes. The Poetry Foundation wrote that poets in the Harlem Renaissance "explored the beauty and pain of black life and sought to define themselves and their community outside of white stereotypes." Poets such as Langston Hughes, James Weldon Johnson, and Countee Cullen became well known for their poetry, which was often inspired by jazz.

The poetry of the era was published in several different ways, notably in the form of anthologies. The Book of American Negro Poetry (1922), Negro Poets and Their Poems (1923), An Anthology of Verse by American Negroes (1924), and Caroling Dusk (1927) have been cited as four major poetry anthologies of the Harlem Renaissance.

== Publication details ==
The work included an introduction as well as biographical information about the poets whose work was included. James Hardy Dillard wrote the introduction, and the 250 page first edition of the book was published in 1924 by Trinity University Press. It was edited by Newman Ivey White and Walter Clinton Jackson. In 1969 Moore Publishing Company re-released the anthology along with Nine Black Poets, a collection of poems by nine prominent black poets that was edited by R. B. Shuman.

The editors wrote in the preface that they were "Southern white men who desire the most cordial relations between the races" and that they hoped "this volume will help its white readers more clearly to understand the Negro's feelings on certain questions that must be settled by the cooperation of the two races." However, they clarified that the intention of the collection was not to patronize black authors, but to provide an "honest, unbiased appraisal."

== Works included ==
The anthology included 34 poets in total, 6 of which were women, as well as father and son Joseph Seamon (printed as "Seaman") Cotter, and Joseph S. Cotter Jr. respectively. Paul Laurence Dunbar is featured most prominently with 31 poems.

Poet (in order of appearance)	No. of poems
Phillis Wheatley	3
George Moses Horton	2
James Madison Bell	1
Frances Ellen Watkins Harper	2
Charles L. Reason	1
Albery Allson Whitman	2
Paul Laurence Dunbar	31
George Marion McClellan	5
Daniel Webster Davis	4
George Hannibal Temple	1
Charles R. Dinkins	3
Timothy Thomas Fortune	2
J. Mord Allen	5
Clara Ann Thompson	2
William Stanley Beaumont Braithwaite	14
Joseph S. Cotter Sr.	3
Walter Everette Hawkins	3
H. Cordelia Ray	3
Edward Smyth Jones	1
Benjamin Griffith Brawley	4
Fenton Johnson	4
James David Corrothers	4
George Reginald Margetson	4
James Weldon Johnson	5
Joseph S. Cotter Jr.	4
John Wesley Holloway	4
Charles Bertram Johnson	2
Ray G. Dandridge	3
Jessie Redmon Fauset	1
Leslie Pinckney Hill	9
Claude McKay	7
Georgia Douglas Johnson	4
Countee P. Cullen	1
Sarah Collins Fernandis	1

== Reception ==
W. E. B. Du Bois reviewed the anthology in the magazine The Crisis, which he published. Du Bois described An Anthology of Verse by American Negroes as "a thoroughly sincere bit of work for which these men [the editors] should have the thanks of the Negro race." He noted that the editors picked poems which were generally similar to what Johnson (the editor of The Book of American Negro Poetry) and Robert T. Kerlin (editor of Negro Poets and Their Poems) selected, with "perhaps somewhat greater emphasis on many comparatively unknown Negro poets."

A review in The Journal of Negro History described the publication of the anthology by two white men as "an event of no mean significance" yet noted that the authors gave "their own race much credit of the development of this power of the Negro." The reviewer declared that the anthology "marks an epoch in the recognition of Negro achievements in this country" yet felt that "we cannot conclude the literary productions of these poets have thereby been properly evaluated".

A review of the 1969 republication by Andreas Schroeder noted that "a more paranoid trio of editors you could hardly find. Desperately afraid of offending their Negro readers, yet conscious of their role as critical editors [. . .] they fall back repeatedly into an empty, non-committal commentary or a carefully tolerant, bordering on the patronizing, attitude." He considered the collection "a little like an attempt to make black poetry white" by selecting for specific types of poems. Similarly, Schroeder, a Canadian poet, criticized the division of literature into "black" and "white" camps, saying that it is "not differentiated by colors". He felt most of the poetry to not be great and unrepresentative of the quality of Black poetry. The poems, which were "almost all extreme in one way or another" did allow him to "sympathize" with the reasons they were written. In 1989, the scholar Vilma R. Potter agreed, considering White's criticism characterized by ambiguity.
