= The Book of American Negro Poetry =

1922 poetry anthology

The Book of American Negro Poetry is a 1922 poetry anthology that was compiled by James Weldon Johnson. The first edition, published in 1922, was "the first of its kind ever published" and included the works of thirty-one poets. A second edition was released in 1931 with works by nine additional poets.

== Background ==
The Harlem Renaissance was an intellectual and cultural revival of African American life centered in Harlem, Manhattan, New York City, spanning the 1920s and 1930s. A major aspect of this revival was poetry. Hundreds of poems were written and published by African Americans during the era, which covered a wide variety of themes. The Poetry Foundation wrote that poets in the Harlem Renaissance "explored the beauty and pain of black life and sought to define themselves and their community outside of white stereotypes." Poets such as Langston Hughes, James Weldon Johnson, and Countee Cullen became well known for their poetry, which was often inspired by jazz.

The poetry of the era was published in several different ways, notably in the form of anthologies. The Book of American Negro Poetry (1922), Negro Poets and Their Poems (1923), An Anthology of Verse by American Negroes (1924), and Caroling Dusk (1927) have been cited as four major poetry anthologies of the Harlem Renaissance.

== Publishing ==
At the time Johnson edited the anthology, he was executive secretary of the NAACP. The anthology was "the first of its kind ever published", according to the Schomburg Center for Research in Black Culture. The first edition was published by Harcourt, Brace, and Company in 1922 and was 217 pages long. There is a forty-seven page preface written by Johnson and the collection ends with a "biographical index" containing information about the poets whose work is included. A second edition, also published by Harcourt, was released in 1931. The second edition included a new preface and nine additional poets.

== Poets ==
The Book of American Negro Poetry incorporates works by thirty-one poets, with another nine added in 1931:

- Paul Laurence Dunbar
- James Edwin Campbell
- James D. Corrothers
- Daniel Webster Davis
- William H. A. Moore
- W. E. Burghardt Du Bois
- George Marion McClellan
- William Stanley Braithwaite
- George Reginald Margetson
- James Weldon Johnson
- John Wesley Holloway
- Leslie Pinckney Hill
- Edward Smyth Jones
- Ray Garfield Dandridge
- Fenton Johnson
- R. Nathaniel Dett
- Georgia Douglas Johnson
- Claude McKay
- Joseph Seamon Cotter. Jr.
- Roscoe Conkling Jamison
- Jessie Fauset
- Anne Spencer
- Alex Rogers
- Waverley Turner Carmichael
- Alice Dunbar-Nelson
- Charles Bertram Johnson
- Otto Leland Bohanan
- Theodore Henry Shackelford
- Lucian B. Watkins
- Benjamin Brawley
- Joshua Henry Jones, Jr.
- Countee Cullen
- Langston Hughes
- Gwendolyn Bennett
- Sterling Brown
- Arna Bontemps
- Frank Horne
- Helene Johnson
- Waring Cuney
- Lucy Ariel Williams

== Reception ==
The Schomburg Center wrote that the anthology "may be considered his [Johnson's] most important contribution to African American literature." A reviewer of the first publication wrote in The Journal of African American History that the collection was a valuable source of information. A review published in The News & Observer described the anthology as "most illuminating" and "valuable". They wrote that the anthology provided an opportunity to provide deserving recognition to African American poetry.

The second edition received a review in Pacific Affairs. The reviewer particularly praised Johnson's preface, and described the anthology as "a splendid piece of writing, valuable to all those interested in race relations." Another review of this edition, published in The Philadelphia Inquirer, considered it to suffer "from not being sufficiently inclusive", but still felt it to be "a valuable" record "of what poetry the Negro has contributed to American letters".
