= Caroling Dusk =

1927 poetry anthology

Caroling Dusk: An Anthology of Verse by Negro Poets (later retitled Caroling Dusk: An Anthology of Verse by Black Poets of the Twenties) is a 1927 poetry anthology edited by Countee Cullen. It has been republished four times (1955, 1968, 1974 and 1993) and includes works by thirty-eight African-American poets, including Paul Laurence Dunbar, Langston Hughes, Georgia Douglas Johnson, James Weldon Johnson, and Claude McKay. The anthology also includes biographical sketches of the poets whose work is included in the book.

== Background ==
The Harlem Renaissance was an intellectual and cultural revival of African American life centered in Harlem, Manhattan, New York City, spanning the 1920s and 1930s. A major aspect of this revival was poetry. Hundreds of poems were written and published by African Americans during the era, which covered a wide variety of themes. The Poetry Foundation wrote that poets in the Harlem Renaissance "explored the beauty and pain of black life and sought to define themselves and their community outside of white stereotypes." Poets such as Langston Hughes, James Weldon Johnson, and Countee Cullen became well known for their poetry, which was often inspired by jazz.

The poetry of the era was published in several different ways, notably in the form of anthologies. The Book of American Negro Poetry (1922), Negro Poets and Their Poems (1923), An Anthology of Verse by American Negroes (1924), and Caroling Dusk (1927) have been cited as four major poetry anthologies of the Harlem Renaissance.

== Publication details ==
Cullen, who felt that poetry was "instrumental to the cultural development of a race," edited the anthology when he was twenty-four years old. Caroling Dusk was published in 1927 by Harper & Brothers. Upon publication, it included works by thirty-eight African-American poets. It was republished four times in 1955, 1968 and 1974 (by Harper & Row), and in 1993. The anthology also includes biographical sketches of the poets whose work is included in the book. These sketches had generally been written by the poets which they were about.

== Works included ==
Of the thirty-eight poets whose work is in Caroling Dusk, thirteen were women. Lula Lowe Weeden was the youngest poet included in the anthology, at nine years old. She stopped writing poetry as a teenager.

| Poet | No. of poems |
|---|---|
| Paul Laurence Dunbar | 8 |
| Joseph S. Cotter Sr. | 2 |
| James Weldon Johnson | 5 |
| W. E. B. Du Bois | 1 |
| William Stanley Braithwaite | 4 |
| James Edward McCall | 1 |
| Angelina Weld Grimké | 16 |
| Anne Spencer | 10 |
| Mary Effie Lee Newsome | 8 |
| John Frederick Matheus | 1 |
| Fenton Johnson | 3 |
| Jessie Fauset | 7 |
| Alice Dunbar Nelson | 3 |
| Georgia Douglas Johnson | 14 |
| Claude McKay | 8 |
| Jean Toomer | 7 |
| Joseph S. Cotter Jr. | 6 |
| Blanche Taylor Dickinson | 6 |
| Frank Horne | 4 |
| Lewis Alexander | 7 |
| Sterling A. Brown | 7 |
| Clarissa Scott Delany | 4 |
| Langston Hughes | 11 |
| Gwendolyn B. Bennett | 10 |
| Arna Bontemps | 14 |
| Albert Rice | 2 |
| Countee Cullen | 8 |
| Donald Jeffrey Hayes | 6 |
| Jonathan Henderson Brooks | 3 |
| Gladys May Casely Hayford | 4 |
| Lucy Ariel Williams | 1 |
| George Leonard Allen | 2 |
| Richard Bruce | 2 |
| Waring Cuney | 7 |
| Edward S. Silvera | 2 |
| Helene Johnson | 8 |
| Wesley Curtwright | 1 |
| Lula Lowe Weeden | 6 |

== Reception ==
The anthology was described as being "critically acclaimed". A review in the American Journal of Sociology noted that Cullen had tried to "direct attention to some of the younger and less-known Negro writers." A contemporary review that appeared in the Sioux City Journal noted that "Negroes must derive much satisfaction out of the fact these 38 men and women and girls and boys of their race are spinning verses much better than the verses many of their white brethren spin." The reviewer noted that the "never shall forget" some of the poems included.

In 1974 a column in The American Poetry Review that was written by the poet June Jordan covered the anthology. Jordan said she was "extremely delighted to recommend" the collection because of the poets it included. She continued to say that there was "much to cherish" in the anthology, including its compiler (although he almost excessively promoted himself). Jordan criticized some of the poems for lacking substance and not attempting to create a "distinctively Black poem." She concluded by praising the view the anthology presented into the era when it was published. That same year a reviewer in the Kansas City Times described the anthology as "a delight and a joy" and the author, professor Girard T. Bryant, considered that "perhaps no other anthology of poetry by black poets has ever equaled it."

== Bibliography ==
- Cullen, Countee, ed. (1968). Caroling Dusk : An Anthology of Verse by Negro Poets (J. & J. Harper Editions ed.). New York and Evanston: Harper & Row Publishers.
