= Joseph Cotter =

Joseph Cotter may refer to:

- Joseph Henry Cotter (1872–1937), Canadian politician
- Joseph Bernard Cotter (1844–1909), American Roman Catholic bishop
- Joseph Seamon Cotter Jr. (1895–1919), American playwright, author and poet
- Joseph Seamon Cotter Sr. (1861–1949), American poet, writer, playwright, and community leader
- Joe Cotter (1877–1944), British trade union leader
