= Edward Smyth Jones =

Edward Smyth Jones (March 1881 – 28 September 1968) was an African-American poet.

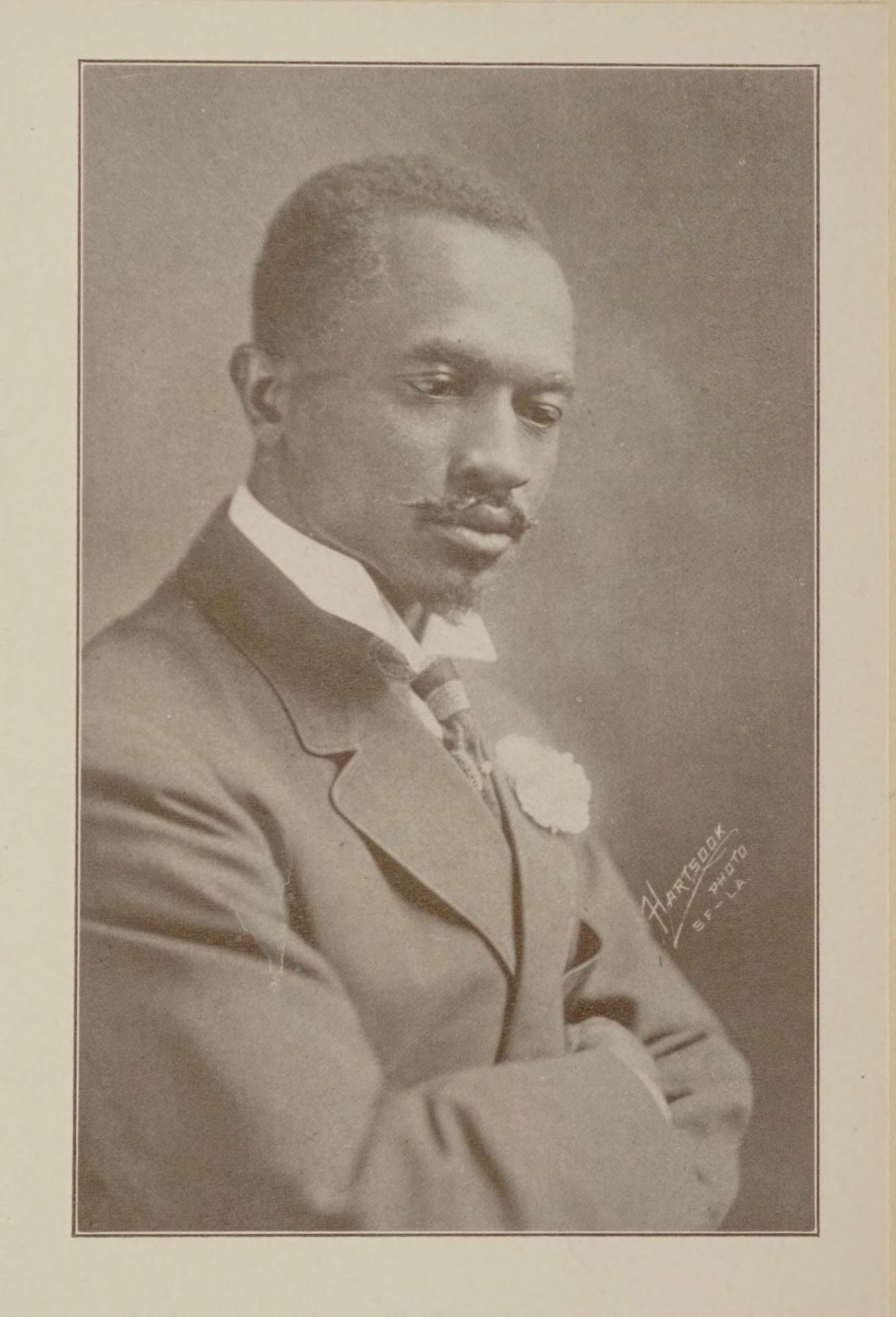
Photo portrait of Edward Smyth Jones

== Life ==
Edward Smyth (sometimes spelled Smythe) Jones was born to former enslaved parents Hawk and Rebecca in Natchez, Mississippi in 1881. He attended Alcorn Agricultural and Mechanical College (now Alcorn State University) for 14 months in 1902–1903, and then later moved to Louisville, Kentucky, where he published his first book of thirty poems, The Rose that Bloometh in My Heart in 1908. Jones had a lifelong desire for education, and particularly wanted to study at Harvard University. Having left Louisville for Indianapolis, Jones set out on foot (and occasionally hopping freight trains) in the summer of 1910 for Cambridge, Massachusetts. "Arriving travel-worn, friendless, moneyless, hungry, he was preparing to bivouac on the Harvard campus his first night in the University city, when, being misunderstood, and not believed, he was apprehended as a vagabond and thrown into jail."

While sitting in "Cell No. 40, East Cambridge Jail, Cambridge, Mass., July 26, 1910" Jones described his journey to Harvard and subsequent arrest in the poem "Harvard Square":

"As soon as locked within the jail,

Deep in a ghastly cell,

Methought I heard the bitter wail

Of all the fiends of hell!"

O God, to Thee I humbly pray

No treacherous prison snare

Shall close my soul within for aye

From dear old Harvard Square.

Just then I saw an holy Sprite

Shed all her radiant beams,

And round her shone the source of light

Of all the poets' dreams!

I plied my pen in sober use,

And spent each moment spare

In sweet communion with the Muse

I met in Harvard Square!"

Jones presented documentation attesting to his character, as well as his poem "Ode to Ethiopia" to arraigning judge Arthur P. Stone, and this, combined with help from the Black lawyer Clement G. Morgan and educator William H. Holtzclaw, was enough to eventually secure his release from jail. Jones went on to secure janitorial work at Harvard, and began attending Boston Latin School, but was unable to finish and enroll in Harvard College due to lack of funds. By 1913 Jones was in New York working as a waiter at the Columbia University Faculty Club, where he was profiled by the New York Times. Little is known about his later life, as by the 1920s he was working as a general laborer in Chicago, where he died in 1968 of a cerebral thrombosis.

Contemporary views of Jones' poetry praised his eloquence and imagery and his luxurious use of language. His poem "A Song of Thanks" was included in the landmark 1922 compilation The Book of American Negro Poetry, edited by James Weldon Johnson. His work was also featured in Negro Poets and Their Poems by Robert T. Kerlin and a Works Progress Administration anthology of African American poetry. Jones was noted for his use of Standard English in his writing, as opposed to vernacular or dialect writing that was common in African American poetry of the time. More recent evaluations of his work liken him to British Romantic poets such as William Wordsworth and explore how his reference to Dante in "Harvard Square" serves as an allegory for the African American experience in the early 20th century.

== Works ==
- The Rose that Bloometh in My Heart (1908, under the pen-name Invincible Ned)
- Our Greater Louisville: Souvenir Poem (1908)
- The Sylvan Cabin. A Centenary Ode on the Birth of Lincoln and Other Verse (1911).
- The Sylvan Cabin; A Centenary Ode on the Birth of Lincoln (1915)
- Flag of the Free (1917)

== In other media ==
- Canadian filmmaker and artist Neely Goniodsky produced a spoken word animated short of Jones' poem "Behind the Bars" in 2018.
