= Frederick German Detweiler =

American sociologist (1881–1960)

Frederick German Detweiler (March 4, 1881–1960) was an American sociologist and expert on race relations, best known for his 1922 book The Negro Press in the United States, published by University of Chicago Press. At the time of his death he was professor emeritus of Sociology at Denison University and a Fellow Emeritus of the American Sociological Association.

== Life and career ==
Detweiler was born in Louisville, Kentucky in 1881 and graduated from high school in Kansas City, Missouri in 1897. In 1908 he earned a degree from Rochester Theological Seminary (now Colgate Rochester Crozer Divinity School) in Rochester, New York, and became a Baptist clergyman. He served parishes in several Ohio cities, and was active in Baptist organizations at the state and national levels.

In 1915 he enrolled as an undergraduate at Denison University in Granville, Ohio and began serving on the faculty while earning a B.A. degree, awarded in 1917. In 1919 Denison awarded him an M.A. degree, and in 1922 Detweiler earned a PhD from the University of Chicago where he studied under Robert E. Park. That same year he published The Negro Press in the United States, the first sociological study of the subject. Detweiler returned to Denison where he taught sociology and later became head of the sociology department and the university's Dean of Men. After retiring from Dennison in 1949, he taught at Wheaton College and several other universities including the University of Colorado.

Detweiler died in Dallas, Texas on March 31, 1960. He had two children: a daughter, Muriel, and a son, Frederick O. Detweiler (1911–1991), who became an executive in the aircraft industry.

== Principal works ==
=== The Negro Press in the United States ===
The Negro Press in the United States was described by Jeffrey Babcock Perry as a major study on the subject, and in 1992 it was still considered an "indispensable reference" on African-American urban migration. Building on Robert T. Kerlin's The Voice of the Negro (1920), Detweiler's book sought to inform the white community about the largely-ignored Negro news media, which in the early 1920s included about 500 printed publications in the United States. At a time when interest in the immigrant press was high, owning largely to recent concerns of native-born Americans about immigrants' wartime loyalties, The Negro Press in the United States dismissed suspicions that black media had sympathized with Germany during World War I. Such suspicions, wrote Detweiler, were "the result of a few sporadic utterances." Detweiler also concluded that there was little evidence of sympathy for bolshevism or socialism in the African-American press at the time. According to Shirley E. Thompson, Detweiler's study was "ultimately a vindication of the protest role of the black press", a role that was "reassuringly American in tone".

=== "The Rise of Modern Race Antagonisms" ===
"The Rise of Modern Race Antagonisms" was published in the American Journal of Sociology in March, 1932 and takes a broadly historic view of race consciousness and conflict. "In the ancient world," Detweiler wrote, "wars and animosities between states do not seem to have been felt as antagonisms of race," though he did acknowledge sharp distinctions had been made between Greeks and barbarians. In the Oxford English Dictionary, the first reference he could find to race, in its contemporary 20th century meaning, was in relation to a natural history book written by Oliver Goldsmith, published in 1774. Detweiler cited the work of 18th century scholars (Linnaeus and Blumenbach) in establishing racial classifications, and the experience of white Americans in racializing Native Americans. He also thought the development of the European slave trade, with origins in the 14th and 15th centuries, had an "effect on the rank and file of English-speaking people {which} was to make all slaves members of a permanently inferior caste. All Africans, also, were thought of as potential slaves."

According to Detweiler, a work on comparative grammar by the German linguist Franz Bopp (A comparative grammar of the Sanskrit, Zend, Greek, Latin, Lithuanian, Gothic, German, and Sclavonic languages), whose first volume was published in 1833, "lent tremendous impetus to the idea of an Aryan race and its superiority." While maintaining a belief that race differences were superficial, Detweiler concluded in 1932 that "in the world in which we live there is now a powerful belief that race is a hidden and decisive force lurking, tigerlike, in the essential makeup of the man above, the man below, or the man outside."
