= Walter Hawkins (disambiguation) =

Walter Hawkins (1949–2010) was an American gospel music singer and pastor.

Walter Hawkins may refer to:

- Walter Hawkins (ship broker) (1787–1862), British ship and insurance broker, antiquarian and numismatist
- Walter Foxcroft Hawkins (1863–1922), American attorney and mayor of Pittsfield, Massachusetts
- Walter Lincoln Hawkins (1911–1992), American chemist
- Walter Everette Hawkins, African American poet
