= Ware High School =

Ware High School may refer to:

- Ware Junior Senior High School, in Ware, Massachusetts
- Ware High School (Augusta, Georgia), a former high school for African Americans
- Ware County High School in Ware County, Georgia
