= The Voice of the Negro =

US magazine

- Cover Page of The Voice of the Negro Volume III, April 1906. Atlanta: Hertel, Jenkins, and Company, 1906
- Editor: John W. E. Bowen, Sr. and Jesse Max Barber
- Frequency: Monthly
- Publisher: J.L. Nichols and Company (Jan. 1904 – Apr. 1904) Hertel, Jenkins, and Company (May 1904 – July 1906) Voice Publishing Company (Aug. 1906 – Oct. 1907)
- First issue: 1904
- Country: United States
- Based in: Atlanta, Georgia (Jan. 1904 – July 1906) Chicago, Illinois (Aug. 1906 – Oct. 1907)
- Language: English

The Voice of the Negro was a literary periodical aimed at a national audience of African Americans. Published from 1904 to 1907, it was created in Atlanta, Georgia in June 1904 by Austin N. Jenkins, the white manager of the publishing company J. L. Nichols and Company. He gave full control of the magazine to the Black editors John W. E. Bowen, Sr. and Jesse Max Barber.

It relocated to Chicago following the Atlanta Race Riot of September 1906, and ceased publication in 1907. The periodical published writing by Booker T. Washington, as well as work by a younger generation of Black activists and intellectuals: W. E. B. Du Bois, John Hope, Kelly Miller, Mary Church Terrell, and William Pickens. It featured poetry by James D. Corrothers, Georgia Douglas Johnson, and Paul Laurence Dunbar.

== History ==
=== Beginnings ===
The Voice of the Negro was the first African-American periodical based in the South. It was originally published in Atlanta in 1904, and created by Austin N. Jenkins, the white manager of the publishing company J. L. Nichols and Company. However, he left complete control and responsibility over the magazine to the Black editors John W. E. Bowen, Sr. and Jesse Max Barber. Barber and Bowen aimed for the magazine to include "current and sociological history so accurately given and so vividly portrayed that it will become a kind of documentation for the coming generations." At this time, Atlanta had the most Black institutes, so the editors also strove to uplift the Black literary and political voice there.

The manifesto for the magazine was published in the January 1904 edition at the start of the issue. Part of the manifesto is as follows:

The Voice of the Negro for 1904 will keep you posted on Current History, Educational Improvements, Art, Science, Race Issues, Sociological Movements and Religion. It is the herald of the Dawn of the Day. It is the first magazine ever edited in the South by Colored Men. It will prove to be a necessity in the cultured colored homes and a source of information on Negro inspirations and aspirations in the white homes.

The editors wanted the magazine to be ideologically and politically independent both to avoid partisan affiliation and to mediate the divide in the Black community between W.E.B. DuBois and Booker T. Washington's differing ideologies. However, Booker T. Washington sought to have influence over the magazine and had his personal secretary Emmett Jay Scott become an associate editor. For the first volume, the editors stayed balanced and published contributions from both DuBois and Washington. Scott eventually left the editorial board in August 1904, however, due to a conflict behind the scenes between Washington and the editors. The editors still wanted to stay neutral for the second volume, but from Spring 1905 and on the magazine became publicly anti-Washington.

=== Political developments ===
Through the articles and editorials, The Voice of the Negro emerged as a vocal political magazine during the early 1900s. The magazine's role as a "political advocate in national and local politics" has content that consists of local and national political figures and how black and white people saw the quality of their work. The "important" people within these discussions were W.E.B. Du Bois, Booker T. Washington, and Theodore Roosevelt. However, the person with the most significant role in presenting the political movements and political commentary was Booker T. Washington. He became the "spokesman and leader" of the Black race with his Atlanta Exposition in 1895.

The Voice of the Negro inspired black intellectuals across the nation and allowed Du Bois to start his political movement, the Niagara movement, in 1905. Which was made of "educated and elite blacks" and promoted political and social equality. The organization also created local organizations in seventeen of thirty states where the magazine was sold. Throughout the journal productions, there was periodical controversy where some of the presented language was not acceptable. Specifically, the words were "Leopard Spots" and "Clansman."

The Voice of the Negro also promoted Theodore Roosevelt's presidency in the early 1901 and 1904, where he spoke and promoted his ideas of "equality," and he was an "advocate of a square deal." After he was elected in 1901, he appointed Booker T. Washington as his advisor of the "Negro population" and appointed William Crum a "black customs collector." Those advances "agitated" many white in the South. Roosevelt later made the South extremely uneasy when he invited Washington to a White House dinner. Though Washington "declared" that the White House dinner was only to the president's benefit, Theodore Roosevelt publicly announced the regret of his initial actions. In 1904, Roosevelt won the presidency, and The Voice of the Negro announced that he won based on the "overwhelming majority of American people believed civic righteousness and fair play to all races."

During Roosevelt's presidency, The Voice of the Negro criticized his role in the change of his racial policy and called his failures to call Congress's attention to open the nullification of the 14th and 15th Amendments. The black community also became outraged with Roosevelt's lack of action in the Brownsville, Texas incident where one citizen was killed and two wounded during a violent riot by white citizens.

The Voice of the Negro became the black population's voice and reflected the anger and outrage of the black population.

=== Social and educational developments ===
The Voice of the Negro's manifesto from the first issue.

Through its articles and editorials, The Voice of the Negro worked to encourage the social and educational development of Black people. The magazine "advocated Black pride, Black self-respect, and encouraged the Black race to seek all of its rights and privileges guaranteed by law." There were many ways in which it worked to advocate these things. For example, the magazine urged the Black population to not emulate the white race to the degree where they lose the appreciation for the beauty and qualities of their own. As well, they stated that since freedom of speech and press were greatly limited in the South, they encouraged people of races to valiantly stand for the rights of everyone and demand their freedoms. The magazine also discussed the attributes a Black man should have: he should think of himself as a worthy man and to demand equal justice and common courtesy from the white man.

The Voice of the Negro encouraged the educational development of Black people, especially in higher institutions of learning. Two universities that were commended by the magazine were Atlanta University and Tuskegee University. In Georgia, Atlanta University was the first higher institution to allow admission to people of all backgrounds and in The Voice of the Negro they were praised for being an institution that had not been "swept from its course by the phantasy of Negro industrial supremacy. It believes in practical education, but it believes that practical education is that kind of education that introduces a man to mankind and helps him to know intimately his own soul." Booker T. Washington was principal of Tuskegee University and the magazine praised his efforts to develop the school despite the mistakes he made a long the way. The Voice of the Negro gave recognition to Washington's success and honored the hard work he put into honoring his race and his nation. Despite the differing ideologies of each institution's leaders, the magazine still praised their success in supporting the educational development of Black people.

=== Decline of the magazine ===
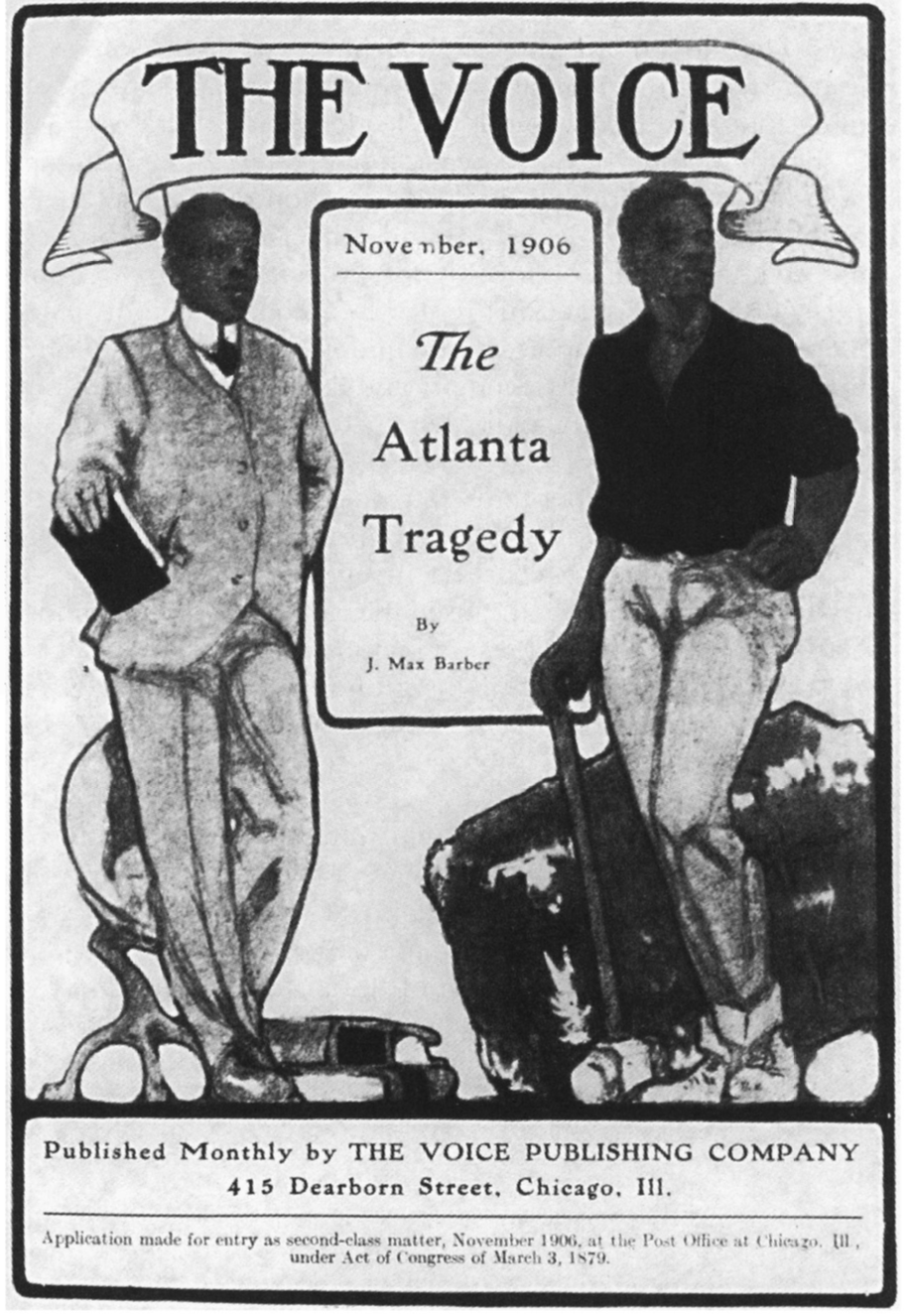
The cover of the magazine for the issue published in November 1906 in Vol. 3, now renamed The Voice.

There was a lot of racial violence occurring in Georgia in the beginning of the 20th century, but the event that impacted the magazine the most was the Atlanta Massacre of 1906. One of the main editors, Jesse Max Barber, was enraged at the speculations that the riot was caused by Atlanta's Black population, so he anonymously wrote in the New York World that the white press was to blame. His authorship was discovered eventually by white leaders and he was threatened with arrest. To avoid arrest, Barber fled to Chicago and continued publication under the shortened name The Voice. However, after relocating, "the subsequent financial instability, coupled with increasing pressure from Tuskegee, compelled Barber to cease production, reluctantly, in October 1907."

== Content ==
=== Volume One ===
The first volume of The Voice of the Negro, was published January 1904. Their goal was to keep the American people updated on the current history, educational improvements, art, science, race issues, sociological movements and religion. The price to subscribe to the issues were $1.00 per year.

Volume one was released in 12 different issues containing events that happened in that particular month. Each of these issues had different editors and contributors which made the content different in every issue.

Volume One No.1 had major contributors like Prof. William Scarborough, Prof. John Hope, Prof. Kelly Miller, Mr. S. A. Beadle and Prof. Silas X. Floyd. All these authors also contributed a short excerpts and poems, an example is S. A. Beadle's short story "If I Had a Million".

Volume One No. 2 had the same contributors as No.1 but introduced newer content from Kelly Miller, Jno. H. Adams Jr, J. Max Barber, W. G. Carver, Benjamin Brawley, H. M. Porter, L. A. J. Moorer, D. Webster Davis, and Silas X. Floyd.

=== Volume Two ===
The second volume of The Voice of the Negro, was published in January 1905. This volume is split up into different numbers going all the way to Number 12. This is released on a monthly basis and is shown next to the title of the Journal.

The credited editors on this Volume Two No. 1 are Benjamin Brawley, Corporal Simmons, Mary Terrell, Bishop Warren Candler, Rev. Dr. Bradley, William Ward, W. E. B. DuBois, Kelly Miller, W.H. Council, Dr. Landrum, James Corrothers, Gardner Goldsby, Alice Ward Smith, and Silas Floyd.

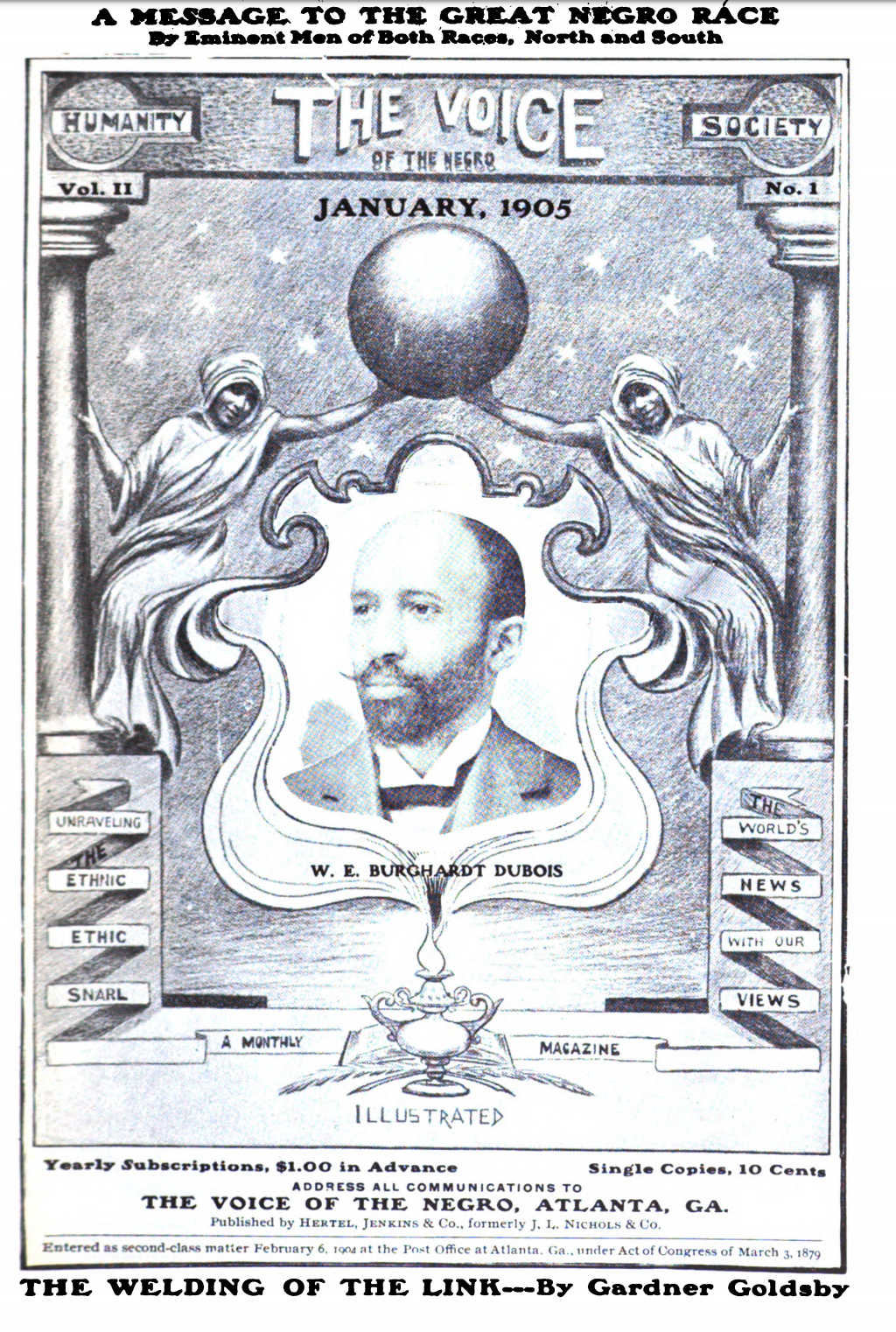
The Voice of the Negro's front page of Volume Two #1. Published January 1905.

The Voice of the Negro first opens with a Monthly Review, which would consist of events that are happening within that year and some insight as to some congressional decisions that had occurred within that year. This journal also includes pieces that are written by the editors discussing a variety of topics. These topics consist of some valuable insight into some of the actions that affect Black people, such as a paper written by Bishop Candler who wrote on the subject of Hostility to lynching. The journal also consists of short stories one of them written by James Corrothers, the title of the short story is "Lincoln".

The credited editors in Vol. Two No. 2 were Gardner Goldsby, Pauline E. Hopkins, Wellington Adams, Mrs. Mary Church Terrell, Daniel Murray, John Henery Adams, and newer material from W.E.B DuBois, Silas X. Floyd, and W. S. Scarborough.

=== Volume Three ===
The third volume of The Voice of the Negro, was published in January 1906. This volume continued the same structure as the previous volumes by releasing twelve different installments corresponding to the year's months.

Vol. 3 No. 1 had contributions from Asa Thombson, William Pickens, T.H. Malone, J.W.E. Bowen, G.A. Lee, W.E.B. DuBois, Mrs. L.K. Wiggins, and Benjamin G. Brawley

Vol. 3 No. 2 had contributions from Alice Ward Smith, Mary White Ovington, J.H. Gray, T.H. Malone, John Henry Adams, Florence Bentley, Daniel Murray, M.A. Majors, Joseph Manning, William Maxwell, John Jenifer, and Silas Floyd

Vol. 3 No. 3 had contributions from Azalia Marlen, Henry Proctor, James Corrothers, Daniel Murray, Will Hendrickson, W.E.B. DuBois, T. THomas Fortune, Lida Wiggins, S.H. Archer, C.C. Poindexter, Anna Comstock, Fanny Williams, and Henery Middleton

=== Volume Four ===
The fourth volume of The Voice of the Negro, was published in January 1907. This volume continued the same structure as the previous volumes by releasing twelve different installments corresponding to the year's months. This was the last volume produced by The Voice of the Negro.

The first issue of vol. Four was a conjoined issue with content from January and February 1907, this issue had contributions from J. Francis Lee, Jasper Phillips, John Daniels, Alexnder Chamberlain, W.S. Scarboroguh, Joseph B. Foraker, Lena Lewis, Russell Fleming, Azalia Martin, John Fraser, Daniel Thompson, John Work, Katherine Tillman, Vere Goldthwaite, William Pickens, Florence Bentley, Fiona Macleod, Jack Thorne, and Silas X. Floyd

The second issue of vol. Four was released in March 1907 and consisted of contributions from Chas Mayberry, A.D. Delaney, Edward E. Wilson, Will H. Hendrickson, Alexander F. Chamberlain, W.E.B DuBois, W.S. Scarborough, J.E. Bruce, Florence Bentley, William Pickens, John Henery Adams, Mary Church Terrell, Florence Lewis Bentley, William Braithwaite, J.A.G. Luvall, Silas X. Floyd and Mrs. Bettie G. Francis
