= Walter Clinton Jackson =

American educator

Walter Clinton Jackson (June 28, 1879 – August 12, 1959) was an American educator. Jackson taught history at the University of North Carolina at Greensboro from 1909 to 1932, and at the University of North Carolina at Chapel Hill from 1932 to 1934. He was head of the Woman's College of the University of North Carolina from 1934 to 1950. Jackson was also a member of several groups, including the Commission on Interracial Cooperation. He published several books and was the editor of An Anthology of Verse by American Negroes (1924) with Newman Ivey White.

After Jackson's death in 1959, the University of North Carolina at Greensboro's library was named after him, and he was inducted into the North Carolina Educational Hall of Fame in 1965.

== Biography ==
Jackson was born on June 28, 1879, to Albert Leroy Jackson, a farmer, and Jane Granade Jackson, a teacher, in Hayston, Georgia. After attending public schools there, he graduated from Mercer University in 1900 with a BS, and was awarded a JD by the same institution in 1926.

Jackson found work as a teacher in Georgia but in 1902 moved to Greensboro, North Carolina, to head the Lindsay Street School there. The following year, he started work at the Greensboro High School, initially teaching English but reaching the post of principal in 1905. Jackson was hired at the University of North Carolina at Greensboro (UNCG) in 1909. There he led the department of history until 1932, also serving as dean from 1915 and vice president from 1921. In 1932 Jackson left to work at the University of North Carolina at Chapel Hill where he headed its school of public administration for two years, at which point he left and became head of the Woman's College of the University of North Carolina. Jackson remained in that role until 1950, when he retired.

He also was involved in and headed several volunteer organizations, including the Commission on Interracial Cooperation (president from 1928 to 1932). Jackson was a trustee of Bennett College and a member of educational groups such as the North Carolina Literary and Historical Association, The North Carolina Historical Review's editorial board, and the Southern Political Science Association (president from 1933 to 1934).

Jackson published several books and edited An Anthology of Verse by American Negroes (1924) with Newman Ivey White. He died in Greensboro on August 12, 1959, after having been sick for several months. UNCG's library was named after him the following year. In 1965 he was inducted into the North Carolina Educational Hall of Fame.

== Personal life ==
Jackson married Mattie Redford in 1902; they had three children.
