= John F. Matheus =

American writer and scholar (1887–1983)

- Born: September 10, 1887; Keyser, West Virginia, US
- Died: February 19, 1983 (aged 95); Florida
- Education: Case Western Reserve (1910, BA), Columbia University (1921, MA)
- Occupations: Writer, scholar
- Notable work: "Fog", "Swamp Moccasin", Ouanga!
- Parent(s): John William, Mary Susan Brown Matheus

John Frederick Matheus (September 10, 1887 – February 19, 1983) was an American writer and a scholar who was active during the Harlem Renaissance in the 1920s. He is well known for his short stories, and he also wrote essays, plays and poetry. His story "Fog" won first place in Opportunity magazine's literary contest in 1925 and was published that same year in Alain Locke's famous anthology The New Negro. Matheus won first prize in the Crisis magazine's contest in 1926 with his story "Swamp Moccasin". His works were influenced by Harriet Beecher Stowe's Uncle Tom's Cabin, Edgar Allan Poe's tales, and the writings of Phillis Wheatley and Paul Laurence Dunbar.

== Biography ==
John Frederick Matheus was born on September 10, 1887, to John William, a former slave, and Mary Susan Brown Matheus in Keyser, West Virginia. After being threatened at his workplace, his father found a job in Steubenville, Ohio, and the family moved to Ohio. This relocation to a new state and new environment next to the Ohio River was the best opportunity for the young Matheus to collect material for his 24 short stories. In addition to stories drawing on the Ohio landscape, he went on to write stories based on his travels to Africa, Europe, and the Caribbean. In the terms of his writing, he was influenced by other writers such as Edgar Allan Poe, Phillis Wheatley, and Paul Laurence Dunbar. He was interested in writing about themes related to African-American life and experiences.

== Education and career ==
Matheus received a B.A. from Western Reserve University (now Case Western Reserve) in 1910 and received an M.A. from Columbia University in 1921. After starting his graduate studies in Sorbonne in Paris in 1925, he continued his studies at the University of Chicago in 1927. After his first teaching job as Latin instructor and professor of modern languages at Florida Agricultural and Mechanical College in Tallahassee in 1911, he continued to teach throughout his life, teaching foreign languages at West Virginia State College (now West Virginia State University) from 1922 until his retirement in 1958.

By the mid-1920s, his creative writing was receiving critical acclaim and attention. In 1925, he won the first prize of the Opportunity magazine literary contest for his short story "Fog", which was included in Alain Locke's anthology The New Negro. The following year in 1926, Matheus won first prize for drama from Opportunity with his one-act play Cruiter, and his essay "Sand" won first prize in the magazine's "personal experience" category. He received another first prize in the 1926 Crisis magazine contest for his story "Swamp Moccasin". Matheus also published poetry in The Crisis and Opportunity, and his poem "Requiem" was included in Countee Cullen's 1927 anthology Caroling Dusk.

He taught in Haiti from 1927 to the mid-1940s. In 1939, he wrote the libretto of the opera, Ouanga!, based on his knowledge of Haitian history and music. The opera, about Jean-Jacques Dessalines who helped his country to liberate from the French, was performed in Chicago in 1939. In 1956, Ouanga! was performed at the Metropolitan Opera House in New York.

Matheus died in Florida on February 19, 1983, aged 95.
