= The Voice of the Negro (book) =

Newspaper collection publication

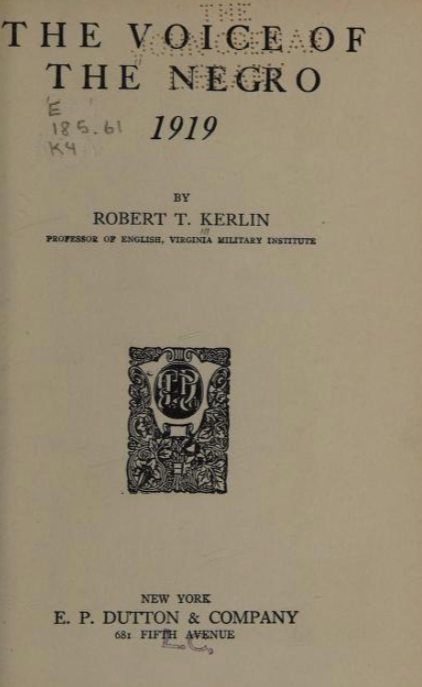
- Title page for The Voice of the Negro: 1919 (1920)
- Author: Robert Kerlin
- Publication date: 1920
- OCLC: 1158273298

The Voice of the Negro: 1919 is a collection of excerpts from African-American newspapers in 1919 that was collected and published by Robert T. Kerlin in 1920.

== Background and publication ==
Robert T. Kerlin was a professor of English at the Virginia Military Institute. He felt that "to know anything about black people, one would have to read their press." In writing the anthology, Kerlin took extracts from African-American newspapers that had been published in the four months after the Washington race riot of 1919. Kerlin wrote that he tried to draw on "virtually the entire Afro-American press", which consisted of two daily papers, twelve magazines, and almost three hundred weekly papers. He grouped them into topics such as "the new negro and the old", black reactions to World War I, reactions to riots, lynchings, labor unionism, and Bolshevism, and "negro progress". The collection ends with several poems by black poets. The book was published in 1920 by E. P. Dutton & Company. The first edition was 200 pages long.

In 1922 Frederick German Detweiler published The Negro Press in the United States, a work that built on Kerlin's.

== Reception ==
The North American Review noted the "ability and influence of the colored press" and its "remarkable" unanimity. They concluded that "whoever thinks that the negro is not foully abused will find Professor Kerlin's book wholesome, though unpleasant, reading." The American Journal of Sociology said that the collection merited "careful reading" by anyone interested in race relations. It felt that Kerlin succeeded in letting the press "speak for itself" and picking a representative sample of excerpts. Mary White Ovington, the chairman of the board of directors of the NAACP and an author, described the book as a "careful synopsis of Negro opinion" and concluded that "even the most diligent reader of the Negro press would be surprised at the comprehensive and able editorial matter that Mr. Kerlin presents."

In 1975 the scholar Theodore Kornweibel wrote that the book offered "about the best introduction to New Negro militancy through a wide variety of primary sources that can be found."

== Bibliography ==
- Kornweibel, Theodore (1975). No crystal stair : Black life and the Messenger, 1917-1928. Westport, Conn. : Greenwood Press. ISBN 978-0-8371-8284-1.
