= C. C. Poindexter (academic) =

American academic and fraternity founder (1880–1913)

- Poindexter (circa 1910)
- Born: Charles Cardoza Poindexter; March 10, 1880; Pennsboro, West Virginia, U.S.
- Died: June 3, 1913 (aged 33); Nashville, Tennessee, U.S.
- Education: Ohio State University; Cornell University
- Known for: Founder of Alpha Phi Alpha Society, which became Alpha Phi Alpha

Charles Cardoza Poindexter (March 10, 1880 – June 3, 1913) was an African American academic and fraternity founder. He was a professor and chair of the Department of Agriculture and Biology at Fisk University. Poindexter was the founder of Alpha Phi Alpha Society, which became the Alpha Phi Alpha fraternity.

== Early life ==
Poindexter was born in Pennsboro, West Virginia, on March 10, 1880. His father was James Poindexter. His paternal grandfather was the Rev. James Poindexter.

He attended high school at the West Virginia Colored Institute (present-day West Virginia State University), graduating in 1896. He then attended a business college in Logansport, Indiana. He returned to the West Virginia Colored Institute for a vocational degree. Poindexter was an assistant teacher at the West Virginia Institute of Technology.

Poindexter enrolled in the Graduate College of Agriculture at Ohio State University from 1899 to 1903. He paid for his tution by working as a stenogrpher for William Ashbrook Kellerman, a professor of botany.At Ohio State, Poindexter was a board member of The Lantern from 1901 to 1902; he was the first African American to serve on the student newspaper's board. In 1901, he represented the university at the Chicago International Livestock Show, responding to the welcoming address.

He wrote articles for a number of periodicals, such as "The Development of the Spikelet and Grain of Corn" for The Ohio Naturalist in 1903. He graduated with a B.Sci. in agriculture in 1903. Poindexter was a graduate student at Cornell University College of Agriculture from 1905 to 1907. While at Cornell, Poindexter wrote an article about a Black student's college experiences that was published in The Voice of the Negro.

== Alpha Phi Alpha Society ==
While a graduate student at Cornell in the fall of 1905, Poindexter organized a Social Study Club, consisting of fifteen male and female students at Cornell University. The group met every two weeks at 421 North Albany Street, where Poindexter roomed. Poindexter was club's president.

At a meeting in December 1905, member Robert Harold Ogle suggested transforming the literary society into a fraternity. There was disagreement about the group's purpose: some wanted to remain a social and literary club where everyone could participate; others wanted a traditional fraternal organization. Poindexter felt the group should serve the cultural and social needs of the Black community and not be an elite secret society. During a meeting on October 23, 1906, members Henry Arthur Callis and Eugene Kinckle Jones proposed changing the club's name to the Greek letter name Alpha Phi Alpha. Thus, Poindexter was the first president of Alpha Phi Alpha.

Poindexter's leadership was significant during the early stages of the organization, convening the group's first banquet and overseeing the development of the initiation procedures and policies. He had a faculty relationship with the society's members because he was the secretary of one of their professors. However, the other members felt that Poindexter, being a graduate student, dominated the meetings of Alpha Phi Alpha.

Seven of the original twelve male members of the club met on December 4, 1906, and voted unanimously to change the club into a fraternity, with Nathaniel A. Murray making a motion that was seconded by Robert H. Ogle. Poindexter was not at the meeting, but had submitted a letter of resignation along with two other members of the club. However, Poindexter's resignation was held for a month due so that he could be contacted for a clearer reason regarding his resignation. Poindexter removed himself from Alpha Phi Alpha and left Cornell to take a job in Virginia in January 1907.

Despite Poindexter's role in the formation of Alpha Phi Alpha, its founding members agreed that his name would not be linked to the early formation of the fraternity. This view was emphatic, especially from Nathaniel A. Murray, who wrote in 1956, "When Mr. Poindexter was told of our plans he said we had no background to follow and therefore used every form of argument he could think of to discourage the idea of a Negro fraternity." Later, members of the fraternity agreed to refer to Poindexter as the Precursor.

== Career ==
In July 1903, Poindexter followed dean and professor of agriculture and domestic science, Thomas Forsyth Hunt, from Ohio State University to Cornell University, where he worked as the professor's private secretary. The Department of Plant Sciences at the University of California, Davis notes that, "Hunt was a central figure in shaping early agricultural education and research in the United States. He championed a “new agriculture”, one that emphasized not just productivity and profit, but also social advancement, education, and leadership for rural communities." Poindexter worked for Hunt from 1903 to 1904 and 1905 to 1907. He helped Hunt prepare The Field Crops of the United States for publication.

Poindexter was an expert demonstrator for the Louisiana Purchase Exposition, the world's fair held in St. Louis, Missouri in 1904. In September 1904, he became an instructor of biology and agricultural chemistry, one of seven faculty members of the new Institute for Colored Youth in Cheyney, Pennsylvania. He also was the director of the agricultural department of the institute, which the training school for teachers.

Poindexter worked as an assistant agriculturist in Hampton, Virginia, in January 1907. He was the director of agriculture for the American Church Institute for Negros in Lawrenceville, Virginia from May 1907 to 1909. He was a Virginia delegate to the Association of American Agricultural Colleges and Experiment Stations Convention in 1907.

In 1909, Poindexter became a professor of agronomy and biology at Fisk University in Nashville, Tennessee. Later, he was the university's chair of the Department of Agriculture and Biology. He implemented programs such as the annual spring day celebration, established in 1913. He also an advisor and member of the student literary society Excelsior. He also traveled with the university's debate team. Among his botany students was Charles H. Wesley, later a member of Alpha Phi Alpha, president of Wilberforce University, and the founding president of Central State University.

Poindexter was a member of the National Education Association and the Middle Tennesse Teachers Association.

== Personal life ==
Poindexter married Helen Florence Newton on March 31, 1906. They had one son.

Poindexter was a member of the Alumni Association of the West Virginia Colored Institute and Ohio State University Association. He was a member of the University Club at Fisk University. He also served on the board of directors of the Colored Orphan Home and Industrial School in Huntington, West Virginia.

Poindexter was a founding member of the French Club in Nashville, Tennessee, where only the French language was spoken. He was also a member of a Science Club in Nashville; other members were faculty of Fisk University, the Nashville City Schools, and Meherry Medical. The club met every two weeks and feature lectures by its members; Poindexter presented a series of lectures on agronomy.

Poindexter died at the age of 33 on June 3, 1913, in a hospital in Nashville, as a result of complications after surgery for an appendicitis. His funeral was held in the Fisk University Chapel, with students serving as pallbearers. He was buried in Greenwood Cemetery.
