= Fenton Johnson (poet) =

American poet

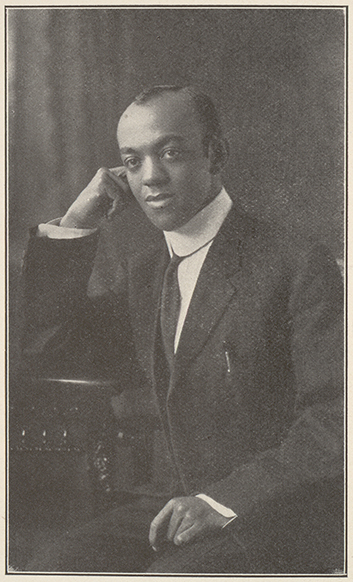
- Portrait of Fenton Johnson published in Visions of the Dusk (1915)
- Born: May 7, 1888; Chicago, Illinois
- Died: September 17, 1958 (aged 70); Chicago, Illinois
- Education: Northwestern University; University of Chicago; Columbia University
- Writing career
- Language: English
- Genre: Poetry

Fenton Johnson (May 7, 1888 – September 17, 1958) was an American poet, essayist, author of short stories, editor, and educator. Johnson came from a middle-class African-American family in Chicago, where he spent most of his career. His work is often included in anthologies of 20th-century poetry, and he is noted for early prose poetry. Author James Weldon Johnson (no relation) called Fenton, "one of the first Negro revolutionary poets”. He is also considered a forerunner of the Harlem Renaissance.

== Early life and career ==
Johnson was born on May 7, 1888, in Chicago, Illinois, to parents Elijah and Jesse (Taylor) Johnson. His father, Elijah Johnson, was a railroad porter and their African-American family was comparatively well-off. His family owned the State Street building in which they lived, and according to a biographical note by Arna Bontemps, Fenton Johnson was described as being "a dapper boy who drove his own electric automobile around Chicago." Growing up, Johnson recalled that he "scribbled since the age of nine," but despite literary inclinations, Johnson did not initially plan to embark on a writing career, and certainly not a career in poetry. Throughout his childhood, Johnson intended to become a member of the clergy.

Johnson grew up in Chicago, and he received his secondary education at various public schools in the city, including Englewood High School and Wendell Phillips High School. Johnson first began his undergraduate education at Northwestern University, which he attended from 1908 to 1909 and he went on to a degree at the University of Chicago. Johnson later attended the Columbia University Pulitzer School of Journalism.

Following school, Fenton worked as a messenger and in the post office before he began to teach English at the State University of Louisville (SUL), which was a private, black, Baptist-owned institution in Kentucky that would later would be known as Simmons College. He taught there from 1910 to 1911, and returned to Chicago in 1911 to concentrate on his writing career.

== Literary career ==
In 1913, Johnson published his first volume of poetry, A Little Dreaming. The collection was a self-published work, along with his next two collections, Visions of the Dusk (1915) and Songs of the Soil (1916). Earlier, in 1909, Johnson appears to have submitted for publication a form of realistic-fiction diary, titled "A Wild Plaint", written in the name of a character, Aubrey Gray. This manuscript, which remained unpublished, is "a vivid depiction of discrimination", with the entries "alternately optimistic, angry, depressed, and frustrated. At the conclusion of the fictional journal, Gray commits suicide, explaining that it is 'due to this color-prejudice…that I do what I am doing.' Johnson's discussion of prejudice and persecution includes racial epithets and racial and ethnic stereotypes."

Between the release of his first and second collection of poetry, Johnson moved to New York, where he attended the Columbia School of Journalism with the financial support of a benefactor. Following the release of his third book of poetry, Johnson moved back to Chicago, where he became one of the founding editors of The Champion in 1916. The Champion was formed in conjunction with Henry Bing Dismond, his cousin, who was also an aspiring poet and popular athlete, one of the few African-American college graduates chosen for officer training with the Army's Eighth Illinois Regiment at Camp Des Moines in 1918. The publication focused on black achievements and was published monthly. Two years after founding The Champion, in 1918, Johnson went on to found The Favorite Magazine, subtitled The World’s Greatest Monthly, with Dismond.

The Favorite Magazine published a few of Johnson's poems, and around this time Johnson's short stories were also being published in The Crisis. In addition to the short stories published in The Crisis, Johnson published his own collection of short stories entitled Tales of Darkest America in 1920. In the same year, he published a book of essays entitled For the Highest Good. During this period, from about 1912 to 1925, Johnson established connections in Chicago with Harriet Monroe, and several of his poems were accepted for her magazine, Poetry. In addition, Johnson found publication in the anthology selected by poet Alfred Kreymborg in 1915 called Others: A Magazine of the New Verse. One of his most famous poems, "Tired", was published in 1919 in Others and it was also published in The Book of American Negro Poetry in 1922, among other poems of his. Johnson completed or nearly completed a fourth collection of poems entitled African Nights, but he did not succeed in publishing the collection.

In addition to his poetry, editing, and essay writing, Johnson also worked as a playwright. By the age of 19, Johnson plays had been "produced on the stage of the old Pekin Theatre, Chicago". In 1925, his play entitled The Cabaret Girl was performed at the Shadow Theatre in Chicago, the only known title of his performed plays.

In the 1930s, Johnson worked for the Federal Writers’ Project, which was part of the Works Progress Administration (WPA) in Chicago. Directed by Arna Bontemps, part of the Federal Writers’ Project focused on writing about the black experience in Illinois. Bontemps later acted as Johnson's literary executor.

Johnson's poetry has a consistent presence in anthologies, including Weldon Johnsons, The Book of American Negro Poetry; Harriet Monroe and Alice Corbin's The New Poetry: An Anthology of Twentieth Century Verse in English (1923); and Countee Cullen’s Caroling Dusk (1927).

== Criticism and reception ==
The poetry of Fenton Johnson has often been seen by critics to be characterized by great irony and a kind of hopelessness resulting from an embattled African American experience. In his introduction to Fenton Johnson in The Book of American Negro Poetry, James Weldon Johnson writes that in many of Johnson’s poems, "there is nothing left to fight or even hope for." Yet, James Weldon Johnson continues, "these poems of despair possess tremendous power and constitute Fenton Johnson’s best work." Fenton Johnson is often seen as a poet who possesses a particularly fatalistic perspective branching from his experience as an African American, and this type of embittered poetry is what he is most known for. Also in his introduction, Johnson makes a few claims about Johnson's earlier works, finding that his first book of poetry, A Little Dreaming, “was without marked distinction.”

James Weldon Johnson also indicates in his introduction to Johnson that it was during the war period that Fenton Johnson adopted free verse, and “broke away from all traditions and ideas of Negro Poetry.” This newfound "formlessness", Johnson found, "voiced the disillusionment and bitterness of feeling the Negro race was then experiencing." For James Weldon Johnson, then, Fenton Johnson's poetry became associated with despair, and such was how Johnson became framed within the larger The Book of the American Negro Poetry project, and subsequently in other anthologies. This "bitter" Fenton is particularly encapsulated in the lines of his poem "Tired": "I am tired of work. I am tired of building up somebody else’s civilization," the poem reads.

Johnson has a particular legacy within American Modernist poetry. He is noted to have been a part of writers who would become the makers of a "new" poetry, which sought to "throw over the traditions of American Poetry", as James Weldon Johnson would describe it. These "new" poems appeared in such magazines as Poetry, Others, and later, The Liberator, and they marked a progression from "commonplace traditionalism to the most revolutionary naturalism, from the rhymed, carefully scanned line to free verse, from conventionalized Negro dialect to the brawny language of [Carl] Sandberg’s Chicago Poems."

While "Tired" has been frequently anthologized, Johnson's earlier poems were made in more "conventional modes", including dialect poetry, as found in his first book, A Little Dreaming. The collection considered a wide range of topics, from a poem on Paul Laurence Dunbar, entitled "Dunbar", to medieval themes such as in "Lancelot’s Defiance". Additionally, A Little Dreaming contains a customary Scottish poem, Irish poem, and even Yiddish poem, which points to a whole range of poetic influences during the early part of his poetic career. In Visions of the Dusk and Songs of the Soil, Johnson begins to incorporate "Negro spirituals", and here the transition into themes more heavily influenced by the African-American experience might be observed. In Songs of the Soil, Johnson writes that "The Negro has a history, and it is something more than a peasant." Transitioning from here to the poem "Tired", we might find the "black revolutionary poet" that James Weldon Johnson proclaims Fenton Johnson to be and how many perceive him today.

In 2016, Johnson was inducted into the Chicago Literary Hall of Fame. In their induction notes, the Hall of Fame writes:

"The language poet, Ron Silliman, in his 1987 collection of critical essays The New Sentence, pointed specifically to Johnson as the first American author to introduce 'prose poem with a clear, if simple, sentence:paragraph relation.' Silliman was particularly enthralled by Johnson’s The Minister, which he argues, is the 'first instance in English of a prose poem which calls attention to a discursive or poetic effect.' By this, Silliman means to say that Johnson’s prose poetry was perhaps one of the first to expand what poetry might look and sound like—here no longer conforming to meter or rhyme but a new repetitive logic, the sentence itself. As Silliman notes in his essay, Johnson’s poetry effectively points the way to [William Carlos] Williams and Gertrude Stein amongst others."

== Personal life ==
Johnson was married to Cecilia Rhone. He was a member of the Authors League of America and of Alpha Phi Alpha fraternity.

== Works ==
- A Little Dreaming. The Peterson linotyping company. 1913. p. 2. "poet Fenton Johnson."
- Visions of the Dusk. F. J. 1915. "Fenton Johnson (poet)."
- Songs of the Soil. F. J. 1916.
- Tales of Darkest America. Favorite Magazine. 1920. p. 5. "poet Fenton Johnson."

=== Anthologies ===
- Harriet Monroe and Alice Corbin, The New Poetry: An Anthology of Twentieth Century Verse in English (1923);
- Countee Cullen, Caroling Dusk (1927).
- James Weldon Johnson, The Book of American Negro Poetry (1931)
- Arna Bontemps, American Negro Poetry from (1963)
- Abraham Chapman, Black Voices: An Anthology of African American Literature (1968)
- Ruth Miller, Black American Literature: 1760–Present (1971)
- Richard Barksdale and Kenneth Kinnamon, Black Writers of America: A Comprehensive Anthology (1972)
- Robert Hayden, Kaleidoscope (1982)
- Arthur P. Davis, J. Saunders Redding and Joyce Ann Joyce, The New Cavalcade (1991)
- Library of America, American Poetry of the Twentieth Century Volume I (2000)
- Henry Louis Gates Jr. and Nellie McKay, Norton Anthology of African American Literature (2004)
