= Clarissa Scott Delany =

American poet (1901–1927)

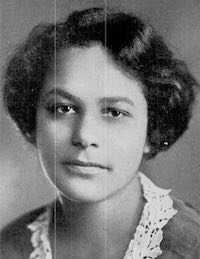
Clarissa Mae Scott, from the cover of The Crisis (July 1923)

Clarissa Scott Delany, nee Clarissa Mae Scott (1901–1927) was an African-American poet, essayist, educator and social worker associated with the Harlem Renaissance.

== Life ==
Clarissa Mae Scott was the daughter of Emmett Jay Scott, secretary to Booker T. Washington, and Elenor Baker Scott. She was born and grew up in Tuskegee, Alabama, and was educated at Bradford Academy and Wellesley College, joining Delta Sigma Theta and graduating with Phi Beta Kappa honors in 1923. After travelling in France and Germany, she taught for three years at Dunbar High School in Washington, D.C. While in Washington she attended Georgia Douglas Johnson's literary salon, the Saturday Nighters Club.

Scott's four published poems are unusual in that she does not discuss specific struggles, but speaks more allegorically. Her work was positively received by Alice Dunbar-Nelson, Angeline Weld Grimké, and W. E. B. Du Bois.

In 1926 Scott married the attorney Hubert Thomas Delany, and they moved to New York City. She worked as a social worker, collecting statistics for a "Study of Delinquent and Neglected Negro Children" in New York City with the National Urban League and the Women's City Club. In 1927 she died of kidney disease, after experiencing six months of a streptococcal infection.

American author, professor and literary critic Samuel R. Delany is her nephew.

== Works ==
=== Poems ===
- "Solace", in Opportunity: A Journal of Negro Life, 1925
- "Joy", in Opportunity: A Journal of Negro Life, 1926
- "The Mask", in Palms, 1926
- "Interim", in Countee Cullen, ed., Caroling Dusk: An Anthology of Verse by Negro Poets, 1927

=== Essays ===
- "A Golden Afternoon in Germany", in Opportunity: A Journal of Negro Life
