= Max Barber =

American journalist (1878–1949)

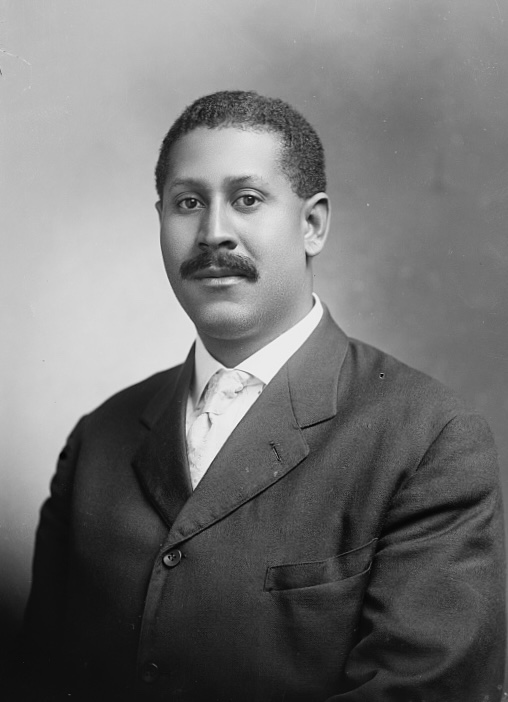
Jesse Max Barber by C. M. Bell Studio

Jesse Max Barber (July 5, 1878 – September 20, 1949) was an African-American journalist, teacher and dentist.

== Biography ==
Born in Blackstock, South Carolina, to former slave parents, Jesse Max Barber was educated at Benedict College and Virginia Union University, where he was student editor of the university journal and president of the literary society. After graduation in 1903 he began working for the Voice of the Negro, a monthly literary magazine founded in 1904 in Atlanta, eventually becoming its editor-in-chief. Barber, one of the founders of the Niagara Movement in 1905, sought out younger and more radical black writers for the Voice. By 1906 the Voice was the leading black magazine in the United States, with a circulation of 15,000. After the Atlanta Riots in 1906, Barber faced threats from white vigilantes and was forced to flee to Chicago. There he was unable to secure financial backing for his magazine, and Voice of the Negro folded in 1907. Barber's radicalism had made an enemy of Booker T. Washington, whose interventions caused Barber to lose jobs as a newspaper editor in Chicago and as a teacher in Philadelphia. To escape Washington's influence, in 1909 Barber retrained at the Philadelphia Dental School and on graduation in 1912 he set up a Philadelphia dental practice.

In 1923, Barber attended and spoke what was hoped to be an annual "pilgrimage" of Blacks from "all parts of the Union" at John Brown's grave, in North Elba, New York.
