= Joshua Henry Jones =

American poet

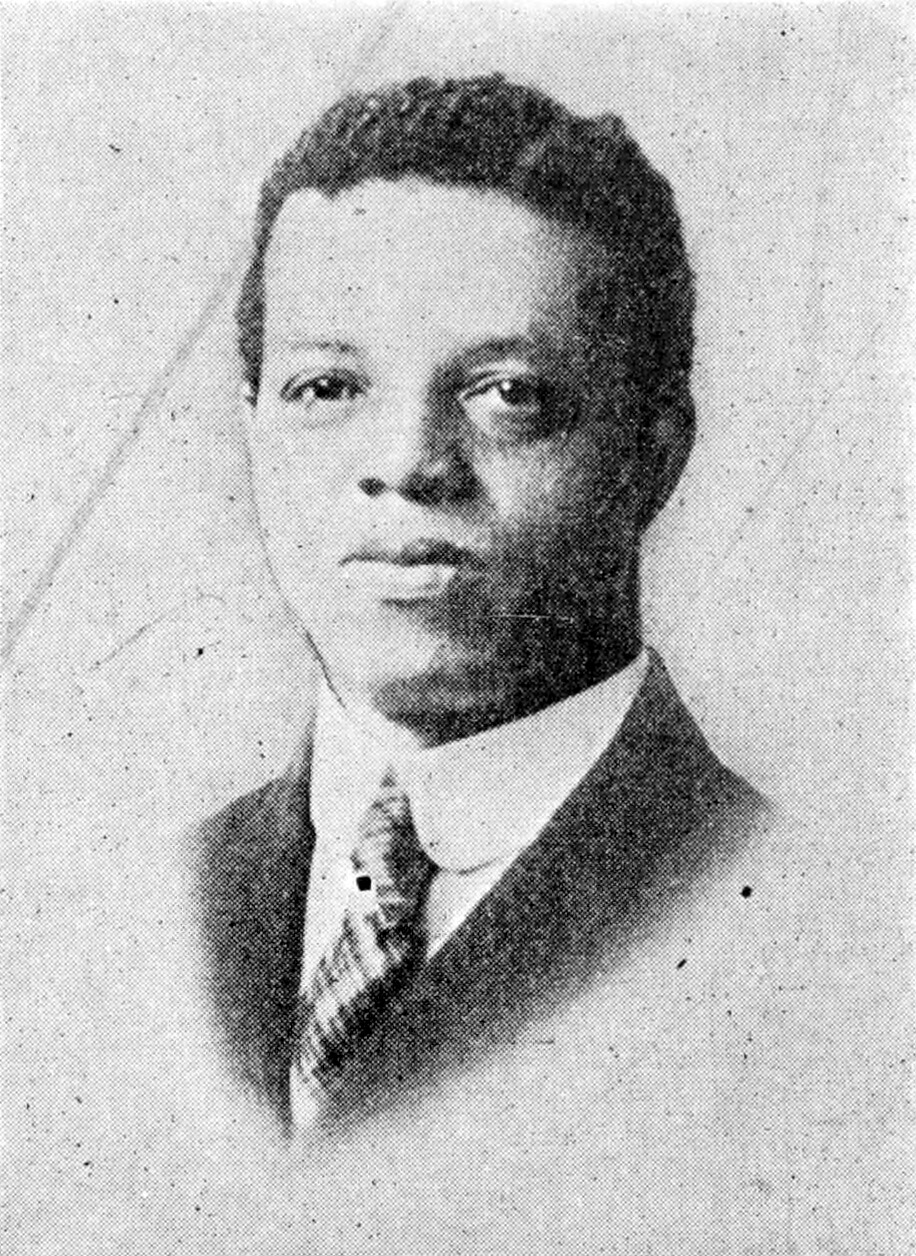
- Jones in 1923
- Born: Joshua Henry Jones Jr. Orangeburg, South Carolina, U.S.
- Died: December 14, 1955
- Education: Ohio State University; Yale University; Brown University
- Occupations: Composer; poet; novelist
- Children: 2

Joshua Henry Jones Jr. (? - December 14, 1955) was an American composer, poet, and novelist. He was photographed in 1923. His poem "To a Skull" was included in James Weldon Johnson's 1922 book The Book of American Negro Poetry. Robert Thomas Kerlin included him in his 1923 poetry anthology Negro Poets and Their Poems.

== Early life ==
He was born in Orangeburg, South Carolina and grew up in South Carolina. His father was a bishop in the A.M.E. church.

== Career ==
His poems were published, including one collection called "Poems of the Four Seas". He also wrote the novel By Sanction of Law about a marriage between an African American man and a Caucasian woman. It was published in 1924 by B. J. Brimmer Company in Boston. It was loosely based on his own experiences. It was banned from the Boston Public Library system. In 1923, he wrote the words for Boston's official hymn, "Dear Old Boston".

He studied at Ohio State University and Yale University. He graduated from Brown University. He married his college sweetheart, a sculptor and Canadian immigrant. They had two children. He was referred to as Boston's poet laureate.

He wrote about Boston Common in Our Boston. Some of his poems addressed World War I.

== Books ==
=== Poetry ===
- The Heart of the World (1919)
- Poems of the Four Seas (1921)

=== Novels ===
- By Sanction of Law (1924), dedicated to his father and Boston mayor James M. Curley
