= Otto Bohanan =

Otto Leland Bohanan
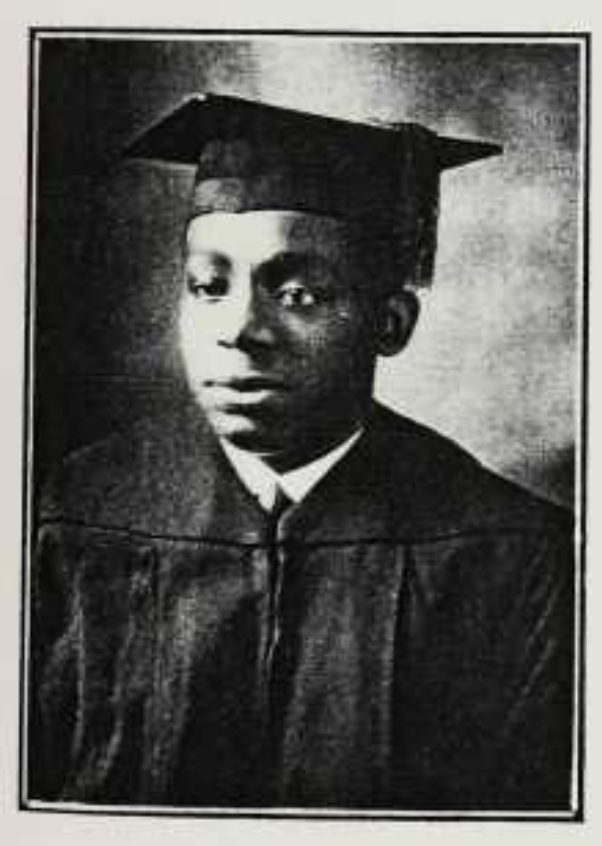
- Born: Not recognized as a date. Years must have 4 digits (use leading zeros for years < 1000).
- Died: December 6, 1932 (aged 36–37)
- Education: Howard University

Otto Leland Bohanan (1895-1932) was an African-American poet and composer.

== Biography ==
Bohanan was born in Washington, D.C., in 1892-1895, the son of Addison and Julia A. Beverly Bohanan.

He graduated from M Street High School in 1910, and attended Catholic University of America for a year before transferring to Howard University. At Howard, Bohanan was a member of the fraternity Omega Psi Phi. He graduated with a B.A. in 1914.

He was offered a position teaching English at Howard, but instead pursued a career in music. He opened a music studio in New York City around April 1920. In 1928, Bohanan received an MA from Teachers College at Columbia University. At Columbia, he joined Kappa Delta Pi.

In 1931, Bohanan married Florence Dulcia Coffer, a public school teacher, in Greenwich, Connecticut. At the time of his death, Bohanan was a teacher of music at DeWitt Clinton High School in New York.

He died on December 6, 1932, in New York City and was buried in Washington, D.C.

== Creative career ==
Bohanan published several poems in the African American magazine, The Crisis, between 1914 and 1919. The 1915 issue of the Howard University Yearbook, NIKH, includes Bohanan's poem "On Rankin Chapel." Two of his poems were included in the influential anthology edited by James Weldon Johnson, The Book of American Negro Poetry (1922). His poems were also anthologized in Readings from Negro Authors: For Schools and Colleges (1931), Robert Kerlin's Negro Poets and Their Poems (1935), and the Work Progress Administration's An Anthology of Negro Poetry (1937).

In parallel with his poetry writing, Bohanan pursued a musical career as a singer and composer. He composed Omega Psi Phi's first fraternity hymn, "Omega Men Draw Nigh," in 1917. Bohanan also had a career as a singer in New York City; he is listed as a performer in the first performance of Harry Lawrence Freeman's 1928 opera, "Voodoo," as staged and broadcast on the radio on WGBS on May 20, 1928. Ten of Bohanan's original musical scores are held in manuscript form at the University of Pennsylvania.
