= Newman Ivey White =

- Born: February 3, 1892; Statesville, North Carolina
- Died: December 6, 1948 (aged 56); Cambridge, Massachusetts
- Resting place: Statesville, North Carolina
- Education: Trinity College of Duke University, Harvard
- Occupation: English Professor
- Employer: Duke University
- Spouse: Marie Anne Updyke

Newman Ivey White (February 3, 1892 – December 6, 1948) was an American professor of English at Duke University. He was born in Statesville, North Carolina, United States. He was a noted Shelley scholar, as well as a collector of American folklore, including folk songs and Duke limericks. He served as Professor of English at Trinity College and Duke University from 1919 to 1948. He wrote American Negro Folk Songs (1928) and in it he quoted a work song, sung by laborers in Augusta, Georgia, which mentioned the notorious Judge Fogarty. White also recalled hearing a version in Statesville, North Carolina in 1903.

A professorship at Duke has been named in his honor.

== Publications ==
- An Anthology of Verse by American Negroes 1924
- American Negro Folk Songs 1928
- Shelley 1940
- Portrait of Shelley 1945
