= Silas X. Floyd =

Silas Xavier Floyd
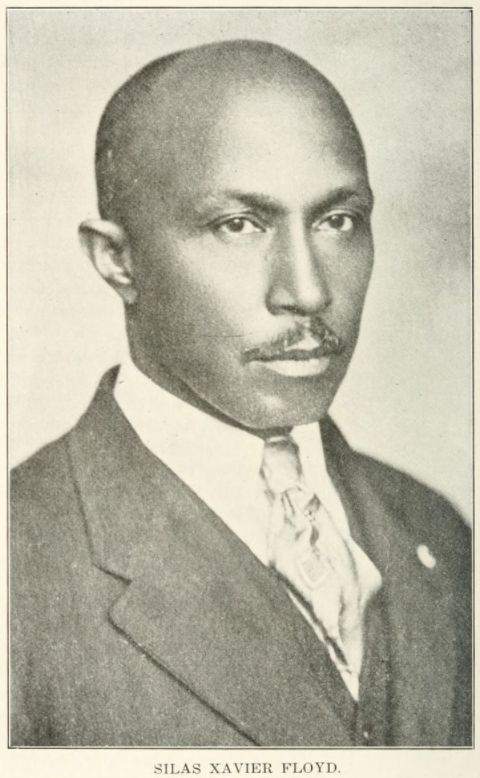
- Silas Xavier Floyd in 1920
- Born: 1869; Augusta, Georgia
- Died: September 19, 1923 (aged 53–54) (Note: A notice in the New York Age lists his age at death as 58.); Augusta, Georgia
- Occupations: Writer, preacher, journalist
- Political party: Republican

Silas Xavier Floyd (1869 – September 19, 1923) was an African-American educator, preacher, and journalist. Active in Augusta, Georgia, he was a writer and editor at the Augusta Sentinel and later wrote for the Augusta Chronicle. In 1892 he co-founded the Negro Press Association of Georgia. He was pastor at Augusta's Tabernacle Baptist Church and was a prominent agent of the International Sunday School Convention. He was also a public school principal and an officer of the National Association of Teachers in Colored Schools.

== Personal life ==
Floyd's father, David Floyd was born in 1829 in Sandersville, Georgia. He was likely born a slave and married a woman named Sarah Jane and had seven children. Silas was born in Augusta on October 2, 1869, four years after the end of the American Civil War and six years after the Emancipation Proclamation. David Floyd was a preacher and a model for his son. Silas worked as a boy, delivering papers and shining shoes. One noted customer of Floyd's was merchant J. B. White, with whom Floyd would have a lifelong relationship. Floyd also began following a religious path early in his life, aiding in holding religious services at a jail with the YMCA in 1883.

Floyd attended Ware High School where he was valedictorian and was an outstanding and honored student. He graduated from Atlanta University in May 1891. Floyd gave an oration at the graduation and his class numbered five graduates of the college course including educator Julius Clifton Styles and physician Loring Brainard Palmer and nine graduates of the normal (teaching) course, including Helena Brown Cobb and Adrienne McNeil Herndon. In 1894 he received an A.M. from the school.

On May 6, 1900, Silas married Ella Drayton James, who had one child, Marietta, with her former husband barber Owen C. James. Ella had three sisters, Katie, Henrietta and Mary. Mary married a sea captain and moved to Jacksonville, Florida. Their daughter, Ella's niece, Nora, married composer J. Rosamond Johnson. Ella was the daughter of Samuel and Nora Drayton.

Silas X. Floyd died in Augusta on September 19, 1923.

== Career ==
After graduation, Floyd continued to be associated with the Augusta Sentinel, for which he was an editor by 1891. In 1892 he cofounded the Negro Press Association of Georgia and later served as the body's president.

Floyd was active in religious life, joining a Baptist church at the age of 12, being licensed to preach in 1896, and soon after being ordained. In 1899 he was pastor of Tabernacle Church. Floyd was also an agent of the International Sunday School Convention beginning at the Boston convention of the organization in 1896. In 1900, Charles T. Walker of Augusta's Tabernacle Baptist Church moved to lead a church in New York City, and Floyd, who had been his assistant, stepped in to lead the body. In 1901, Floyd became the representative of the American Baptist Publication in Alabama and Georgia. In 1903 he received a degree of Doctor of Divinity from Morris Brown University.

While a college student, Floyd taught school in the region during the summers and spent one year working in Boston. He returned south and served as principal of a public school in Augusta from the early 1890s into the late 1910s.

Starting in 1915, Floyd was the corresponding secretary and the chairman of the publicity committee of the National Association of Teachers in Colored Schools then led by John Manuel Gandy. In 1918, the association established the National Note-Book quarterly magazine with Floyd as its editor.

Floyd was an outspoken proponent of religious education, industrial education, and labor rights. He also spoke in favor of limiting black involvement in politics, recommending focus on development and advancement of African Americans. This position was similar to that of Booker T. Washington, who influenced Floyd. Floyd was appointed secretary of the Colored State Food Conservation Board of Georgia by Governor Hugh Dorsey in early 1918.

Floyd became an important civic leader. In 1916, Floyd chaired the Colored Charitable Relief Fund in the aftermath of the Great Augusta Fire. Floyd and Walker were liaisons between the black and white communities in Augusta. After the death of his old friend and benefactor, J. B White, Floyd was appointed as a member of the committee to decide how his money would be spent, advocating for some of the money to be put towards the building of a new grammar school for black students. Politically, Floyd was a Republican and was a member of the Richmond County and State Executive Committees.

Floyd’s published writings include a biography of Charles T. Walker, a children’s book titled Floyd’s Flowers, a book of sermons titled The Gospel of Service and Other Sermons, and numerous poems and articles in national publications including Lippincott's Monthly Magazine. In 1902 he was elected a member of the American Academy of Political and Social Sciences, and the Augusta Chronicle called Floyd the "Paul Laurence Dunbar of the South". Floyd's Flowers argued for optimism, hard work, and determination in the face of violence and racial lynching and is often paired with books by Edward A. Johnson in its literary reevaluation of slavery and reconstruction by African American post-Reconstruction authors.

After Floyd's death, his library was donated to Atlanta University. Members of Alpha Phi Alpha fraternity purchased the house where he lived from 1906 to his death for their chapter house in 1953 and placed a historical marker about Floyd in the front of the building. Floyd was a member of the historic Bannaker Lodge #3 F & A.M. PHA, the third oldest Prince Hall-affiliated masonic lodge in the state of Georgia. The former Silas X. Floyd Elementary School was named for Floyd.
