= Walter Everette Hawkins =

African-American writer

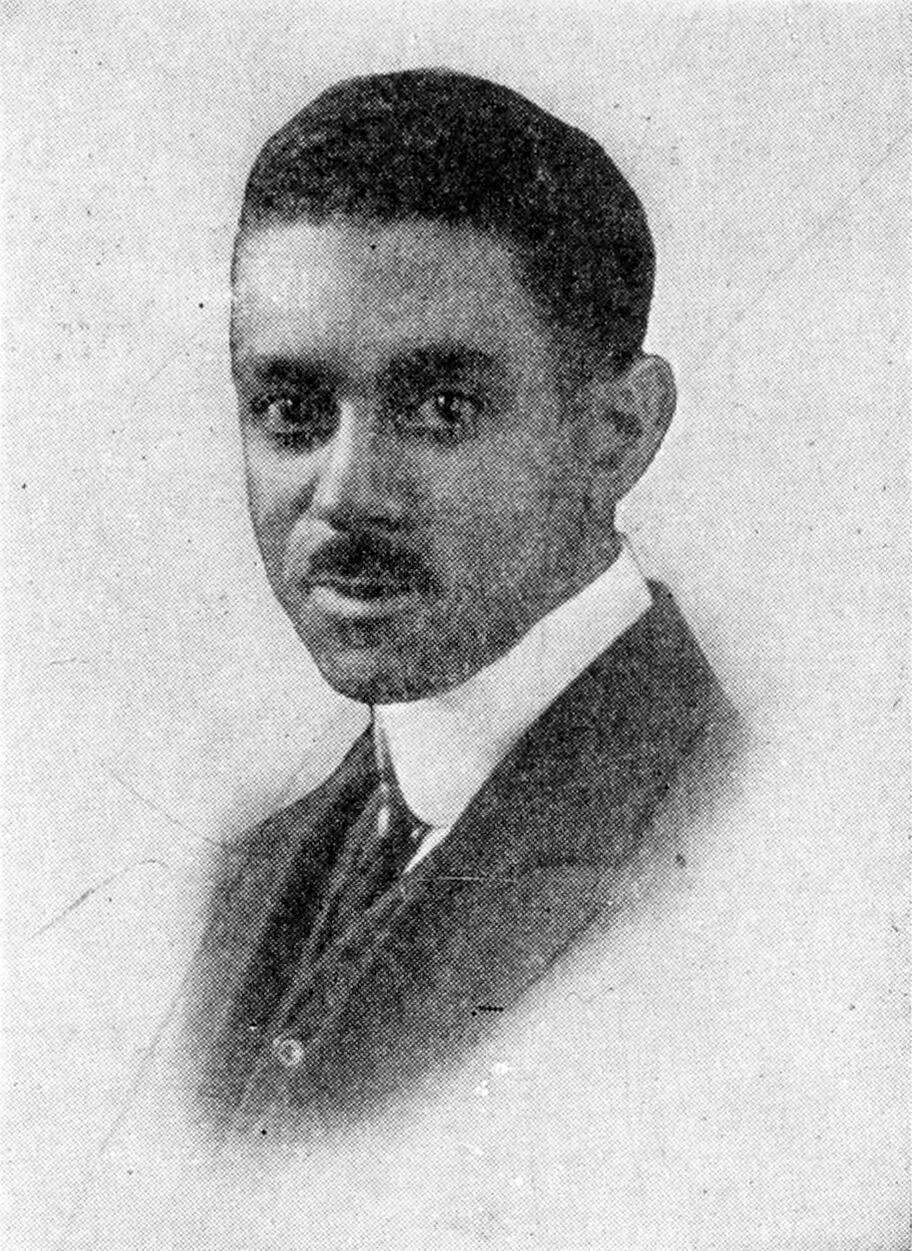
- Born: November 17, 1883; Warrenton, North Carolina
- Died: Unknown
- Education: Kittrell College
- Occupations: Poet, mail clerk

Walter Everette Hawkins (November 17, 1883 – unknown) was a poet, mail clerk, and freethinker, described as being 'an important figure in the transition of black literature from the genteel modes of the nineteenth century to the flowering of black militancy often identified with the Harlem Renaissance'.

== Life ==
Hawkins was born on November 17, 1883, in North Carolina, the thirteenth child of formerly enslaved parents. One of Hawkins' older brothers, John R. Hawkins — though a railway mail service worker when Walter was born — went on to become a teacher and the president of Kittrell College. Walter Everette Hawkins received some schooling in Warrenton, graduated from Kittrell College in 1901, and later left North Carolina for Washington. There, he worked as a mail clerk for the post office, and wrote poetry. 'My only recreation,' he wrote, was 'in stealing away to be with the masters, the intellectual dynamos, of the world, who converse with me without wincing and deliver me the key to life's riddle.'

Hawkins' first published collection was Chords and Discords (originally published in 1909, and again, revised, in 1920). He wrote in his preface to Chords and Discords:

My greatest reward lies in the hope that some Chords herein struck may be the inspiration of some into whose hands they may come, and set into motion a stream of fellow-feeling, of friendship and love flowing from them to me and from me to them, thence to all the hearts that throb and thrill with the joy that makes kings and queens of this our common clay.

In 1936, now living in Brooklyn, New York, Hawkins published Petals from the Poppies.

== Beliefs ==
Although, as Dickson D. Bruce Jr. has noted, Hawkins' poems 'were well within the bounds of turn-of-the-century black writing, formally conservative and employing themes and images recognizable to anyone familiar with black literature from the period,' he made important departures in some of his works - notably those attacking religion and societal hypocrisy. His 'outspokenness and... blunt language' in doing so 'betokened a militancy that made Hawkins much more than simply a purveyor of tradition'. Hawkins was vocal in his distaste for religion, and for what he felt was hypocritical behaviour in those who were religious but racially discriminatory. In 'Credo', Hawkins wrote:

I am an Agnostic. / I accept nothing without questioning. / It is my inherent right and duty / To ask the reason why. / To accept without a reason / Is to debase one’s humanity / And destroy the fundamental process / In the ascertainment of Truth.

In Negro Poets and their Poems, Robert Thomas Kerlin described this as 'a faithful self-characterization—such a man in reality is Walter Everette Hawkins. A fearless and independent and challenging spirit.' He saw the striving for racial justice as central to his role as a Black poet. Hawkins admired W. E. B. Du Bois, and was drawn to ideas of Black distinctiveness and a celebration of African-American heritage and culture. He was a member of the Negro Society for Historical Research, and published poems in the African Times and Orient Review, and in The Crisis. Hawkins was also closely associated (albeit for a short time) with The Messenger, edited by A. Philip Randolph and Chandler Owen. One poem printed in The Messenger, an anti-lynching poem called 'The Mob Victim', was singled out in a 1919 report by the United States Department of Justice, used to prove that the magazine was 'particularly radical'.

In the preface to Petals from the Poppies (1936), he expressed his belief that 'since all Art is to a large extent propaganda', poetry should 'ally itself with the forces contending mightily for universal justice, freedom and peace; and against all those influence and institutions of evil, oppression and cruelty'.
