= Ware High School (Augusta, Georgia) =

School for African American students in Augusta, Georgia

Ware High School was a school for African American students in Augusta, Georgia. It opened in 1880 and was the first high school for African Americans in Georgia. It was founded by Richard A. Wright. The school was closed by the school district in 1897 despite a legal challenge. The school's alumni include Silas X. Floyd and Nathan W. Collier, the first president of Florida Normal and Technical Institute (predecessor of Florida Memorial University) from 1896 until 1941.

In 1897 the school board decided to close the high school and replace it with four primary schools for "colored" children in the same building. The board asserted that African American high school students in Augusta could attend Haines Industrial School, Walker Baptist Institute, or Payne Institute (Augusta, Georgia).

June Patton wrote about the struggle to save the high school.
