= George Marion McClellan =

American writer (1860–1934)

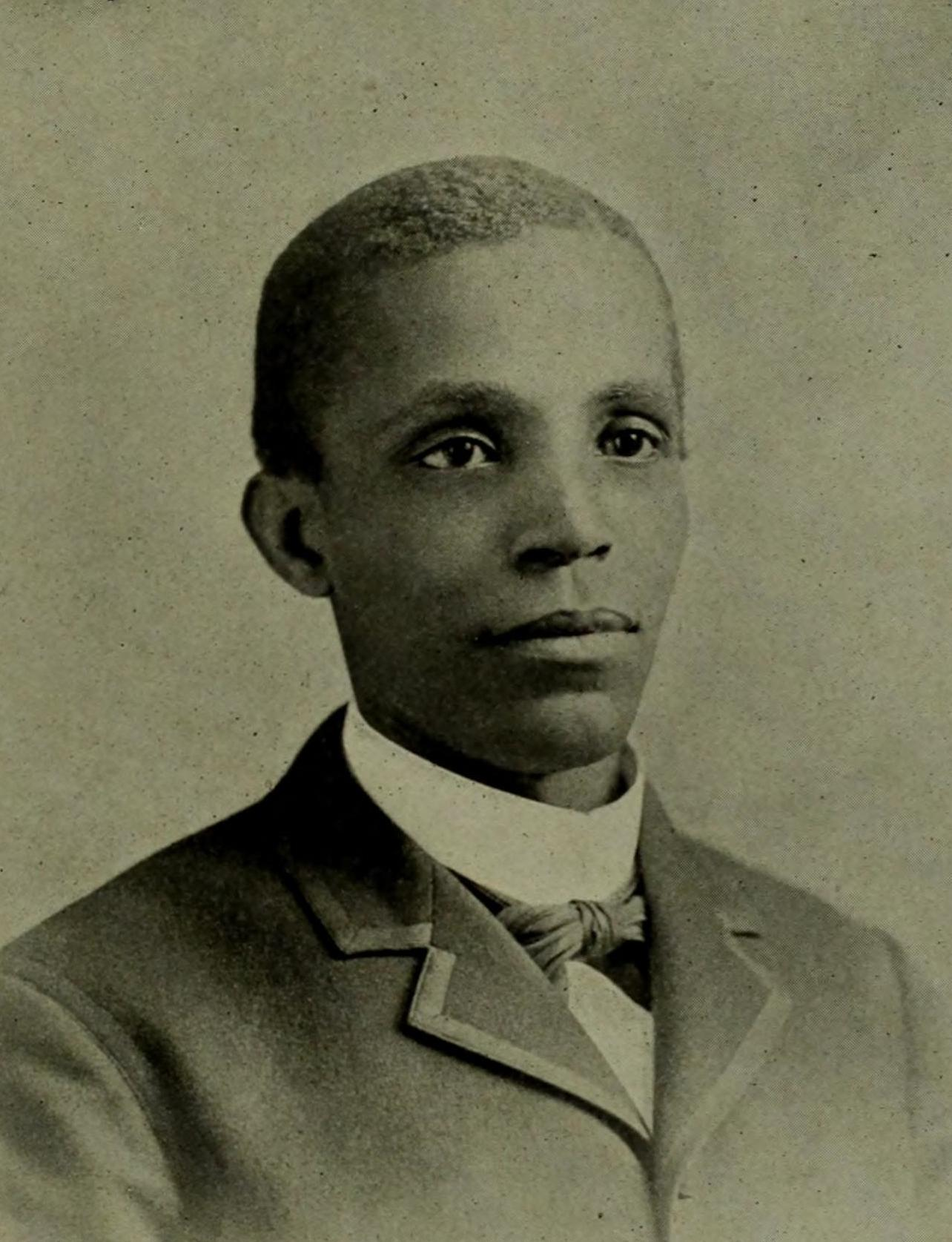
- George Marion McClellan circa 1902
- Born: September 29, 1860; Belfast
- Died: May 17, 1934; New York City

George Marion McClellan (September 29, 1860 – May 17, 1934) was an American writer. Born in Tennessee, McClellan was educated at Fisk University and Hartford Theological Seminary. He worked as a Congregationalist minister and as a high school teacher and principal. His writing, generally self-published, included both prose and poetry. Critical assessment of McClellan's work is divided. Some see it as unoriginal, while others argue that it reveals emotional depth.

== Early life and education ==
George Marion McClellan was born on September 29, 1860, in Belfast, Tennessee, to Eliza (Leonard) and George Fielding McClellan.

He received an AB and MA from Fisk University in 1885 and 1890, respectively, and attended Hartford Theological Seminary (now Hartford International University for Religion and Peace) from 1885 to 1887, eventually receiving a bachelor's of divinity in 1891.

== Career ==
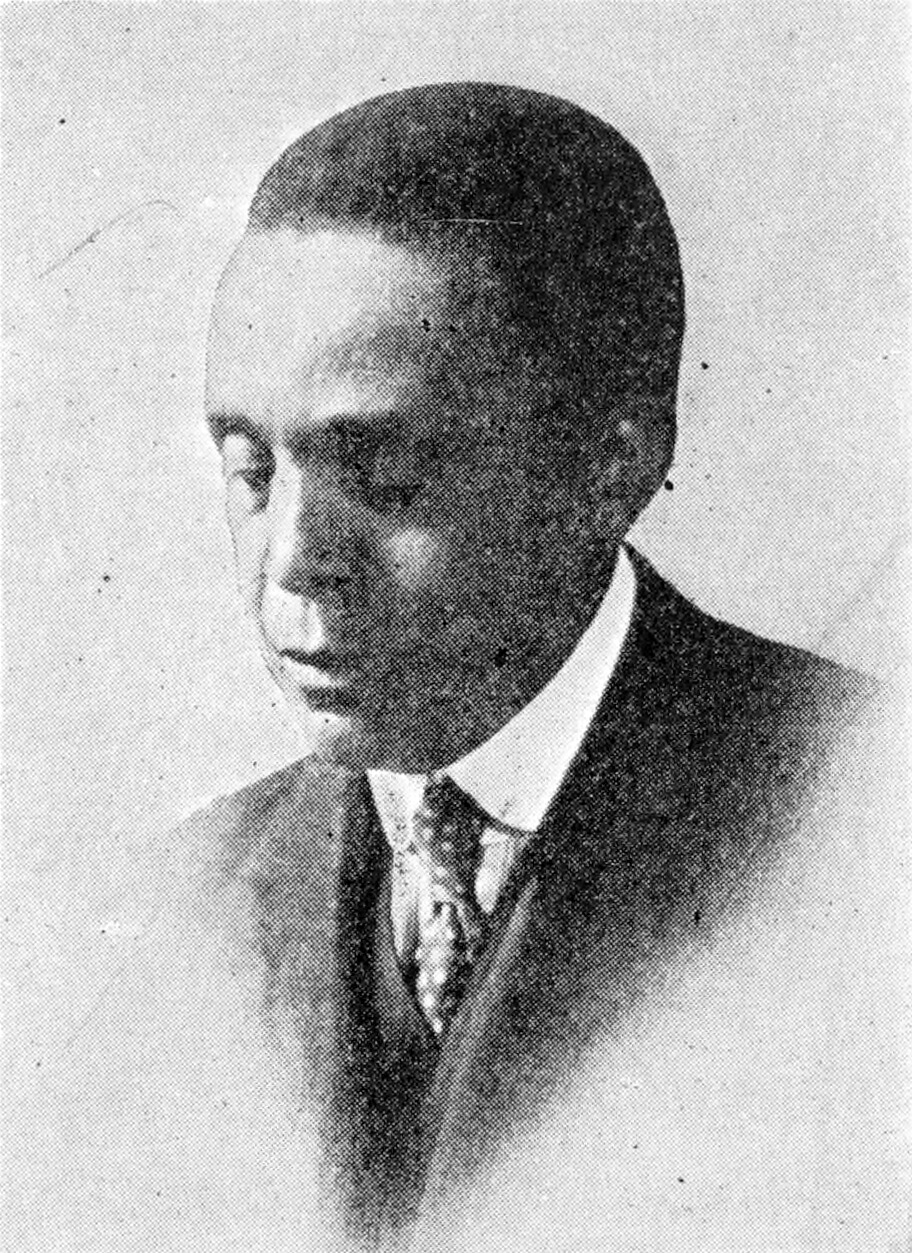
McClellan in Negro Poets and Their Poems (1923)

In 1887 McClellan came to Louisville, Kentucky, to work as a Congregationalist minister, later taking a pastoral position in Memphis, Tennessee. Between 1892 and 1894, he worked in New England as a financial agent for Fisk University.

He taught high school and worked as a principal from 1899 to 1919 in Louisville.

Poems, McClellan's first book, was published in 1895 by the African Methodist Episcopal Church and financed with McClellan's money.

Old Greenbottom Inn and Other Stories (1906) collects almost all McClellan's prose fiction, including a novella, except a story called "Gabe Yowl". All the stories in the collection are about rural Alabama and, except for one, are about Black women.

Path of Dreams (1916) was published in part to raise funds for McClellan's son Theodore, who contracted tuberculosis. George brought Theodore to Los Angeles, California, to be treated, but he was denied entry to a sanatorium because he was Black and died on January 5, 1917.

His collections of poetry and prose were generally published privately or self-published, although he also published in periodicals. In total, 67 poems by McClellan are known.

Many know McClellan for his poetry, many don't know that he wrote fictional prose and literally criticism. All of McClellan's fictional prose other than one piece talks about how life was in rural Alabama. A singular piece entails stories about colored women. One the flip side his literary criticism reveals and expresses emotional depth. Along with his writing, he also served as a congregational minister from 1892 to 1894. The ministry was during the middle of his writing career, initially his career first started with his most known type of writing, his composed poetry in the 1880s. He also worked on his prose during that time. His first published poems were released in 1895. Along with his writing he worked as a chaplain and a teacher at the State Normal School for colored persons located in Alabama. He continued to write throughout his years, he published twelve poems under the title "Songs of a Southerner" in 1896. Years later he wrote and published one of his most popular pieces about an interracial marriage. This story was called "Old Greenbottom Inn", it preaches that interracial love is normal and natural. Which at the time of publish in 1906 was very against the cultural norm and even banned in some if not most states.

== Reception ==
Critic Dickson D. Bruce Jr., who considers McClellan's poetry conservative and sentimentalist, notes that it generally treats common themes of the time such as "nature, love, or religion". According to the literary scholar Joan R. Sherman, McClellan's poems illustrate the poetic narrator's "struggle to deal with his 'double consciousness'". In other work, Sherman notes that McClellan "suffered keenly" from double consciousness as a "black artist" who was "highly intelligent, sensitive, ambitious, and race-proud". She describes his work as skillful and measured, while arguing that it evokes "spiritual" dissonance. Sterling Allen Brown "largely dismissed" McClellan's work, viewing it as "the same-old romantic escapism of much of African-American literature".

== Personal life ==
McClellan married Mariah Augusta Rabb on October 3, 1888. They were probably separated by the 1920s, when McClellan lived in Los Angeles. He died on May 17, 1934, in New York City, and was buried in Louisville.

George Marion McClellan Had two sons, Lochiel and Theodore. Lochiel was born in 1892, and Theodore in 1895. Theodore died due to untreated tuberculosis.

== Publications ==
- Poems and Storiettes (self-published in Nashville, Tennessee, 1895)
- Songs of a Southerner (Boston: Rockwell and Churchell, 1896)
- Old Greenbottom Inn and Other Stories (self-published in Louisville, 1906)
- The Path of Dreams (Louisville: Morton, 1916)
- The Feet Of Judas

== Sources ==
- Gloster, Hugh M. (1965). Negro Voices in American Fiction. Russell & Russell. OCLC 1256526064.
- Schmidt, Peter (June 17, 2010). Sitting in Darkness: New South Fiction, Education, and the Rise of Jim Crow Colonialism, 1865–1920. University Press of Mississippi. ISBN 978-1-60473-311-2.
- Sherman, Joan R. (1989). Invisible Poets: Afro-Americans of the Nineteenth Century (2d ed.). University of Illinois Press. ISBN 0-252-01620-3. OCLC 18322888.
