= Joseph Seamon Cotter Sr. =

American poet

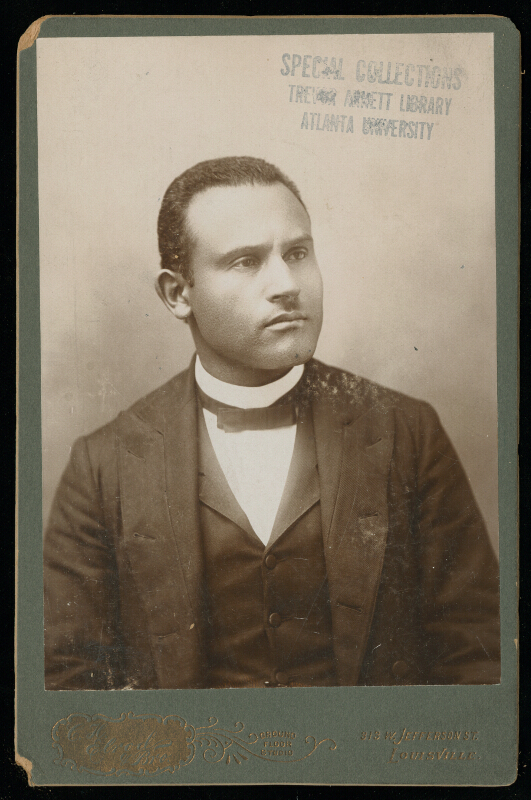
- Cabinet card of Cotter
- Born: Joseph Seamon Cotter Sr. February 2, 1861; Nelson County, Kentucky, U.S.
- Died: March 14, 1949 (aged 88); Louisville, Kentucky, U.S.
- Occupations: Writer; poet; playwright; community leader
- Spouse: Maria F. Cox
- Children: 4, including Joseph Seamon Cotter Jr.

Joseph Seamon Cotter Sr. (February 2, 1861 – March 14, 1949) was an American poet, writer, playwright, and community leader raised in Louisville, Kentucky (but born in Nelson County, Kentucky). Cotter was one of the earliest African-American playwrights to be published. He was known as "Kentucky's first Negro poet with real creative ability." Cotter was born at the start of the American Civil War, and was raised in poverty with no formal education until the age of 22. He later became an educator and an advocate of black education.

== Personal life ==
Cotter grew up in a family of mixed racial heritage. His father, Michael J. Cotter, was a white man of Scots-Irish ancestry, and his mother, Martha Vaughn, was a freeborn black woman of mixed heritage (one of several children born to an African slave mother and an English-Cherokee father).

On July 22, 1891, Cotter married Maria F. Cox, a fellow teacher, with whom he had four children: Leonidas, Florence, Olivia, and Joseph Seamon Cotter Jr. (a distinguished poet-playwright in his own merit).

== Education ==
After completing the third grade, Cotter dropped out to help support his family. Cotter worked in manual labor and various odd jobs until the age of 22, where he joined the first and newly created Louisville night school for black students. Cotter attended night school for ten months, earning his high school diploma and teaching credentials. One of his teachers was Rev. Alexander Walters, who had a large influence on him.

According to Metzger (1989): "There is little specific information about either the extent of Cotter's education—it seems certain that he never attended college or completed a degree-granting program—or his professional life as an educator. Although some writers had felt that Cotter must have attended college, his love of writing and of literature might just have well stemmed from the many books that his mother had read to him as a child. And although Cotter's contributions to black education are now seen as extremely important, at the time he was working, few details of such work were preserved for later study. What is now certain is that Cotter became a respected writer, although when he first began to write is not clear."

== Career in education ==
Once becoming qualified to teach, Cotter got his first job in the Cloverport Public School system. The conditions at Cloverport were extremely poor. Cotter made the best of teaching children in a small one-roomed school house with dirt flooring and no heating. This marked the start of Cotter's long dedication to the education of black children and a commitment to his community. After two years teaching at Cloverport, Cotter taught at a nearby private school before moving to the Louisville Public School system two years later. His first job within the Louisville Public School system was at Western Colored School, which was located in an all-black neighborhood. Here Cotter would teach for the next four years, from 1889 to 1893. Attesting to his belief in black education, in 1893 Cotter founded the Paul Laurence Dunbar School, named after the poet and friend Paul Laurence Dunbar. Cotter served as principal of this black high school until 1911, whereupon he took the position of principal at Samuel Coleridge-Taylor School and held the post until 1942.

Along with his 53-year career as an educator, Cotter worked for racial advancement with many local and national organizations, including Louisville Colored Orphans Home Society, Kentucky Educational Association, Author's League, Association for the Study of Negro Life and History, and NAACP.

== Literary contributions ==
Cotter's literary contributions include nine published works. Among these works are 4 volumes of poetry: A Rhyming (1895); Links of Friendship (1898); A White Song and a Black One (1909); and Collected Poems (1938). Cotter's other publications include: Sequel to "The Pied Piper of Hamelin," and Other Poems (1939), a collection of poetry and prose; Negroes and Others at Work and Play (1947); Caleb, the Degenerate; A Play in Four Acts: A Study of the Types, Customs, and Needs of the American Negro (1903); and 2 collections of prose, Negro Tales (1912), and Twenty-fifth Anniversary of the Founding of Colored Parkland or "Little Africa," Louisville, Ky., 1891–1916 (1934).

Cotter also often contributed to periodicals such as the Louisville Courier-Journal (from 1884), National Baptist Magazine (1894–1908), Voice of the Negro (1904–07), Southern Teachers Advocate (Kentucky; 1905–06), and Alexander's Magazine (1909).

According to William S. Ward, "…[Cotter's] writings have never won him high recognition, but he has fared rather well at the hands of black historians." Cotter's writing is known to utilize both dialect and standard English to advocate race advancement, "to be gained by a mixture of race pride, humility, hard work, education, and a positive, optimistic outlook." Historian Joan R. Sherman also notes that a common theme seen in Cotter's writing, from his earliest poems to The Negro's Ten Commandments (1947), is that "he consistently advocated this gospel:

(5) Read not thyself out of toiling with the hands, and toil not thyself out of reading; for reading makes one akin to the ox. Therefore he who simply dreams is dying, and he who dreams not is already dead.
(7) Learn thou the worth of a dollar and how to keep it from damning thee.
(9) Socially thou shalt go no nearer thy brother than he comes to thee. Aversion in him should slay the thought of advance in thee.
(10) If thou hast a mind to live by being honest, industrious, frugal and self-sacrificing, remain in the South where thou shalt surely reap thy character's worth; but if thou hast a mind to die through sloth, ignorance and folly, get thee far from it, for the burden of burying such is becoming intolerable."

== Bibliography ==
- Cotter, Joseph S. A Rhyming. Louisville, Ky.: New South Publishing, Co., 1895. 32 pp. Copy: DLC
- Cotter, Joseph S. Links of Friendship. Louisville, Ky.: Bradley & Gilbert Co., 1898. 64 pp. 54 poems. Portrait. Copies: DHU, DLC, NN, NNSch.
- Cotter, Joseph S. Caleb, the Degenerate; A Play in Four Acts: A Study of the Types, Customs, and Needs of the American Negro. Louisville, Ky.: Bradley & Gilbert Co., 1903. 57 pp. Portrait. *Copies: DHU, DLC, NN, NNSch copy inscribed by Cotter to the Rev. Edward Everett Hale.
- Cotter, Joseph S. Negro Tales. New York: Cosmopolitan Press, 1912. 148 pp. 17 tales. Copies: DHU, NNsch.
- Cotter, Joseph S. A White Song and a Black One. Louisville, Ky.: Bradley & Gilbert Co., 1909. 64 pp. 48 poems. Copies: DHU, DLC, NN, NNSch copy inscribed: "With compliments of Joseph S. Cotter."
- Cotter, Joseph S. Twenty-fifth Anniversary of the Founding of Colored Parkland or "Little Africa" Louisville, Ky., 1801–1916. 1934. Louisville, Ky.: I. Willis Cole Publishing Co., 1934. Copy: DHU.
- Cotter, Joseph S. Collected Poems. New York: Henry Harrison, 1938. 78 pp. 73 poems. Portrait. Copies: DHU, DLC, NN, NNSch
- Cotter, Joseph S. Sequel to "The Pied Piper of Hamelin," and Other Poems. New York: Henry Harrison, 1939. 93 pp. 69 poems. Copies: DHU, DLC, NN, NNSch. Copies: DHU, DLC, NN, NNSch
- Cotter, Joseph S. Negroes and Others at Work and Play. New York: Paebar Co., 1947. 63 pp. 7 poems, aphorisms, tales, sketches, plays, songs.
