= Negro Poets and Their Poems =

1923 poetry anthology

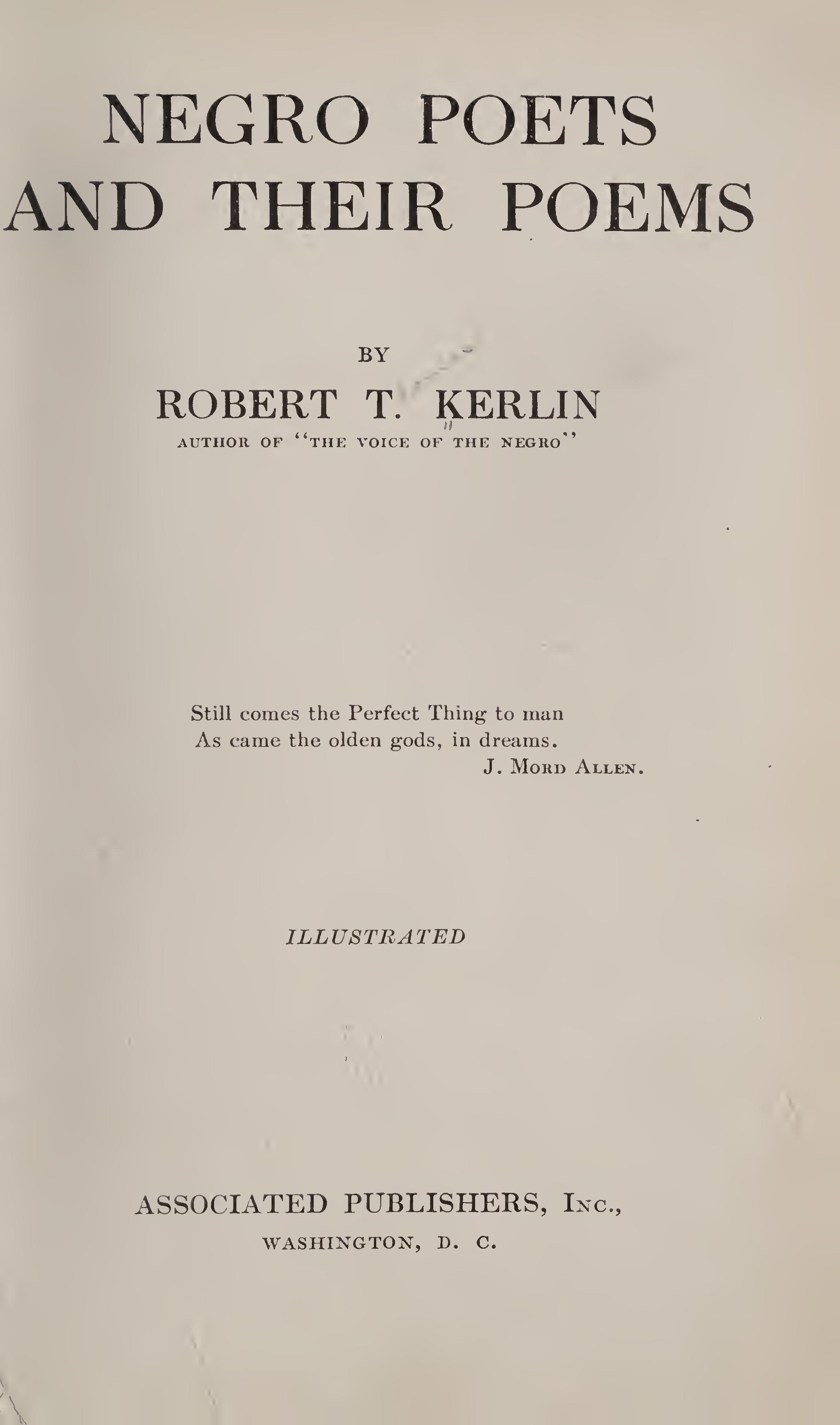
- Editor: Robert T. Kerlin
- Subject: African American poetry
- Published: 1923
- Publisher: The Associated Publishers
- Media type: Poetry anthology
- Pages: 309
- Text: Negro Poets and Their Poems at Wikisource

Negro Poets and Their Poems is a 1923 poetry collection by Robert T. Kerlin. It was one of the major anthologies of African American poetry published during the Harlem Renaissance and has been cited as a valuable source of information on the era.

== Background ==
The Harlem Renaissance was an intellectual and cultural revival of African American life centered in Harlem, Manhattan, New York City, spanning the 1920s and 1930s. A major aspect of this revival was poetry. Hundreds of poems were written and published by African Americans during the era, which covered a wide variety of themes. The Poetry Foundation wrote that poets in the Harlem Renaissance "explored the beauty and pain of black life and sought to define themselves and their community outside of white stereotypes." Poets such as Langston Hughes, James Weldon Johnson, and Countee Cullen became well known for their poetry, which was often inspired by jazz.

The poetry of the era was published in several different ways, notably in the form of anthologies. The Book of American Negro Poetry (1922), Negro Poets and Their Poems (1923), An Anthology of Verse by American Negroes (1924), and Caroling Dusk (1927) have been cited as four major poetry anthologies of the Harlem Renaissance.

== Publication ==
Robert T. Kerlin, an American educator and minister, intended for his anthology to be a "defense of black people." The work, which was first published in 1923 by The Associated Publishers, began its 309 pages with an essay about the works. It was dedicated to "Black and Unknown Bards" and in compiling it Kerlin sought high quality poetry but also "at least one fundamental quality of poetry, namely, passion." Negro Poets and Their Poems also includes biographical information about and some photographs of the poets whose work is included. In 1986, the scholar Vilma R. Potter noted that Kerlin's compilation had been shaped by his "moral enthusiasm".

== Reception ==
Eric Walrond in The New Republic received the book generally favorably, proposing that it be used in schools by the Commission on Interracial Cooperation. A reviewer in The Journal of Negro History described the anthology as a valuable source of information. In the Hartford Courant a reviewer described the book as "an extremely interesting and really valuable book" but felt that the poetry itself was "exceedingly varied, and most uneven in quality". A contemporary reviewer in The Evening Star felt that the book was "revealing" and felt that "the anthology includes true poetry," concluding that it was "a book for upstanding pride, without a note of apology anywhere about it."
