= James D. Corrothers =

African American poet and minister

James David Corrothers
- James D. Corrothers circa 1910
- Born: July 2, 1869; Cass County, Michigan, US
- Died: February 12, 1917 (aged 47); West Chester, Pennsylvania, US
- Education: Northwestern University
- Occupations: Poet; journalist; minister
- Writing career
- Language: English

James David Corrothers (July 2, 1869 – February 12, 1917) was an African-American poet, journalist, and minister whom editor Timothy Thomas Fortune called "the coming poet of the race." When Corrothers died, W. E. B. Du Bois eulogized him as "a serious loss to the race and to literature."

== Life and career ==
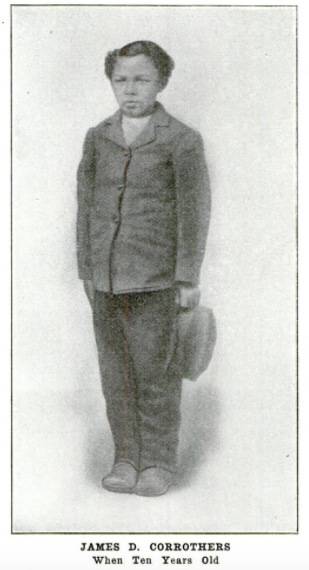

Corrothers was born in Cass County, Michigan, and grew up in a small town of anti-slavery activists who settled before the war. He attended Northwestern University in Chicago and Bennett College in Greensboro, North Carolina, but left to work as a newspaper reporter. He met Frederick Douglass at the 1893 World Columbian Exposition.

Corrothers gained early fame with his volume of poetry in "Negro dialect" but later expressed his regret about the volume. He believed that poetry in "standard English" was more appropriate for the twentieth century.

Corrothers shared a long friendship with his contemporary Paul Laurence Dunbar and, after Dunbar's death, memorialized him with the poem "Paul Laurence Dunbar," published in Century Magazine (1912). In his autobiography, In Spite of the Handicap, Corrothers claimed credit for bringing Dunbar's work to the attention of William Dean Howells.

Corrothers worked as a minister after 1898, serving African Methodist Episcopal, Baptist, and Presbyterian congregations. He died of a stroke in West Chester, Pennsylvania, two years after his ministry brought him to a parish there.

In 1922, James Weldon Johnson published seven poems by Corrothers in the anthology The Book of American Negro Poetry (1922).

== Works ==
- The Snapping of the Bow, 1901
- The Black Cat Club, 1902
- At the Closed Gate of Justice, 1913
- In Spite of the Handicap, 1916
