= Ariel Williams Holloway =

American writer

- Lucy Ariel Williams, from a 1926 publication
- Born: March 3, 1905; Mobile, Alabama, U.S.
- Died: January 3, 1973 (aged 67); Plainfield, New Jersey, U.S.
- Other names: Lucy Ariel Williams, Lucy Ariel Williams Holloway
- Occupations: Poet; musician; educator
- Spouse: Joaquin M. Holloway

Ariel Williams Holloway (March 3, 1905 –January 3, 1973) was an African-American poet of the Harlem Renaissance.

== Early life and education ==
Holloway was born Lucy Ariel Williams in Mobile, Alabama. Her mother was Fannie Brandon, a teacher and choir singer, and her father was Dr. H. Roger Williams, a physician and pharmacist. She studied at Emerson Institute, Mobile and graduated from Talladega College in 1922. She earned a B.A. in Music at Fisk University in Nashville, Tennessee (1926), after which she went on to the Oberlin Conservatory of Music, from which she received another B.A. in Music with a major in piano and a minor in voice (1928). During the summers, Williams continued her musical studies with bandleader Fred Waring and at Columbia University.

In 1936 she married Joaquin M. Holloway, a postal worker, with whom she had a son, Joaquin Jr., the following year. She preferred not to use her first name and was known professionally first as Ariel Williams and later as Ariel Williams Holloway.

== Career ==
Williams's ambition was to be a concert pianist but lack of opportunities drove her into teaching music. She began her teaching career as director of music at North Carolina College for Negroes in Durham (1926–32) and subsequently taught at Dunbar High School in Mobile (1932–1936), at Fessenden Academy in Florida (1936–1937), and at Lincoln Academy in Kings Mountain, North Carolina (1938–39). In 1939, Williams became the first supervisor of music in the Mobile public school system, a job she held until her death in 1973. Ariel Williams Holloway Elementary School in Mobile was named in her honor.

Between 1926 and 1935, Williams published five poems in Opportunity, one of the leading journals of the Harlem Renaissance, and other poems in Crisis: A Record of the Darker Races. She also published a single volume of verse, Shape Them into Dreams (Exposition Press, 1955). "Northboun'," a short poem in dialect about the Great Migration, has been called her "signature poem" and "one of the best poems of the period." Its haunting refrain underlines one of the major continuing divides in American culture:

O' de wurl' ain't flat,
An' de wurl' ain't roun',
H'it's one long strip
Hangin' up an' down—
Jes' Souf an' Norf;
Jes' Norf an' Souf.
—from Ariel Williams Holloway, "Northboun'"

"Northboun'" won an important prize in Opportunity (where it was first published in 1926) and has been collected in several anthologies, including Golden Slippers (1941), edited by Harlem Renaissance poets Countee Cullen and Arna Bontemps, and Lorraine E. Roses and Ruth E. Randolph's Harlem's Glory: Black Women Writing, 1900-1950 (Harvard University Press, 1996).
