= George Reginald Margetson =

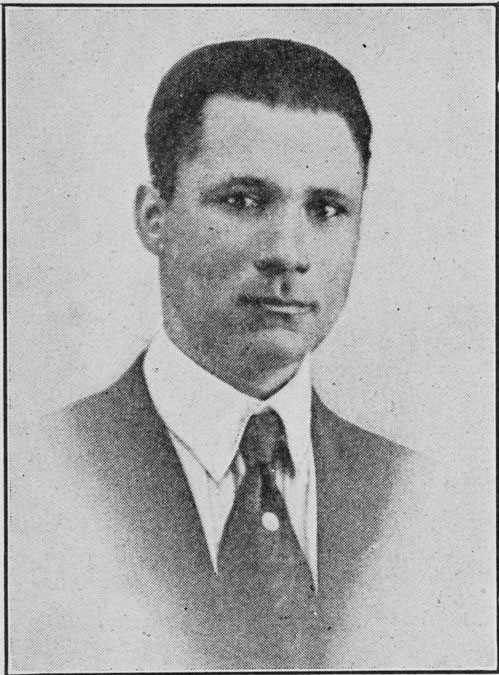
George Reginald Margetson (c.1923)

George Reginald Margetson (1877 - c.1952) was a stationary engineer and poet. He was born in St. Kitts, British West Indies. He moved to the United States in 1897 and resided in Boston.

He graduated from Bethel Moravian School in 1895. He married Elizabeth Matthews and had "a large family." He lived in Cambridge, Massachusetts.

His book Fledging Bard and the Poetry Society is a single poem covering 100 pages. His work includes satire.

He died around 1952.

== Publishings ==
- England in the West Indies; a neglected and degenerating empire Cambridge, Massachusetts (1906)
- Ethiopia’s Flight: The Negro Question; Or, The White Man’s Fear (1907)
- Songs of Life collection (Sherman, French & Company, 1910)
- The Call to Duty (1910)
- The fledgling bard and the poetry society Richard G. Badger, Boston, Copp Clark, Toronto (c. 1916)
- Songs of life Sherman, French & Company, Boaton (1910)
