= Joseph Seamon Cotter Jr. =

American writer

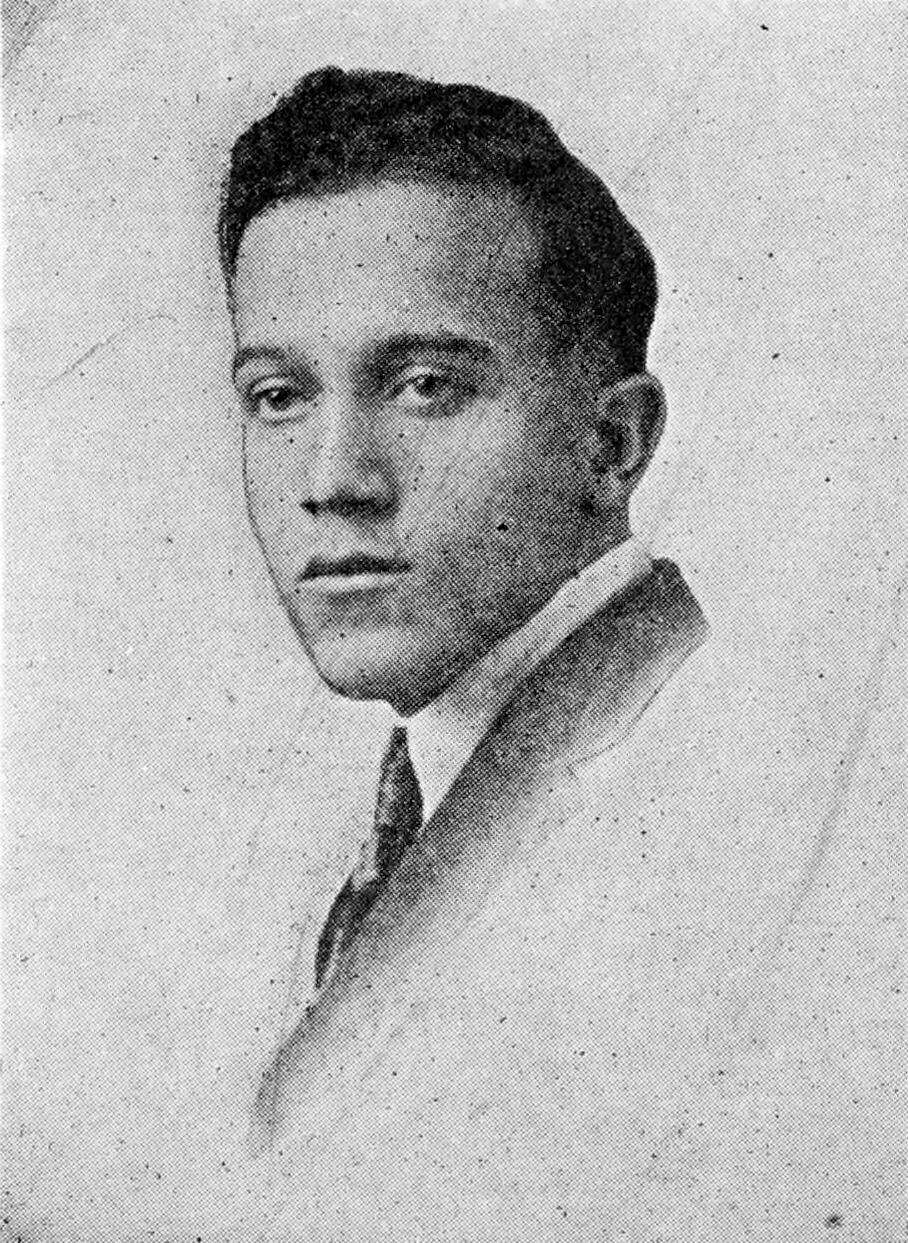
- Photograph of Cotter from the 1923 book Negro Poets and Their Poems
- Born: Joseph Seamon Cotter Jr. September 2, 1895; Louisville, Kentucky, U.S.
- Died: February 3, 1919 (aged 23); Louisville, Kentucky, U.S.
- Education: Central High School
- Occupations: Playwright; writer; poet
- Parent: Joseph Seamon Cotter Sr. (father)

Joseph Seamon Cotter Jr. (September 2, 1895 – February 3, 1919) was an American poet, playwright, and journalist from Louisville, Kentucky. He is most remembered for his posthumous one-act play On the Fields of France and his sole published poetry collection The Band of Gideon and Other Lyrics (1918). Cotter wrote during a period of intense racial tension surrounding World War I, and engaged themes of racial identity, wartime sacrifice, and personal grief within his writing, while also experimenting with free verse and rhythmic forms preceding stylistic innovations of the Harlem Renaissance. Cotter is often described as a forerunner of the Harlem Renaissance, despite his untimely death at age twenty-three due to tuberculosis. At the time of his death, Cotter left behind a body of sixty-five known poems and a single play that some scholars have argue demonstrates the potential to be among other leading voices in his generation.

== Early life and education ==
Cotter was born on September 2, 1895, in Louisville, Kentucky, to Joseph Seamon Cotter Sr., a notable African American educator, poet, and playwright who also served as the principal of Louisville's Central Colored High School, and Martha Cotter. Cotter grew up in a household immersed in literature, and was taught to read as a toddler by his older sister, Florence Olivia Cotter. Cotter Jr's exposure to the literary world was also amplified by his father's importance in Louisville's African American community. Cotter Jr's father was a widely published poet and storyteller, and built the foundation of his literary voice.

Cotter graduated from Central Colored High School in 1911, where his father served as principal. Following high school, Cotter enrolled at Fisk University in Nashville, Tennessee, where he contributed to the university's literary magazine, Fisk Herald, helping develop his craft as a writer among other African American intellectuals. However, during Cotter's sophomore year, he was diagnosed with tuberculosis; the disease that would ultimately end his brief career, and was forced to withdraw from the university and return to Louisville.

== Career ==
=== Journalism and early writing ===
After returning to Louisville, Cotter took up work as an editor at the Louisville Leader, an African American newspaper, even as his health continued to decline. Despite his condition, Cotter kept producing poetry, essays, and dramatic works. Instead of using his father's dialect and narrative style, Cotter experimented with free verse and rhythmic styles that departed significantly from that of earlier African American poetry. Scholars have noted that Cotter may have taken inspiration from the English Romantic poet John Keats in his own works, which are evident in many of his works.

The death of his sister Florence from tuberculosis in 1914 was a devastating blow to Cotter that is seen in his literary output. After her death, Cotter wrote the elegy “To Florence,” which is regarded as one of his most moving works, and a work that exemplifies Cotter's ability to turn his personal grief into resonating pieces of art.

=== The Band of Gideon and war poetry ===
In 1918, The Cornhill Company of Boston published Cotter's only lifetime collection, The Band of Gideon and Other Lyrics, containing twenty-five poems. The volume covered a wide thematic range, moving from topics such as war, nature, love, and racial conditions. The collection drew praise from critic Robert T. Kerlin, who noted its "haunting power" and "African stamp," in his 1923 anthology Negro Poets and Their Poems, as well as its similarity to African American spirituals and the ballads of Christina Rossetti. Kerlin called Cotter the "Negro Lycidas" (a reference to John Milton's elegy about a promising talent who died young), and placed Cotter alongside early voices of the Harlem Renaissance such as Claude McKay, James Weldon Johnson, and Langston Hughes.

World War I played a central role in Cotter's later poetry. Poems like "Sonnet to Negro Soldiers" and "O, Little David, Play on Your Harp" addressed the hypocrisy Black soldiers faced; fighting for democracy abroad while being denied full access to democracy home. In "O, Little David, Play on Your Harp," Cotter used the structure of African American spirituals to address acts of violence around the world; including the Armenian Genocide, Russian pogroms against Jews, German occupation of Belgium, and the widespread mistreatment of Black people as a whole, connecting them all through the phrase "their only crime." Connie Ruzich, a Fulbright Scholar and English professor at Robert Morris University, has argued that Cotter's protest was intentionally indirect, given Cotter's poem was published at a time where racial dissent by African Americans could provoke violent backlash. Ruzich has also highlighted how Cotter embedded his criticism of racial injustice within patriotic and religious frameworks, creating undertones that careful readers could recognize.

=== Posthumous publications ===
As Cotter's health declined, his father acted as his amanuensis, writing down poems that Cotter dictated from his sickbed during his final months. He died on February 3, 1919, at age twenty-three. His father then worked to keep his son's literary legacy alive, arranging for additional works to be published after his death. The one-act play On the Fields of France, considered a notable piece of African American World War I literature, was published in the NAACP's Crisis magazine in 1920. A sequence of nineteen love sonnets called "Out of the Shadows," along with fourteen other poems, appeared in the A.M.E. Zion Quarterly Review between 1920 and 1921. Seven more poems were later discovered among the Cotter family papers at the Western Branch of the Louisville Free Public Library, bringing his total known poems to sixty-five.

== Literary styles and influences ==
Cotter's poetry stands out for its range of forms and tones. While his father wrote mainly in the dialect tradition associated with Paul Laurence Dunbar, the younger Cotter moved away from that style, writing in standard English and working in free verse, sonnets, and lyric forms influenced by the English Romantics, especially John Keats. His strongest individual poems, identified by scholars as "Rain Music" and "O, Little David, Play on Your Harp", combine musicality, vivid compressed imagery, and social commentary. The love sonnets of "Out of the Shadows" reveal a more personal and reflective voice, while his war poems show an engagement with world events unusual for a poet his age. Ball and other critics have viewed Cotter as a proto-Harlem Renaissance figure whose experimentation with form and focus on racial identity helped lay the groundwork for writers of the 1920s. Payne has suggested that if Cotter had lived into that decade, he would likely have found artistic kinship with Langston Hughes, Countee Cullen, and Claude McKay.

== Legacy and rediscovery ==
After his death, Cotter's work appeared in several major anthologies of African American poetry, including James Weldon Johnson's The Book of American Negro Poetry (1922), Countee Cullen's Caroling Dusk (1927), and Langston Hughes and Arna Bontemps's The Poetry of the Negro (1949). During the 1960s and 1970s, though, he was largely left out of the major scholarly anthologies of the time. Julian Mason highlighted this neglect at the 1990 American Literature Association conference, noting that an audience that included Black literary scholars was mostly unfamiliar with the poet.

Scholarly interest grew significantly with James Robert Payne's 1990 edited volume Joseph Seamon Cotter, Jr.: Complete Poems, published by the University of Georgia Press. It was the first edition to bring together all three bodies of Cotter's poetry; the published Band of Gideon poems, the posthumous A.M.E. Zion Quarterly Review poems, and previously unpublished pieces from the family papers; along with a critical introduction situating the poet within the broader history of African American literature. In his review of the volume, Mason wrote that while Cotter "was not great, but he could be good," his best poems deserved serious critical attention.

The Cotter Papers, containing the personal and professional records of both father and son, are held at the Western Branch of the Louisville Free Public Library and have been partly digitized through the Kentucky Digital Library. The collection includes handwritten and typed manuscripts, correspondence, biographical notes written by Cotter Sr. about his son, and a memorial letter from Lucien V. Rule that enclosed an original poem titled "Requiem," written after learning of the younger Cotter's death.
