= Robert T. Kerlin =

American educator and activist

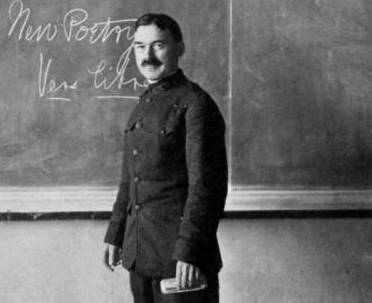
- Kerlin in 1918 at the Virginia Military Institute
- Born: March 22, 1866; Newcastle, Missouri, US
- Died: February 21, 1950 (aged 83); Cumberland, Maryland, US
- Known for: Civil rights activism, socialist activism, English teaching

Robert Thomas Kerlin (March 22, 1866 – February 21, 1950) was an American educator, minister, and civil rights activist. He authored several books and edited the 1920 anthology The Voice of the Negro and the 1923 poetry anthology Negro Poets and Their Poems. Kerlin taught English at several schools, and was fired from three in a row for his activism.

== Early and personal life ==
Robert Thomas Kerlin was born on March 22, 1866, to John Lindsay Kerlin and Nancy Jeffries Kerlin in Newcastle, Missouri. His parents had owned one slave. Kerlin first received higher education at Central College in Missouri. He then attended Johns Hopkins University, the University of Chicago, and Harvard University before graduating from Yale University with a PhD. Kerlin spent some time out of the country. He was a Quaker. On July 10, 1907, Kerlin married Adeline Koster Kerlin. They had three daughters.

== Career ==
For four years, beginning in 1890, Kerlin taught English at Missouri Valley College. He left the college to join the Methodist Episcopal Church, South, as a minister. Kerlin worked there until 1898, when he became involved in the Spanish–American War in 1898 as a chaplain, accompanying the Third Missouri Volunteers. When the war ended he returned to teaching English.

Kerlin worked at a number of schools in the decade that followed: Missouri Valley College (1901–1902), Southwestern University (1902–1903), State Normal School at Warrensburg, Missouri (1903–1906), Yale University (1906–1907, as an instructor), and State Normal School at Farmville (1908–1910). From 1906 to 1907 he was an associate editor of The Arena.

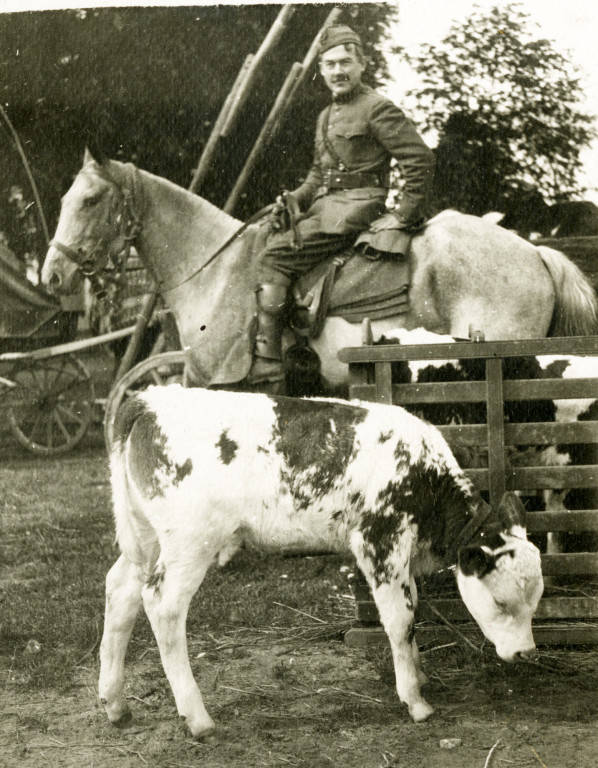
Kerlin in Verdun, France

Kerlin was also a member of the NAACP. In 1910 he was hired to teach English at the Virginia Military Institute. While teaching there, he published The Voice of the Negro, an anthology of writings from African-American newspapers centering around the Red Summer. When World War I ended Kerlin taught at the American Expeditionary Forces University. He edited the 1923 poetry anthology Negro Poets and Their Poems.

In 1921, Kerlin wrote an open letter to Thomas C. McRae, the Governor of Arkansas, requesting that he review the cases of several black farmers who had been sentenced to death following the Elaine massacre. The farmers had been convicted of instigating the riot, but Kerlin argued they had acted in self-defense under attack. He wrote that "The time will come when the world with full knowledge of this will be revolted by such Congo barbarity." After the letter was written and published in The Nation, the Board of Visitors of Virginia Military Institute asked for his resignation. He refused, and the school fired him.

After he was fired from Virginia, Kerlin found employment as a lecturer and at West Chester University in Pennsylvania in 1922. He joined the American Federation of Teachers (CIO) soon after its formation. From 1922 to 1927 he also had brief stints teaching at the Philadelphia Labor College, Lincoln University, and Western Maryland College. Kerlin was fired from his job at West Chester University after five years for "being too friendly with Negroes and for having radical views with respect to the social order." Kerlin wrote in The Reading Times that he was fired for criticizing Calvin Coolidge. He was hired to teach at Potomac State College in West Virginia. He was eventually forced to retire, for similar reasons. In retirement, Kerlin moved to Cumberland, Maryland.

Kerlin edited the CIO's western Maryland news for three years beginning in 1943. He taught at the Cumberland Labor College during World War II, which he had also founded. Kerlin was involved in the formation of Cumberland's chapter of the Progressive Citizens of America, a socialist political group. He also served as its first chairman in September 1947. He left the group the following year after it announced its support for Henry A. Wallace's 1948 campaign for the presidency. That year Kerlin was a nominee of the Socialist Party of America to be a member of the United States Electoral College.

Kerlin picketed movie theaters in Cumberland, protesting segregation of the theaters, particularly when the film Pinky was released in 1949. The Journal of Negro History wrote that "it may be that such exposure at his advanced age was the immediate cause of his death." Kerlin died on February 21, 1950, in Cumberland, Maryland. His death was due to a heart attack.

== Literature ==
- Mainly for Myself (1897)
- The Camp Life of the Third Regiment (1898)
- The Church of the Fathers (1901)
- Theocritus in English Literature (1909)
- Milton's Minor Poems (editor)
- The Voice of the Negro (1920, editor)
- Contemporary Poetry of the Negro (1921, editor)
- Negro Poets and Their Poems (1923, editor)
