= Chicago Black Renaissance =

African-American cultural flowering in 1930s–1940s Illinois

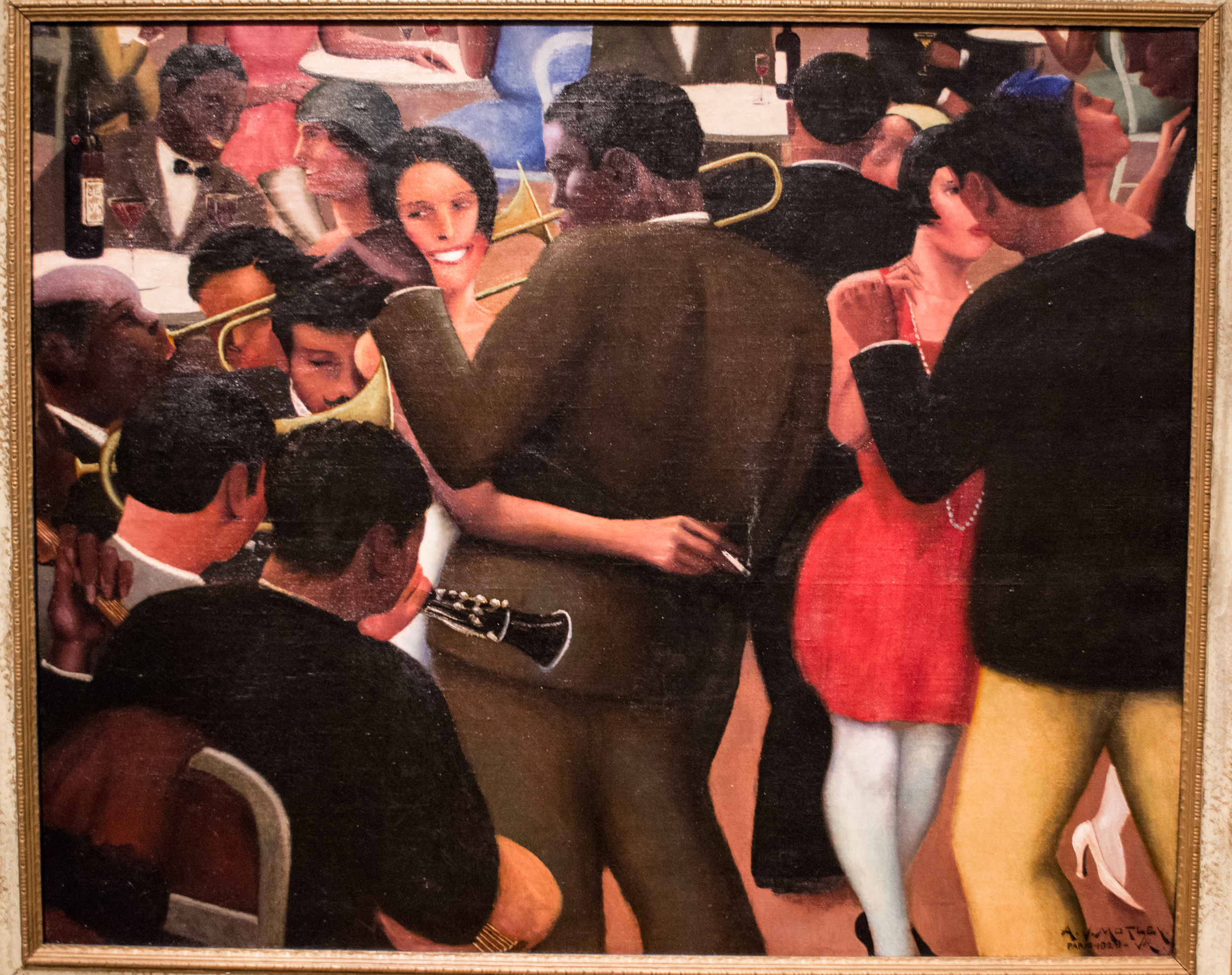
Archibald Motley painting Blues (1929)

The Chicago Black Renaissance (also known as the Black Chicago Renaissance) was a creative movement that blossomed out of the Chicago Black Belt on the city's South Side and spanned the 1930s and 1940s before a transformation in art and culture took place in the mid-1950s through the turn of the century. The movement included such famous African-American writers as Richard Wright, Margaret Walker, Gwendolyn Brooks, Arna Bontemps, and Lorraine Hansberry, as well as musicians Thomas A. Dorsey, Louis Armstrong, Earl Hines and Mahalia Jackson and artists William Edouard Scott, Elizabeth Catlett, Katherine Dunham, Charles White, Margaret Burroughs, Charles C. Dawson, Archibald John Motley, Jr., Walter Sanford, and Eldzier Cortor. During the Great Migration, which brought tens of thousands of African-Americans to Chicago's South Side, African-American writers, artists, and community leaders began promoting racial pride and a new Black consciousness, similar to that of the Harlem Renaissance. In contrast to the Harlem Renaissance, historians regard the Chicago Black Renaissance as more radical, and its prominent figures espoused more leftist socio-economic views - in large part a reflection of the prevalence of industrial labor in Black Chicago. It was also notably more inward-looking, evaluating politics and societal undercurrents within the Black community that Harlem Renaissance artists were less likely to explore due to broader collaboration with white benefactors. Ultimately, the Chicago Black Renaissance did not receive the same amount of publicity as the Harlem Renaissance on a national scale, the primary reasons being that the Chicago group participants presented no singularly prominent "face", wealthy patrons were less involved, and New York City—home of Harlem—was the higher profile national publishing center.

== Development of the African American community in Chicago ==
The Chicago Black Renaissance was influenced by two major social and economic conditions: the Great Migration and the Great Depression. The Great Migration brought tens of thousands of African Americans from the south to Chicago. Between 1910 and 1930 the African American population increased from 44,000 to 230,000. Before this migration, African Americans only constituted 2% of Chicago's population. African American migrants resided in a segregated zone on Chicago's south side, extending from 22nd Street on the north to 63rd Street on the south, and reaching from the Rock Island railroad tracks on the west to Cottage Grove Avenue on the east. This zone of neighborhoods was known as the "Black belt" or "Black ghetto."

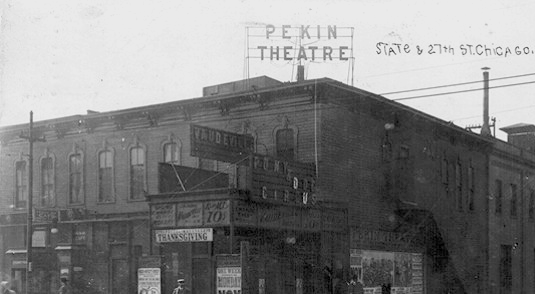
The Pekin Theatre (also called Pekin Inn or Pekin Café), located at 2700 State Street in Chicago, in the 1910–20s, was purported to be the first Chicago Theatre owned and operated by African Americans. Many early jazz artists played there, most notably Joe "King" Oliver.

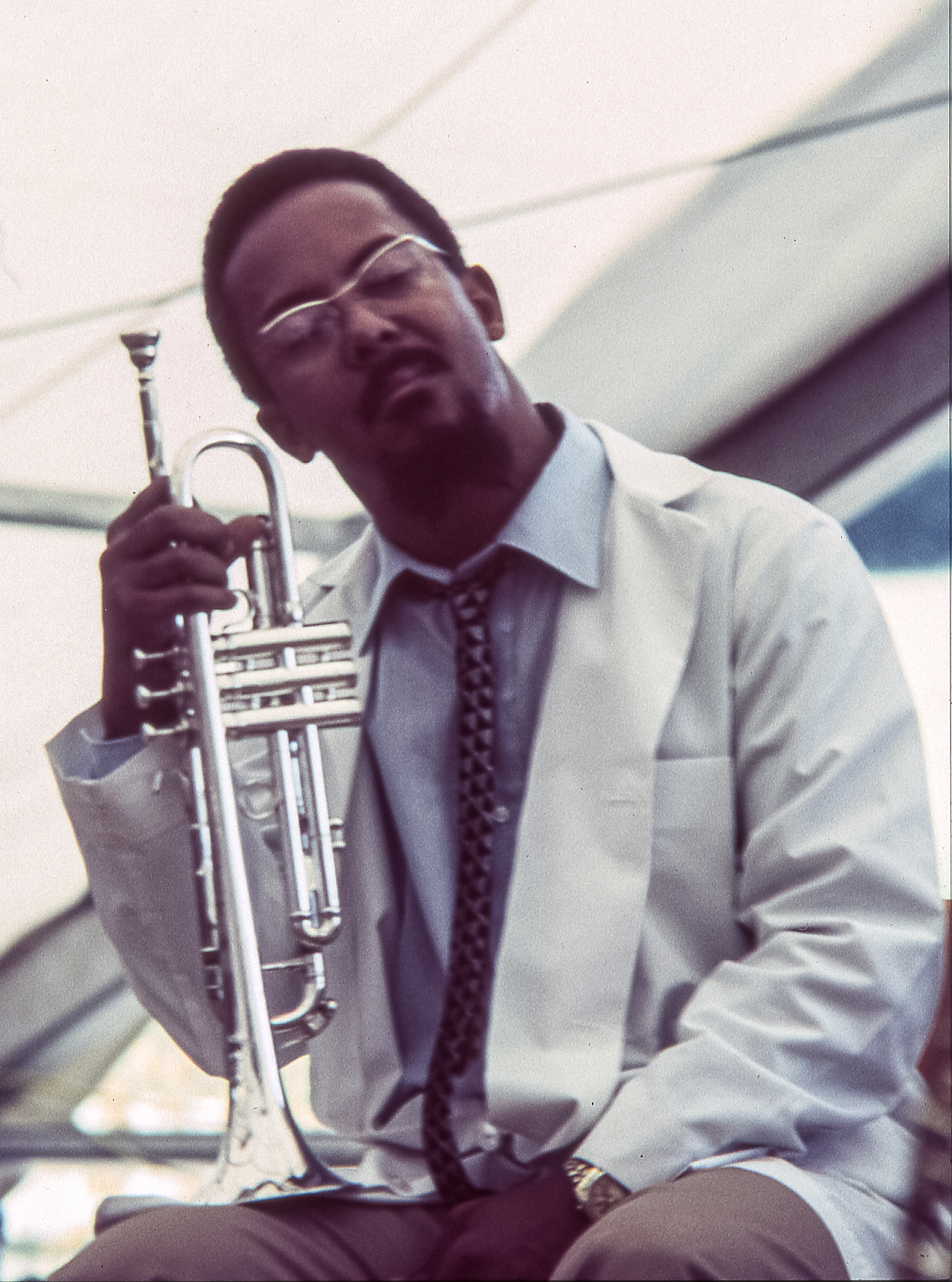
Lester Bowie, with the Art Ensemble of Chicago, Jazz Festival Zeltweg (Spielberg), 1983.

African Americans saw Chicago, and other cities of the north, as a chance for freedom from legally sanctioned racial discrimination. Migrants mainly found work in meatpacking plants, steel mills, garment shops, and private homes. The Great Migration established the foundation of Chicago's African American industrial working class. When the stock market crashed in 1929 and the Great Depression resulted, thousands of people lost their jobs. African Americans were hit particularly hard. This catastrophe allowed for an emergence of new ideas and institutions among the Black community. With a revitalized community spirit and sense of racial pride, a new Black consciousness developed resulting in a shift toward social activism. African Americans on the south side coined the word Bronzeville, a word that described the skin tone of most its inhabitants, to identify their community.

== Music ==
Jazz, blues, and gospel grew and flourished during the Chicago Black Renaissance.

Jazz, which developed as a mix of European and African musical styles, began in the southeastern United States, but is said to have made its way from New Orleans to Chicago in 1915, when migrants came north to work in factories, mills, and stockyards. As more of the population moved north, the sound developed and grew in popularity. In 1922, Louis Armstrong followed his band leader Joe "King" Oliver to Chicago from New Orleans. He showed a unique talent for improvisation and quickly became a jazz sensation. For 30 years, he defined jazz in Chicago. During that time, Chicago heard a number of jazz greats such as Earl "Fatha" Hines, Jelly Roll Morton, Erskine Tate, Fats Waller, and Cab Calloway.

Blues also came to Chicago from the southeast during this period. In contrast to jazz, blues brought a somber tone of life and work in the Mississippi Delta. Towards the end of the Chicago Black Renaissance, Chicago started to change the sound of blues, adding drums, piano, bass, harmonica, and switching the acoustic guitar for electric. The new style was called Chicago Blues. Greats such as Chester Burnett, Willie Dixon, Muddy Waters, and Koko Taylor were prominent during this time.

Gospel, though popular before the Renaissance, saw a resurgence in prominence during this time. The "Father of Gospel Music," Thomas Dorsey, brought hundreds of new gospel songs from the Southern Pentecostal Church to the public by blending the sound with urban style. Mahalia Jackson, the "Queen of Gospel Music," made many of these songs mainstream when she arrived in Chicago in 1927.

Classical composers include Florence Price.

== Literature ==
The writing of the Chicago Black Renaissance addressed the culture of Chicago, racial tensions, issues of identity, and a search for meaning. Prominent writers in the movement included Richard Wright, Margaret Walker, Gwendolyn Brooks, Arna Bontemps, Fenton Johnson, Lorraine Hansberry, and Frank London Brown. The South Side Writers Group was a writing circle of several authors and poets from the time of the Chicago Black Renaissance. Its members worked collaboratively to inspire one another and explore new themes.

Newspapers and periodicals including the Chicago Defender, Chicago Sunday Bee, Negro Story Magazine, and Negro Digest also took part in supporting the literature of the Chicago Black Renaissance. These periodicals offered forums for writers of the movement to publish their work and also provided employment to many of these writers.

Some of the well known literary works that emerged from the Chicago Black Renaissance include Wright's Native Son, Brooks' A Street in Bronzeville, Hansberry's A Raisin in the Sun, St. Clair Drake and Horace R. Cayton's Black Metropolis, and Frank Marshall Davis' Black Man's Verse and 47th Street: Poems.

== Visual arts ==
In addition to musicians and writers, several visual artists emerged during the Chicago Black Renaissance. Painters used different styles from portraiture to abstraction to reveal the thrills and grit of Black life. Photographers also displayed daily life of south side Chicago through a variety of iconic American images.

Four Black artists, all of whom attended the School of the Art Institute of Chicago, are famous for sharing the vibrant spirit of Black Chicago through their art: William Edouard Scott, Charles Wilbert White, Archibald John Motley, Jr., and Eldzier Cortor. Scott painted impressionist landscapes, portraits, and murals depicting Black achievement, while White was a prominent graphic artist and worked with the mural division of the Illinois Federal Art Project. He was an active member of the South Side Community Art Center, which was founded by Margaret Burroughs, and his work, "There Were No Crops This Year," won a first prize at the Negro Exposition in 1940. Motley's paintings, on the other hand, created controversy with his depictions of jazz culture and Black sensuality, providing vivid images of urban Black life in the 1920s and 1930s. Lastly, Cortor became famous for his delineation of the beauty of Black women. In 1946, Life Magazine published one of his seminude female figures.

=== Archibald Motley's early life ===
Archibald Motley

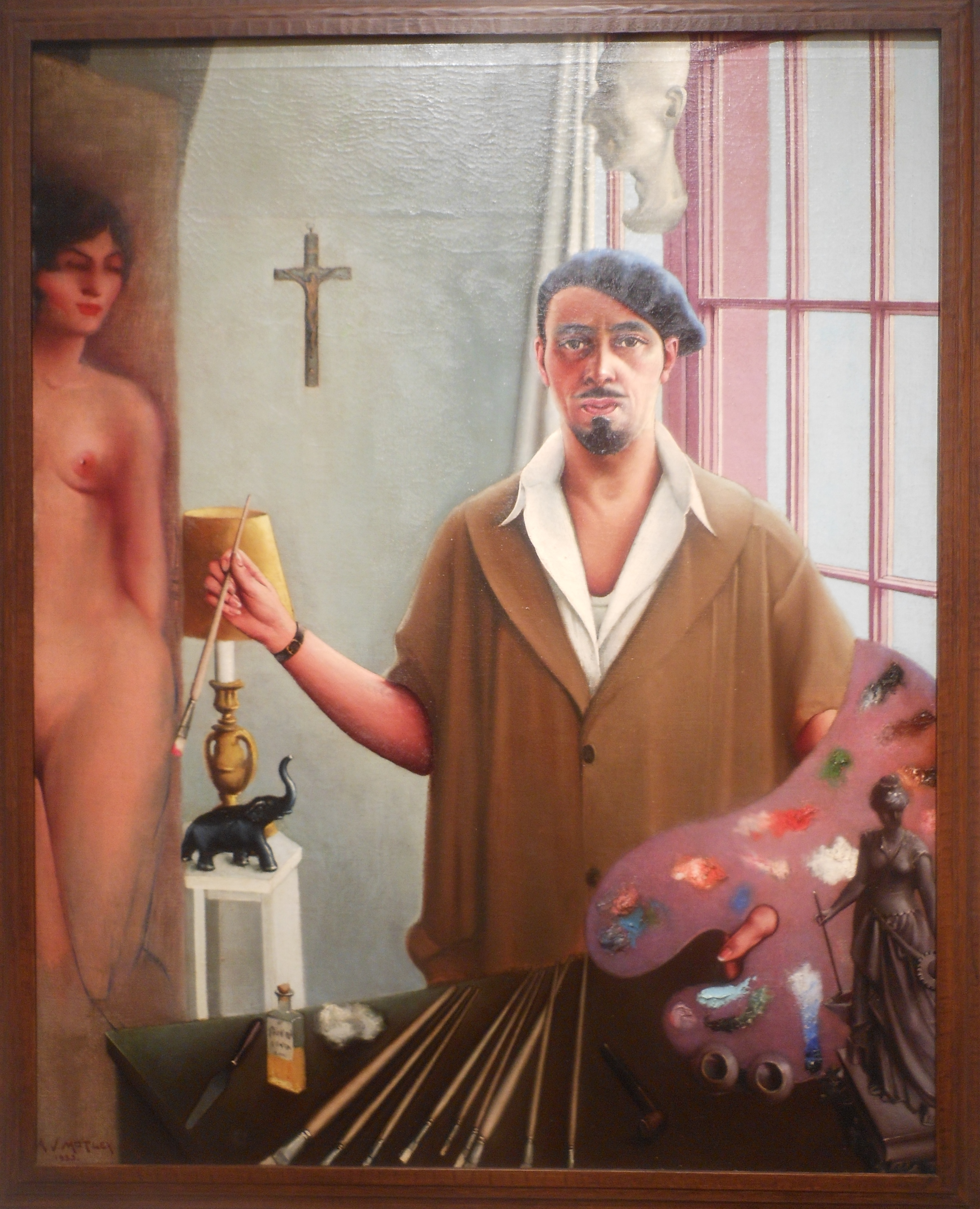
Self Portrait, 1920

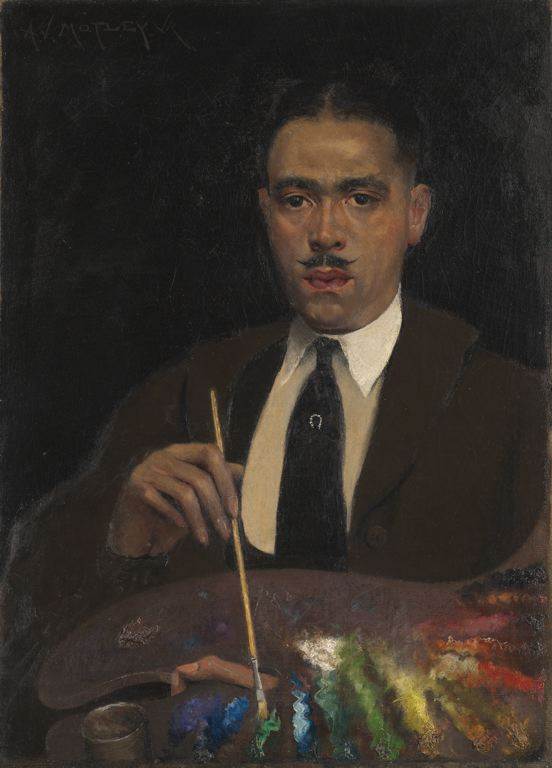
Self-Portrait, 1933

Archibald J. Motley graduated from the Chicago Art Institute in 1918 with a concentration in portraiture. While at the Institute, Motley studied under Karl Buehr. When reflecting on his time and studied spent with Buehr, the artist goes onto say about his mentor that “a great influence on me not only as a painter but as a gentlemen, as a man”. As Motley began his career, he realized that working in portraiture was not very profitable. In one of Motley’s early works, “The Fisherman” it is extremely unexpressive and does not bear much resemblance to Archibald’s later work. The palette Motley uses in this portrait is very muted and realistic. A middle age man is sitting in a chair, looking out to the right, not making eye contact with the viewer. Not only is the subject matter different in Motley’s earlier paintings compared to his later, but as is his style. In his portrait of this fisherman, the brushstrokes are extremely visible and the man is very naturalistic unlike his later paintings where it is very animates and appears to look saturated. It can be seen in this early portrait the influence Buehr had on Motley. The artists focus on light, contours in the face, and texture can be attributed to his mentor. The tools and techniques Motley learned under Buehr can be seen in this early work. Motley graduated from the Art Institute in Chicago with the highest possible grades as well as recognition for “general excellence” in his work. As Motley began to paint and advance in his career, his artwork grew as well and transformed into a style much different than his earlier one.

=== Evolution of Motley's artwork throughout career ===
Motley began his artistic career with portraiture but as his career progressed, he moved into genre paintings. These later paintings depicted the lives of African Americans from areas like “the streets of Bronzeville” which is described as “the assorted African neighborhoods of Chicago’s South Side”. Motley got into the world of portrait painters because it was believed that due to the commercialism moving into art, portraits would always be in demand. Motley ran into trouble when he refused to conform to using his racial identity in his artistic work, “He insisted that the cause of Black art could not be served ‘if all Negro artists painted simply Negro types’; rather ‘give the artist of the Race a chance to express himself in his own, individual way, but let him abide by the principles of true art, as our [white] brethren do.”. Portraiture was thought be a safe space for artists but Motley’s own artistic process forced him outside of this space. The move from portraits to genre scenes came because of Motley’s need to make money from his art. Although his portraits gave the people he painted a voice to express their own story, like “Mending Socks”, 1924, he was able to give a voice to those in the scenes of cabarets, pool halls, and the streets of African American neighborhoods with the added incentive of making money from these scenes.

After spending a year in Paris, the style of modernism moved into his work. Along with his new knowledge of European modernism, he also started to incorporate elements of Impressionism, the colors of Fauvism and Expressionism, and the use of space in Cubism. Motley became more expressive in his works. His use of a vibrant color palette, distorted perspective, and the condensing of space breathed new life into his style of painting. These elements can be seen in Motley’s 1934 painting, “Blackbelt”.

=== Critiques ===
Many people have critiqued both Motley and other artists paintings from the Harlem and Chicago Black Renaissance. One reason is that they believe Motley exaggerated features of African Americans. In “The Liar,” the exaggeration critics comment on are perhaps the lips and how big they are, playing into the stereotypes of how certain people thought of African Americans. Additionally, it is thought that this exaggeration was meant to appeal to a certain audience. This was the white audience who during this time period were the main patrons during the Chicago Black Renaissance. He implemented certain caricature and stereotypes in his paintings to extend to this wider range of artists. By playing into these stereotypes, it could be seen as problematic as he was enforcing stereotypes that had been generalized by the white public. However, on the other hand it was a Black artist painting these elements and in a way could be seen as reclaiming the Black identity.

=== How Motley contributed to Chicago Black Renaissance ===
The Harlem Renaissance is recognized as the movement that originally popularized Black art and gave Black artists a name. Along with the surge of artists in Harlem, the same phenomenon happened in Chicago without the same popularity. This development of art in Chicago came from similar events similar to what happened in Harlem, “the inflow of Black southerners into Chicago; the creation of the WPA’s Federal Art Project (FAP) administered by the Illinois Art Project (IAP); the founding of the South Side Community Art Center (SSCAC); and the artistic production and promotion of Chicago Black arts scene by predominant artists.” One of these artists being Archibald Motley. After thousands of people moved into the areas, communities were built. In these communities, young artists were using the path built by the older generation of artists. Since the younger artists in the city were using artists like Motley, William Scott, and Charles Dawson as inspiration and as role models, the older generation’s work never died. Motley and other’s art became trans-generational.

Chicago was a mecca. There was a period of regrowth, which came from the city wide fire in 1871. The fire gave the city a chance to rebuild, both structurally and culturally. Old vacant buildings were being used as studios for artists and musicians. The creation of Hull House was significant to Chicago’s artistic history because it gave a space for “immigrants and other working-class Chicagoans.” Although Hull House was meant to be a space used for the marginalized, African Americans were still excluded. It was not by definition segregated, but the belief that having Blacks in the studio would deter future members from joining was held among many of the organization’s board members. Due to this exclusion, the homes of elite Black families became galleries and this gave Black Chicagoans a space finally show what they had been creating. Following these in-home galleries, the need for an institution where African American artists could be taught formally was met. The School of the Art Institute of Chicago was one of the few schools that allowed Black attendance. This acceptance drew in even more Black artists into the city and educated well known Black artists, like Motley. Having the Institute in Chicago helped grow the artistic community by drawing artists in and keeping them in the city.

== See also ==
- Black Renaissance in D.C.
- Harlem Renaissance
- South Side Writers Group
