= The Living Is Easy =

1948 novel by American writer Dorothy West

The Living is Easy is a 1948 novel by American writer Dorothy West. Set in 1914, The Living is Easy follows protagonist Cleo Jericho Judson, a mixed-race woman, as she navigates life in an upper-middle-class African-American community in Boston, Massachusetts.

== Background and publication history ==
Much of the novel is thought to be inspired by West's own life as a member of an affluent Black family in Boston. The protagonist, Cleo Jericho Judson, is thought to be based on West's mother, Rachel.

The Living is Easy was first published in 1948 and was republished by the Feminist Press in 1982.

The title of The Living is Easy is a reference to the song "Summertime" from the opera Porgy and Bess by George Gershwin.

== Critical reception ==
Though it met with little commercial success, The Living is Easy received critical acclaim upon its initial publication in 1948. The novel has since become the subject of academic study by scholars such as Trudier Harris, Cherene Sherrard Johnson and Jewelle Gomez. Several scholars have noted that The Living is Easy is unique in its nuanced portrayal of Black womanhood and life in an upper-middle-class African-American community.

Harris wrote that West's writing was limited stylistically, but praised the complexity of the novel's protagonist, Cleo, who "defies any easy categorization".

Cynthia Davis notes that West's works, including The Living is Easy, have been less widely studied than those of her contemporaries because her characters' class and wealth place her novels "outside the black vernacular tradition" of writers such as Ann Petry, Richard Wright, and James Baldwin.
