= Walter Sanford =

American painter

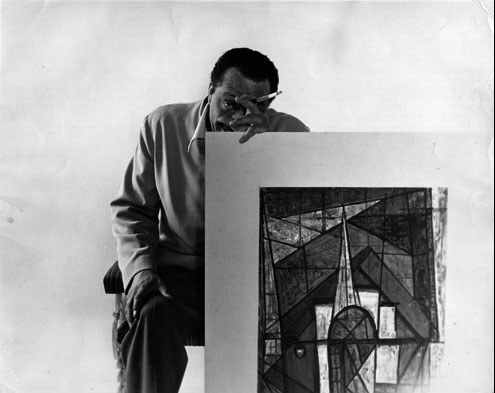
- Born: Walter Sanford; January 30, 1912
- Died: July 3, 1987 (aged 75); Chicago, Illinois
- Education: School of the Art Institute of Chicago and College for Creative Studies (Detroit Society of Arts and Crafts School)
- Known for: painting, drawing; visual art
- Notable work: Black + Tan Fantasy (Duke Ellington); Living Desert; Strange Fruit; A Prolonged Agony of Dissimulation
- Movement: Chicago Black Renaissance

Walter Sanford, also known as Sanford, (30 January 1912 – 3 July 1987), was an American artist who worked in a range of styles and influences using traditional media such as paint, ink, crayon and pencil. His artworks include collages, cartoons, pencil drawings, linoleum-cuts, woodcuts, sculptures, paintings, and portraits. He was one of the first and only black social realism and abstract expressionist artists of the 20th century. He was heralded "Black Picasso" and "Detroit's Picasso" for his cubist figure paintings and in 1958 he won the Prix de Paris La Grande Saison de Paris at the Raymond Duncan Galleries. In Detroit, he opened the first black-owned art gallery and exhibited at the first Negro Art Exhibition and Negro History Week and was hailed as one of Michigan's foremost modern art painters in 1952.

Sanford was part of the Second Wave (1941-1960) of the Chicago Black Renaissance of African-American artists and embraced a wide range of styles and influences. An expressionist until 1945, Sanford was clearly influenced by and followed Pablo Picasso's cubism in his paintings, then switched to abstract expressionism for 18 years. During this period, he traveled and worked in Mexico, France, and Las Vegas, but always returned to his home in Chicago. In 1962, he moved Sanford Studio (171 W. Oak Street, Chicago) to the South Side and set up a new studio across the street from the Prairie Shores and Lake Meadows apartments. He returned to social realism and entertained guests in his new studio while he painted for them.

== Early life ==
Sanford grew up and went to school in Chicago and was introduced to art by his teacher there when he was 9 years old. At 13, he took an art correspondence class and dreamt of being a cartoonist. He realized this dream and became official cartoonist for his high school newspaper and sold his first painting when he was 15. Sanford's first exhibition was at the age of 18 at the Renaissance Society of the University of Chicago. In 1937, he took evening classes at the Art Institute of Chicago where he studied oil painting, tempera, ink, pencil, and pastel drawing. He moved to Detroit in 1938 where he studied for a year under artist and head of the art department John Wesley Carroll at the Detroit Society of Arts and Crafts now College for Creative Studies.

== Career and legacy ==
Sanford drew much of his subject matter from Chicago's South Side where he lived for many years. Well known throughout black Chicago, he was often featured in various newspaper and magazines including "The Chicago Defender" and "Negro Digest". Sanford worked by day in his personal studio and in the evenings he regularly painted portraits of entertainers and guests at Chicago's South Side nightclub and music venue Club DeLisa. He was well known for his detailed ink and colored-pencil portraits. Dubbed "The Man Who Paints with the Pencil" and "Master of Pencil Acrobatics" Sanford is known to have painted for many famous people including Roberta Flack and Billie Holiday. "For him, color is a means for distinguishing images that overlap and combine," the late artist and former Chicago Sun-Times art critic Harold Haydon said in 1974. "Figures and faces smiling, grimacing, static and moving, in complex compositions great and small." Sanford became particularly popular in the 1960s for his ink drawings like those of Frederick Douglass, Duke Ellington, Malcolm X, Martin Luther King Jr., Albert Einstein, Buddy Rich, and Miles Davis.

Sanford won many awards and exhibited in more than 40 major shows, including over two dozen one-man shows that he started in 1941. His works hang in hundreds of private collections in Europe and North America and have been exhibited at a variety of locations including the Stuttgart Museum (Germany), Afro Arts Cultural Center (New York), Little Gallery (with Charles Culver, Michigan), Las Vegas Art League (Nevada), Union Gallery (Purdue University, Indiana), Detroit Institute of Art (Michigan), South Shore Cultural Center (Chicago) and South Side Community Art Center (Chicago).

Sanford's art was on exhibit in 2005 at the Corbett vs. Dempsey Gallery in Chicago. The exhibition, Chicago: Northside/Southside, featured 1950s paintings by Walter Sanford and [Jerry Pinsler]. This was the first and last major showing of his work since his death in 1987. Subsequently, several of his paintings were used as featured props and set dressings in connection with the 2006 Warner Bros. feature motion picture "The Lake House'' and, in 2007, the Chicago History Museum borrowed and exhibited one of his largest biomorphic abstracts, self-titled Living Desert, for their exhibition: Big Picture: A New View of Painting in Chicago which surveyed mid 20th century forays into expressionism and abstraction. This large, 49" x 60" oil on masonite painting, was executed in Las Vegas during Sanford's "desert period" together with a series of 22 other works painted during the 19 months he lived in the Nevada desert and were at the core of his 1958 one-man show at the Ligoa Duncan Gallerie des Arts, First Salon of the 48 States, in New York.

== Death ==
Sanford died in 1987. He was cremated at Oakridge Abbey Crematory, Hillside, Illinois.
