= Hin Bredendieck =

German industrial designer and Bauhaus member

- Hin Bredendieck, in 1938
- Born: April 9, 1904; Aurich, German Empire
- Died: September 1, 1995 (aged 91); Roswell, Georgia, U.S.
- Occupations: Designer; Educator
- Known for: Industrial design; Furniture design; Carpentry
- Movement: Bauhaus

Hinrich (Hin) Hermann Fokko Bredendieck (June 9, 1904 – September 1, 1995) was a German industrial designer and educator. Part of the Bauhaus movement, he founded the department of industrial design at Georgia Tech after his emigration to the United States.

== Life ==
Hinrich Hermann Focko Bredendieck was born in Aurich on April 9, 1904, the youngest of seven children of the merchant Hinrich Bredendieck and his wife Altje Gebine née Bohlen. He was an apprentice as a carpenter in Aurich and worked in a furniture factory in Leer. In 1924 he began studies at the arts and crafts school in Stuttgart, moved in 1925 to the arts and crafts school in Hamburg but dropped out after two terms. From 1927 to 1930, Bredendieck was a student at the Bauhaus Dessau, where he worked with Walter Gropius and Paul Klee. In a piece that Bredendieck wrote for Art Journal in 1962, he stated that he had studied under Josef Albers while there. During his studies, Bredendieck developed designs for lamps that were manufactured by the company Körting & Mathiesen (Kandem) from 1928.

Between 1930 and 1931, Bredendieck worked in the studios of László Moholy-Nagy and Herbert Bayer in Berlin. He married the American Virginia Weisshaus, who had also studied at the Bauhaus, in the mid-1930s. In 1937, he emigrated to the United States, and took over the management of the Basic Design Workshop and the Wood and Metal Workshop at the New Bauhaus Chicago. He developed furniture that the customer had to assemble. Along with Nathan Lerner, he helped remodel the interior of the South Side Community Art Center.

He was the founder of the Institute for Industrial Design at the Georgia Institute of Technology in Atlanta in 1940. He was most influential at the Institute from 1952 to 1971, called the Hin Bredendieck Era.

Bredendieck died in Roswell, Georgia, on 1 September 1995.

== Estate ==
Hin Bredendieck's estate is spread over three locations. Bredendieck gave some objects to the Bauhaus Archive during his lifetime. The ME1002 work stool developed by Bredendieck together with Hermann Gautel is also kept there, a donation from Iwao Yamawaki. A large portion of his estate is held by the library of the Georgia Institute of Technology in Atlanta. Another partial estate is kept in the State Museum for Art and Cultural History in Oldenburg.

== Exhibitions ==
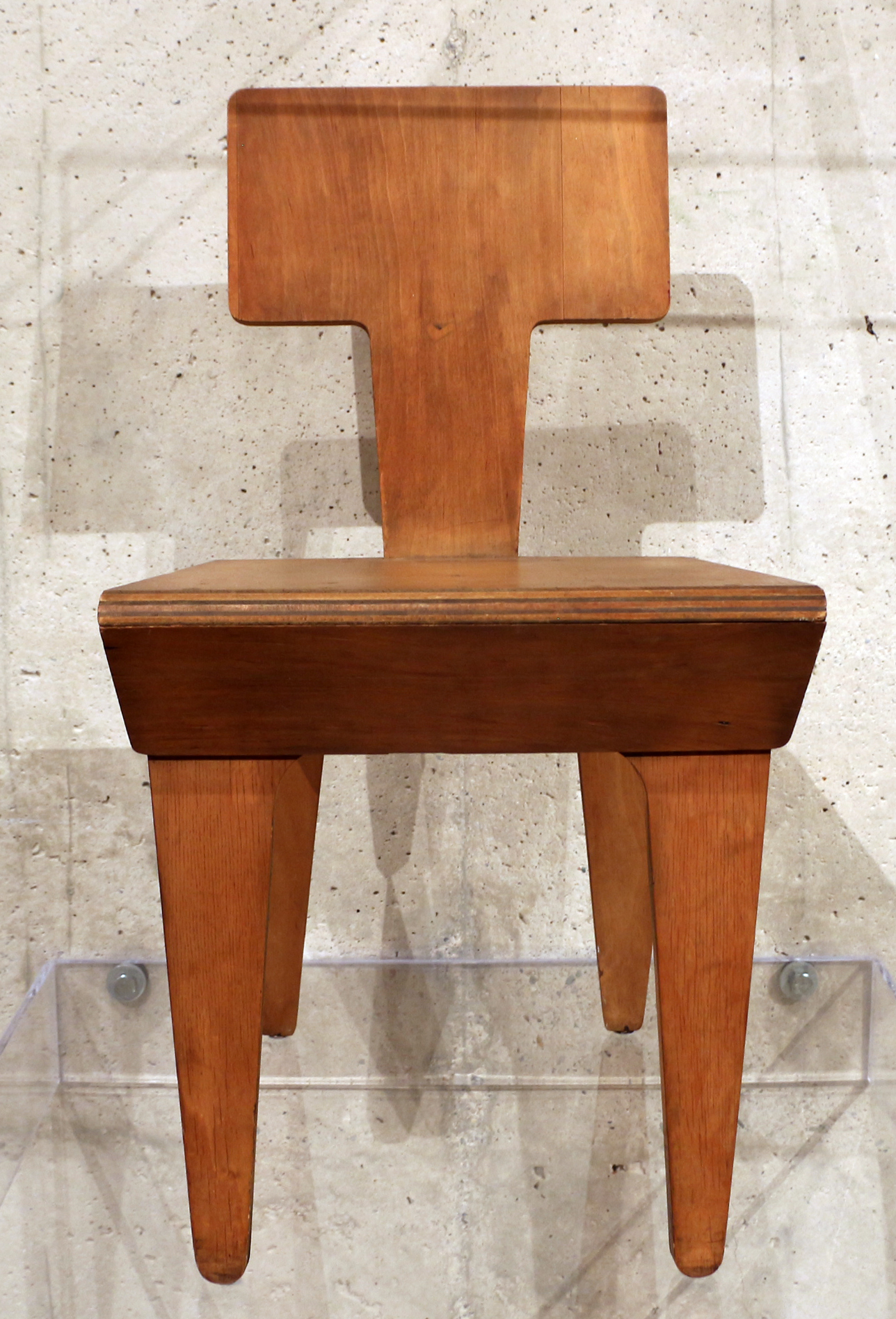
Nathan Lerner and Hin Bredendieck, chair, c. 1949

- State Museum of Art and Cultural History Oldenburg, 2019
- Georgia Tech Library, Atlanta, 2021
