= The African Tale =

- Африканская сказка
- Genre: Satire; Hand-drawn animation
- Based on: Fairytales by Jomo Kenyatta
- Written by: Igor Bolgarin; Igor Nikolaev
- Directed by: Leonid Aristov; Igor Nikolaev
- Starring: Sergei Tseits; Alexey Konsovsky
- Composer: Ivar Arseev
- Country of origin: Soviet Union

Production
- Animators: Violetta Karp; Leonid Nosyrev; Konstantin Chikin; Vladimir Krumin; Olga Stolbova; Galina Barinova; Vladimir Morozov; Valentin Kushnerev
- Running time: 15 minutes
- Production company: Soyuzmultfilm

Original release
- Release: 1963

The African Tale (Russian: Африканская сказка, romanized: Afrikanskaya skazka) is a 1963 Soviet animated film about the enslavement of a black man by "civilized" animals, directed by Leonid Aristov and Igor Nikolaev and based on the legend of Jomo Kenyatta, the leader of the Kenyan national movement. It is an allegorical story about the struggle of African peoples against colonizers. The film was released in 1963, the year Kenya gained independence from Great Britain and Jomo Kenyatta was elected president.

The cartoon was launched into production under the title Black Man and White Elephant, and in the copy preserved in the film library of the Soyuzmultfilm studio, the original title reads By the Law of the Jungle.

== Plot ==
The Black Man lived on his land, and it generously gave him its fruits, for he toiled by the sweat of his brow. But one day, the White Elephant appeared on this land, saying, "What a rich land! I'm damn lucky to be the first of the animals here!" The Elephant treated the Man to a cigarette and gave him glossy magazines with beauties on the covers and flashy ads.

While the Black Man, leafing through magazines, was becoming familiar with "high civilization," Mr. Elephant unceremoniously devoured everything he could and took over the owner's house. To evict the "guest," the Black Man appealed to the "beast lords' court," where Mr. Elephant declared that in exchange for the generous gifts of civilization (cigarettes and magazines), the Black Man must give up everything and "not stir up trouble with protests." The presiding judge, Lev, accused the Black Man of slandering "the Elephant's best friend."

The court found the Black Man guilty, but due to his "backwardness and savagery," he deserved leniency, and he was allowed to build a new house. But every time the Black Man built a new house, some animal would occupy it: a rhinoceros- cardinal , a hyena-prosecutor, a crocodile-lawyer. Then Man built a large hut. A squabble broke out among the animals for possession. When they all climbed inside, the Black Man set it on fire, and the animals fled in panic.

== Film crew ==
- Screenwriters: Igor Bolgarin, Igor Nikolaev
- Producers: Leonid Aristov, Igor Nikolaev
- Artist Director: Nathan Lerner
- Composer: Ivar Arseev

== Festivals ==
In 2008, the cartoon was shown at the Big Cartoon Festival in the program of animation historian Georgy Borodin “Soviet anti-imperialist cartoons 1940-60”.
