= Frank Marshall Davis =

American writer, activist and businessman (1905–1987)

- Born: December 31, 1905; Arkansas City, Kansas, U.S.
- Died: July 26, 1987 (aged 81); Honolulu, Hawaii, U.S.
- Occupations: Journalist, poet
- Writing career
- Pen name: Frank Boganey
- Subjects: Race relations, music, literature, American culture
- Movement: Social realism

Frank Marshall Davis (December 31, 1905 – July 26, 1987) was an American writer, poet, political and labor activist and businessman.

Davis began his career writing for African American newspapers in Chicago. He moved to Atlanta, where he became the editor of the paper he turned into the Atlanta Daily World. He later returned to Chicago. During this time, he was outspoken about political and social issues, while also covering topics that ranged from sports to music. His poetry was sponsored by the Works Progress Administration (WPA) under President Franklin D. Roosevelt's New Deal programs. He also played a role in the South Side Writers Group in Chicago, and is considered among the writers of the Black Chicago Renaissance.

In the late 1940s, Davis moved to Honolulu, Hawaii, where he ran a small business. He became involved in local labor issues. The Federal Bureau of Investigation (FBI) tracked his activities as they had investigated union activists since the early 20th century.

== Early life ==
Davis was born in Arkansas City, Kansas, on December 31, 1905. His parents divorced, and Davis grew up living with his mother and stepfather, and with his maternal grandparents. he graduated from Arkansas City High School (Kansas). In 1923, at age 17, he attended Friends University. From 1924 to 1927, and again in 1929, he attended Kansas State Agricultural College, now Kansas State University.

When Davis entered Kansas State, twenty-five other African-American students were enrolled. Kansas was segregated by custom, if not by law. Davis studied industrial journalism. He began to write poems as the result of a class assignment, and was encouraged by an English literature instructor to continue his poetry writing. Davis pledged Phi Beta Sigma fraternity in 1925. He left college before getting a degree.

== Early career ==
In 1927, Davis moved to Chicago, a destination of tens of thousands of African Americans during the Great Migration. He worked variously for the Chicago Evening Bulletin, the Chicago Whip, and the Gary American, all African American newspapers. He also wrote free-lance articles and short stories for African American magazines. During this time Davis began to write poetry seriously, including his first long poem, entitled Chicago's Congo, Sonata for an Orchestra.

In 1931, Davis moved to Atlanta to become an editor of a twice-weekly paper. Later that year he became the paper's managing editor. In 1932 the paper, renamed as the Atlanta Daily World became the nation's first successful black daily newspaper. Davis continued to write and publish poems, which came to the attention of Chicago socialite Frances Norton Manning. She introduced him to Norman Forgue, the publisher of Black Cat Press. In the summer of 1935, Forgue published Davis' first book, Black Man's Verse.

In 1935, Davis returned to Chicago to take the position of managing editor of the Associated Negro Press (ANP), a news service founded in 1919 for black newspapers. Eventually, Davis became executive editor of the ANP. He held the position until 1947. While in Chicago, Davis also started a photography club, worked for numerous political parties, and participated in the League of American Writers. Davis was an avid photographer, and inspired writer Richard Wright's interest in the field.

Davis wrote that his photography consisted in large part of nudes because "the female body fascinates me, both aesthetically and emotionally." He said that when photographing, he focused on "contours" and the "wide range of tones".

Davis, Richard Wright, Margaret Walker, and others were part of the South Side Writers Group, which met regularly beginning in 1936 to critique each other's work. They were part of what became known as the Black Chicago Renaissance.

Davis also worked as a sports reporter, in particular covering the rivalry between African-American boxer Joe Louis and the German Max Schmeling. He and other writers portrayed their confrontation as democracy and equality vs. fascism. Davis used his journalism to call for integration of the sports world. He believed that sports was a field in which men could break the color bar, and was a way to reach out to a working class. During the Great Depression, Davis participated in the federal Federal Writers' Project, under the Works Progress Administration and part of President Franklin D. Roosevelt's New Deal. In 1937 he received a Julius Rosenwald Fellowship, funded by the president of Sears Roebuck, who became a major philanthropist.

He began to work on community organizing, starting a Chicago labor newspaper, The Star, toward the end of World War II. The paper's goal was to "promote a policy of cooperation and unity between Russia and the United States" seeking to "[avoid] the red-baiting tendencies of the mainstream press." In 1947, the Spokane Daily Chronicle of Washington state described the paper as "a red weekly", saying that it "has most of the markings of a Communist front publication." After World War II, Americans became suspicious of the Soviet Union, a former ally, after it extended its control over Eastern Europe, and fears were raised about the influence of Communism in the US.

In 1945, Davis taught one of the first jazz history courses in the United States, at the Abraham Lincoln School in Chicago. In 1948, with the encouragement of authors such as Richard Wright and Margaret Walker, Davis published a collection of poems, entitled 47th Street: Poems. The collection chronicled the varied life of African Americans on Chicago's South Side. Davis had been a strong supporter of the work of Richard Wright, describing his Uncle Tom's Children as "the most absorbing fiction penned by a Negro since George Schuyler's Black No More" (1931).

After Wright published articles explaining his break with communism, the two writers fell out. In his memoir Livin' the Blues (1992), Davis described Wright's essays on this theme as "an act of treason in the fight for our rights and aided only the racists who were constantly seeking any means to destroy cooperation between Reds and blacks."

Davis promoted the ideal of a "raceless" society, based on his belief that race as a biological or social construct was illogical and a fallacy. Davis was a member of the Civil Rights Congress in 1947–1948, and was vice chair of the Chicago Civil Liberties Committee from 1944 to 1947. He was a supporter of Henry Wallace's Progressive Party.

In Livin' the Blues, Davis wrote of the period 1935 to 1948, "I worked with all kinds of groups. I made no distinction between those labeled Communist, Socialist or merely liberal. My sole criterion was this: Are you with me in my determination to wipe out white supremacy?" Some libraries removed his books, and he was the subject of FBI investigations in the 1940s and 1950s. Tidwell, however, states that Davis became a closet member of the Communist Party.

== Career in Hawaii ==
In 1948, Davis and his second wife, whom he had married in 1946, moved to Honolulu, Hawaii. In a 1974 interview with Black World/Negro Digest, Davis said they had been attracted to the place because of a magazine article his wife had read. In Hawaii, Davis wrote a weekly column, called "Frank-ly Speaking," for the Honolulu Record, a labor paper published by the International Longshore and Warehouse Union (ILWU). Davis's early columns covered labor issues, but he broadened his scope to write about cultural and political issues, especially racism. He also explored the history of blues and jazz in his columns. Davis published little poetry between 1948 and 1978, when his final volume, Awakening, and Other Poems, was published.

In 1968, Davis wrote a pornographic novel, titled Sex Rebel: Black, publishing it under the pseudonym Bob Greene. It was published by William Hamling's Greenleaf Publishing Company.

In 1973, Davis visited Howard University, a historically black college in Washington, D.C., to deliver a poetry reading, marking the first time in 25 years that he had visited the U.S. mainland. His work began to be published in anthologies as there was a revival of interest in black writers due to the civil rights movement and increasing activism.

Davis died on July 26, 1987, aged 81, in Honolulu, of a heart attack. Three works were published posthumously: Livin' the Blues: Memories of a Black Journalist and Poet (1992), Black Moods: Collected Poems (2002), and Writings of Frank Marshall Davis: A Voice of the Black Press (2007).

== Personal life ==
Davis was married to Thelma Boyd, his first wife, for 13 years. For a time, while Davis worked in Chicago, Thelma lived and worked in Atlanta and later in Washington, DC.

In 1946, he married Helen Canfield, a woman whom he had met in one of his classes; she was 18 years younger than him. Davis and Canfield divorced in 1970. Davis had a son, Mark, and four daughters: Lynn, Beth, Jeanne, and Jill.

== Analysis of literary work ==
Davis said he was captivated by "the new revolutionary style called free verse. Sonnets and, in fact, all rhyme held little interest for" him. Davis found inspiration in Midwestern poets and their use of vernacular language. He claimed his "greatest single influence" was Carl Sandburg "because of his hard, muscular poetry."

Richard Guzman highlights Davis' poetry for its "social engagement, especially in the fight against racism" as well as its "fluent language and stunning imagery." Stacy I. Morgan states that in his work, Davis "delighted in contradicting reader expectations".

== Legacy and impact ==
Kathryn Waddell Takara said of Davis's political and literary legacy:

No significant African American community existed in Hawai`i to provide Davis with emotional and moral support, and an expanded audience and market for his writing. Also, because he was still concerned with the issues of freedom, racism, and equality, he lacked widespread multi cultural support.... It can be argued that Davis escaped defeat like a trickster, playing dead only to arise later and win the race, although the politics of defeat were all around him. If society seemed to defeat him by denying him financial rewards, publication, and status, he continued to write prolifically. He stood by his principle that the only way to achieve social equality was to acknowledge and discuss publicly the racial and ethnic dynamics in all their complexity situated in an unjust society. He provided a bold, defiant model for writers to hold onto their convictions and articulate them.

Davis has been cited as being an influence on poet and publisher Dudley Randall. Through exposure provided by Randall, Stephen Henderson and Margaret Taylor Goss Burroughs, Davis influenced the Black Arts Movement. In 2018, he was inducted into the Chicago Literary Hall of Fame.

In Barack Obama's memoir Dreams from My Father (1995), Davis is referred to as a friend in Hawaii of Obama's maternal grandfather Stanley Dunham; Obama later identified the man as Davis. Obama said Davis recounted that he and Stanley Dunham had grown up 50 miles apart in Kansas, near Wichita, although they did not meet until living in Hawaii. Davis described the way Kansas race relations were back then, including Jim Crow restrictions, and his belief that there had been little progress since then. As Obama remembered, "It made me smile, thinking back on Frank and his old Black Power, dashiki self. In some ways he was as incurable as my mother, as certain in his faith, living in the same sixties time warp that Hawaii had created." Obama also remembered Frank Davis later in life after taking a job in South Chicago as a community organizer. One day Obama visited areas where Davis had lived, writing, "I imagined Frank in a baggy suit and wide lapels, standing in front of the old Regal Theatre, waiting to see Duke or Ella emerge from a gig."

== Works ==
Selected works

- Black Man's Verse; Black Cat, (Chicago, IL), 1935.
- I Am the American Negro, Black Cat, (Chicago, IL), 1937, ISBN 978-0-8369-8920-5
- Through Sepia Eyes; Black Cat, (Chicago, IL), 1938.
- 47th Street: Poems; Decker (Prairie City, IL), 1948.
- Black Man's Verse; Black Cat (Skokie, IL), 1961.
- Sex Rebel: Black (Memoirs of a Gash Gourmet), (written under pseudonym "Bob Greene"); Greenleaf Publishing Company (Evanston, IL), 1968.
- Jazz Interludes: Seven Musical Poems; Black Cat (Skokie, IL), 1977.
- Awakening and Other Poems; Black Cat (Skokie, IL), 1978.
- Livin' the Blues: Memoirs of a Black Journalist and Poet, ed. John Edgar Tidwell; University of Wisconsin Press, 1992, ISBN 978-0-299-13500-3
- Black Moods: Collected Poems, ed. John Edgar Tidwell; University of Illinois Press, 2002, ISBN 978-0-252-02738-3
- Writings of Frank Marshall Davis: A Voice of the Black Press, ed. by John Edgar Tidwell; University Press of Mississippi, 2007. ISBN 1-57806-921-1; ISBN 978-1-57806-921-7

== Sources ==
- King, Woodie Jr., ed., The Forerunners: Black Poets in America, Howard University Press, 1975.
- An Interview with Frank Marshall Davis, by John Edgar Tidwell. Black American Literature Forum, Vol. 19, No. 3, Autumn, 1985, pp. 105–108
- African American Review, Summer–Fall 2003, p. 466.
- Black Scholar, Summer 1996, p. 17.
- Western Journal of Black Studies, Winter 2002, p. 215.
- "Frank Marshall Davis: Black Labor Activist and Outsider Journalist: Social Movements in Hawai`i" by Kathryn Waddell Takara, PhD
- Takara, Kathryn Waddell. Frank Marshall Davis: The Fire and the Phoenix (A Critical Biography)
- blog compiled from editorials Frank Marshall Davis had written for the Honolulu Record from the Center for Labor Education & Research, University of Hawaii – West Oahu
