= Marian Minus =

American writer (1914–1972)

- Born: Mattie Marian Minus; September 4, 1914; South Carolina, U.S.
- Died: October 1972 (aged 58)
- Occupation: Writer
- Partner: Dorothy West

Mattie Marian Minus (September 4, 1914 – October 1972) was an American writer associated with the Harlem Renaissance, especially with writers Dorothy West and Richard Wright.

== Early life and education ==
Minus was born in South Carolina and raised in Dayton, Ohio, the daughter of Laura Whitener Minus and Claude Wellington Minus. Her mother was a seamstress who worked for the WPA; her father was a pharmacist and taught at Wilberforce University. Her maternal grandmother, Laura Lyles, was white, and the model for a character in Dorothy West's 1995 novel The Wedding. Minus won an award for perfect grades in 1932, and graduated at the top of her class at Fisk University in 1935, and began graduate studies in anthropology, on a Rosenwald Fund fellowship, at the University of Chicago.

At Fisk, Minus was the first woman elected to Sigma Upsilon Pi honor society, and the president of the Alpha Beta chapter of Delta Sigma Theta sorority.

== Career ==
In Chicago in the 1930s, Minus became a member of the South Side Writers Group with Richard Wright. With Wright and her partner, Dorothy West, she was co-editor of Challenge, a literary magazine, and of its more political successor, New Challenge. "The only prejudice editors Dorothy West, Marian Minus, and Richard Wright own to is a distinct anti-fascist prejudice and they mix no words in saying so," noted one reviewer in 1937.

Minus wrote short stories, typed manuscripts for West, and worked for Consumers Union. In 1942, she gave an anthropology lecture at the School for Democracy in New York City. She won an award from Simon & Schuster to write a novel, Time is my Enemy, in 1946. In 1958, she became personnel director for Consumers Union, based in Mount Vernon, New York.

== Publications ==
- "The Negro as a Consumer" (1937, Opportunity, article)
- "The Fine Line" (1939, short story)
- "Girl, Colored" (1940, The Crisis, short story)
- "Half-Bright" (1940, Opportunity, short story)
- "The Threat to Mr. David" (1947, short story, Woman's Day)

== Personal life and legacy ==
Minus had a longtime personal and professional partnership with writer Dorothy West; they lived together in New York City at the time of the 1940 census, and on Martha's Vineyard. In the 1950 census, she was recorded living with her mother in New York City. Later in life she lived with Edna Pemberton. Minus died in 1972, in her fifties.

Her story "Girl, Colored" has been anthologized several times. It was included in Black Women's Blues (1992), Ebony Rising (2004), in an anthology of Harlem Renaissance short fiction, and in a 2011 anthology of stories by Black women in The Crisis.
