= South Side Writers Group =

Part of the Chicago Black Renaissance

The South Side Writers Group (SSWG) was a circle of African-American writers and poets formed in the 1930s in South Side, Chicago as part of the Chicago Black Renaissance. The SSWG benefitted from the Work Project Administration's artist relief efforts in the wake of the Great Depression. Debuting at a Chicago Writers Group conference in June of 1936, the SSWG included Richard Wright, Arna Bontemps, Margaret Walker, Fenton Johnson, Theodore Ward, Garfield Gordon, Frank Marshall Davis, Julius Weil, Dorothy Sutton, Marian Minus, Russell Marshall, Robert Davis, Marion Perkins, Arthur Bland, Fern Gayden, and Alberta Sims. Consisting of some twenty members, the group championed the New Realism movement and social realism. They met at the Abraham Lincoln Center on South Cottage Grove Avenue near the Bronzeville District.

== Legacy ==
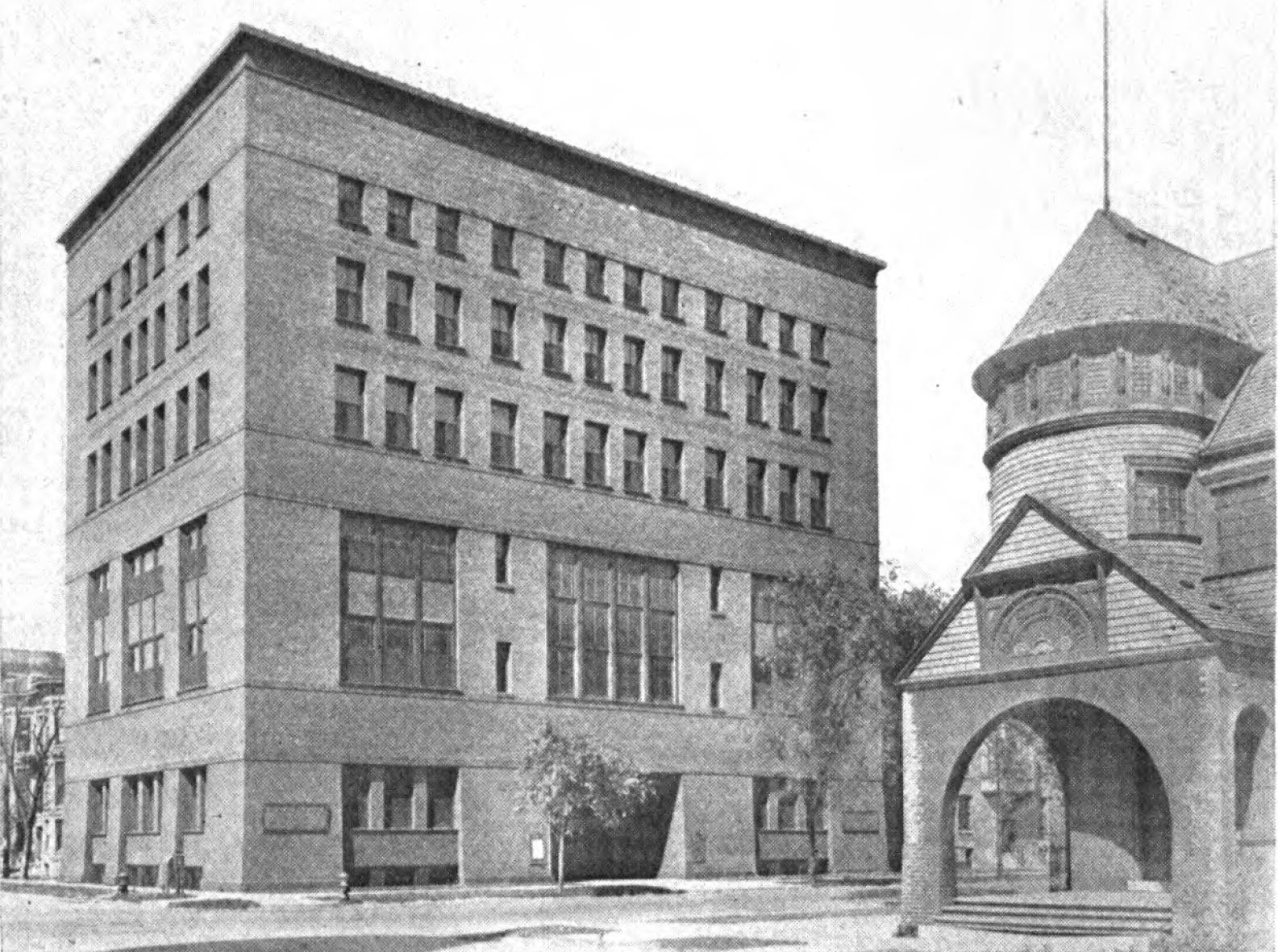
The Abraham Lincoln Center, which housed the Illinois Writers Project and was the site of SSWG meetings.

Richard Wright published "Blueprint for Negro Writing" while writing with the SSWG. The "Blueprint," which calls for a more authentic depiction of Black life, is considered the central piece of literary theory for the Chicago Black Renaissance.

== See also ==
- Chicago Black Renaissance
