= Abraham Lincoln School for Social Science =

Defunct school in Chicago, Illinois

- Chicago, Illinois; United States

Information
- Founders: William L. Patterson

The Abraham Lincoln School for Social Science in Chicago, Illinois was a "broad, nonpartisan school for workers, writers, and their sympathizers," aimed at the thousands of African-American workers who had migrated to Chicago from the American South during the 1930s and 1940s.

== Institutional history ==
The Abraham Lincoln School for Social Science was founded by prominent civil rights activist and attorney William L. Patterson, who had organized the defense of the Scottsboro Boys.

The Lincoln School was among the first to offer a jazz history course, taught by Frank Marshall Davis, in 1945. In April 1947, it sponsored “Chicago Salutes Paul Robeson” at the Civic Opera House, where Lena Horne and others paid tribute to famed singer and civil rights activist Paul Robeson. Robeson's outspoken support of civil rights and the labor movement, and criticism of American foreign policy, had led to government scrutiny and resulting in his blacklisting by many concert halls.

Soon afterwards, the school was accused of being an adjunct of the Communist Party USA by Attorney General Tom C. Clark in December 1947, again in the 1948 by the California Senate Factfinding Subcommittee on Un-American Activities and a target of HUAC during the years leading up to McCarthy Era.

Faculty members included Morris Backall, Michael Baker, Frank Marshall Davis, Horace Davis, David Englestein, Morton Goldsholl, Pat Hoverder, Alfonso Iannelli, Leon Katzen, Ludwig Kruhe, Herschel Meyer, Henry Noyes, William L. Patterson, Fred Ptashne, Eleanore Redwin, Boris M. Revsine, Frank Sokolik, William Rose, Herman Schendel, Bernice Targ, Morris Topchevsky, and Alban Dewes Winspear. A notice appearing in a catalog of the school stated that "prominent citizens participating in our efforts" include Paul Robeson, Rockwell Kent, Lee Pressman, Howard Fast, Albert E. Kahn, and Henrietta Buckmaster.

== See also ==
- New York Workers School
- Jefferson School of Social Science

== External sources ==
- "Defend workers education and freedom of the press! (pamphlet)". Chicago Workers School. December 28, 1934.
