= Morris Topchevsky =

American painter

- Born: 1899; Białystok
- Died: 1947 (aged 47–48)
- Movement: Social realism

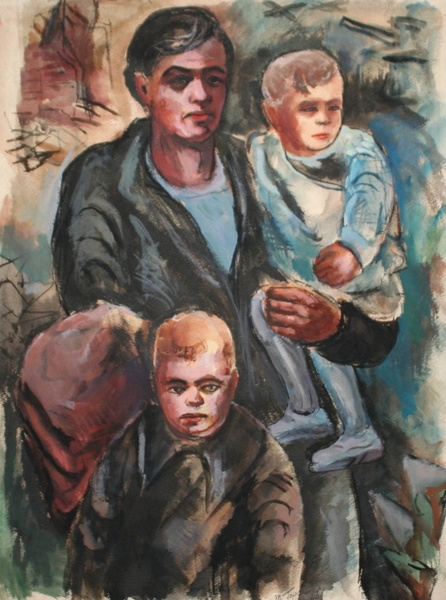
"Refugees"

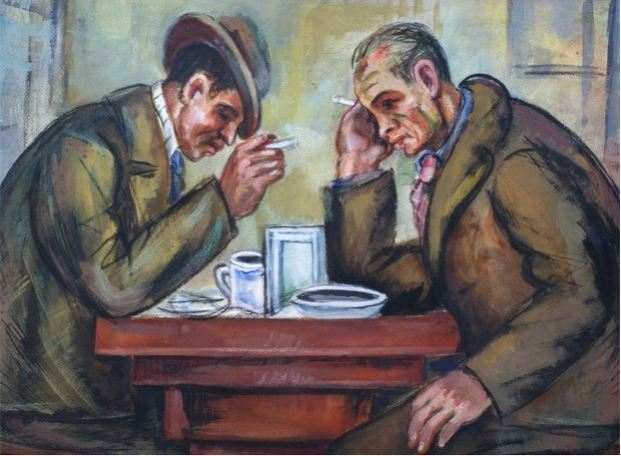
"Lunch Hour"

Morris Topchevsky (1899–1947) was a Chicago-based social realist artist.

== Biography ==
Morris Topchevsky was born in Białystok, Poland (then a part of Russia) and immigrated to Chicago, Illinois with his family in 1910 to escape anti-Jewish violence. He worked both as a printmaker and a painter using oils and watercolor, and initially started his career as a sign painter. He studied art at the Hull House Settlement, and later at the School of the Art Institute of Chicago. In 1924, he traveled to Mexico City where he met influential Mexican artists like Diego Rivera.

Upon his return to Chicago, he became an instructor at Hull House, the Abraham Lincoln School for Social Science, and the South Side Community Art Center. In the 1930s he worked as part of the WPA’s Federal Art Project in Illinois. Topchevsky served as an early mentor to Chicago artist Charles White. His younger brother, Alex Topchevsky (Topp), was also an artist.

His work was exhibited widely throughout his lifetime including at The Art Institute of Chicago, the John Reed Club of Chicago, the Pennsylvania Academy of the Fine Arts, the Renaissance Society of the University of Chicago and the Witte Museum in San Antonio, Texas.
