= Frank London Brown =

- Born: Frank London Brown; October 17, 1927; Kansas City, Missouri, US
- Died: March 12, 1962 (aged 34); Chicago, Illinois, US
- Education: Roosevelt University; University of Chicago
- Occupations: Author; trade unionist
- Spouse: Evelyn Brown-Colbert
- Children: 3

Frank London Brown (October 17, 1927 – March 12, 1962) was an American writer, activist, and union leader known for his significant contributions to literature, civil rights, and workers' rights. Born in Kansas City Missouri, to an African-American family, and raised on the South Side of Chicago, Brown's upbringing in a racially charged environment greatly influenced his later work and activism on civil rights and in labor organizing. His writings include two novels, Trumbull Park (1959) and The Myth Maker (posthumous publication, 1969), recognized as contributions in literary realism and literary existentialism. A part of the Chicago Black Renaissance, his novels portrayed African-American experiences in Chicago and urban America. In 2019, he was inducted into the Chicago Literary Hall of Fame.

== Life ==
Frank London Brown was born to Myrtle and Frank Brown on October 17, 1927, in Kansas City, Missouri. In 1939, seeking better opportunities and refuge from racial prejudice, the Brown family relocated to the impoverished neighborhoods on the South Side of Chicago. Brown attended Colman Elementary School and DuSable High School, where he discovered his passion for writing, thanks to a supportive teacher. His upbringing on the South Side streets, often reminiscent of the harsh realities of life, significantly molded his growth as an artist. His formal education was supplemented with enlightened perceptions from his neighborhood, which proved instrumental as he navigated the path to adulthood. Brown enlisted in the U.S. Army, and sang baritone in a group, likely inspired by fond memories of the Hi-Jinks. He graduated with a bachelor's degree from Roosevelt University, and went on to graduate school at the University of Chicago where he became part of the Committee on Social Thought, earning a master's degree and working toward a PhD. While attending school and pursuing his writing, he worked various jobs, including as a union organizer for the United Packinghouse Workers of America.

In addition to short stories and novels, Brown was a prolific journalist, writing for the Chicago Defender, Chicago Review, Chicago Sun-Times, Chicago Tribune, Ebony, Negro Digest, and other periodicals. His coverage of the Emmett Till murder became especially well known. A devotee of jazz and blues music (in which genres he sometimes performed as a club vocalist) he wrote a seminal article on Thelonious Monk for DownBeat magazine.

Brown was diagnosed with leukemia in 1961 and died the following year.

== Work ==
- Trumbull Park. A novel. Regnery, Chicago 1959; Northeastern University Press, Boston, Mass. 2005, ISBN 9781555536282.
- Short stories. 2nd ed. Frank London Brown Historical Association, Chicago 1969.
- The myth maker. A novel. Path Press, Chicago 1969.
- This Is life: Rediscovered short fiction by Frank London Brown. Edited by Michael W. Phillips Jr. Chicago: From Beyond Press, 2023 ISBN 9798987574324 (collection of "flash fiction" stories, originally published by Brown in the Chicago Defender).

=== In anthologies ===
- Ulli Beier (ed.): Black Orpheus. An anthology of new African and Afro-American stories. 1st ed. McGraw-Hill Book Company, New York 1965.
- Langston Hughes (ed.): The best short stories by Negro writers. An anthology from 1899 to the present. 1st ed. Little, Brown and Company, Boston 1967.
- Wayne Charles Miller (ed.): A gathering of ghetto writers: Irish, Italian, Jewish, Black, and Puerto Rican. New York University Press, New York 1972, ISBN 9780814753583.
- John Henrik Clarke (ed.): Black American short stories. One hundred years of the best. Hill and Wang, New York 1993.
- Sascha Feinstein and David Rife (eds.): The jazz fiction anthology. Indiana University Press, Bloomington 2009, ISBN 0253221374.
- Abraham Chapman (ed.): Black voices: an anthology of Afro-American literature. New American Library, New York and Scarborough, Ontario 1968.
- William Adams, Peter Conn, Barry Slepian (eds.): Afro-American literature: fiction. Houghton Mifflin Company, Boston, Massachusetts 1970.
- Gerald Camp and James Gray (eds.): The pleasures of fiction. Addison-Wesley Publishing Company, Inc., Philippines 1972.
- John Henrik Clarke (ed.): American Negro short stories. Hill and Wang, New York 1966.
