= Chicago Star =

Former weekly newspaper

The Chicago Star was a weekly publication, founded in 1946 and financed by trade unions. The board of directors were Ernest De Maio, Frank Marshall Davis, William L. Patterson, Grant Oakes, and William Sennett. Davis was the executive editor, Sennett the general manager, and Carl Hirsch managing editor. Howard Fast was a columnist, and Rockwell Kent a contributing editor. In an introduction to a book about Davis, John Edgar Tidwell indicated that the first issue was launched on July 4th to "[wrap] itself in the holiday's symbolic meaning." The paper carried Davis's weekly editorial "Frank-ly Speaking".

The newspaper has been described as "openly leftist". In 1947, the Spokane Daily Chronicle called the paper "a red weekly" saying that it "has most of the markings of a Communist front publication." The Chicago Star had a goal to "promote a policy of cooperation and unity between Russia and the United States" seeking to "[avoid] the red-baiting tendencies of the mainstream press."

One of its writers was Richard Durham, who would later produce the notable radio series Destination Freedom.
