= Helene Johnson =

American poet (1906–1995)

Helen Johnson
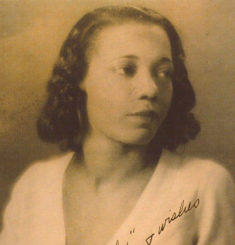
- Born: July 7, 1906; Boston, Massachusetts, United States
- Died: July 6, 1995 (aged 88); New York City, United States
- Spouse: William Hubbell (m. 1933, divorced)
- Children: Abigail McGrath
- Relatives: Dorothy West (cousin)

Helen Johnson (July 7, 1906 – July 6, 1995) was an African-American poet during the Harlem Renaissance. She is remembered today for her poetry that captures both the challenges and the excitement of this era during her short-lived career.

== Personal life ==
=== Adolescence ===
Ella Benson and George William Johnson welcomed Helene (born Helen) Johnson into the world on July 7, 1906, in Boston, Massachusetts.

Her parents divorced soon after she was born. This left little to no trace of her father's life to the public. It is known that her mother was a domestic worker. Johnson was raised mostly by her mother and maternal grandpa, Benjamin Benson. Her early years were spent in Brookline, Massachusetts.

Johnson was named for her maternal grandmother, Helen Pease Benson, who was born into slavery in Camden, South Carolina, alongside husband Benjamin Benson. Ella, Minnie, and Rachel were the couple's three daughters.

Johnson's aunts Minnie and Rachel were fairly active in her life. Her aunt gave her the nickname Helene, which she carried with her for the rest of her life. Johnson was raised in Brookline with her cousin and future Harlem Renaissance novelist writer, Dorothy West. The two spent summers together in Oak Bluffs, Massachusetts. Helene received her high school education at the exceptionally rigorous and well-respected Boston Girls' Latin School.

=== Adulthood ===
Johnson took courses at both Boston University and Columbia University after graduating high school but did not obtain her degree from either.

After leaving New York in 1929, Johnson returned to Boston. She married William Warner Hubbell III in 1933, and the couple had one daughter, Abigail. Sources close to the family report that the marriage later ended in divorce, though no legal record of the separation has been found. Johnson did not remarry.

== Career ==
Johnson's literary career began when she became affiliated with the Saturday Evening Quill Club, where she claimed first prize in a short-story competition sponsored by the Boston Chronicle.

Johnson published several periodicals throughout the 1920s and the early 1930s, when she was 19 years old. During this time, she published more than thirty poems in many different magazines. These magazines typically were African-American known, and included the NAACP's The Crisis, edited by W. E. B. Du Bois. She gained most of her notability from her work published in the journal of the National Urban League, Opportunity: A Journal of Negro Life, which was a leading platform that showcased the talents of African-American artists. In 1925, Johnson collected multiple honorable mentions in a poetry contest organized by Opportunity. Johnson received her first poetry award in the National Urban League's Inaugural Contest that same year. In 1926, six of her poems were published by Opportunity. Her poetry also appears in the first, and only, issue of Fire!!, a magazine edited by Wallace Thurman, Langston Hughes, and Richard Bruce Nugent. Because of this recognition, many renowned poets of the time began recognizing Johnson's potential and considered her to be outstanding for her age. These awarded poets include Zora Neale Hurston, Countee Cullen, Claude McKay, and others.

Johnson, along with Dorothy West, moved in 1927 to Harlem, where they began taking classes at Colombia University to improve their writing. During this time, they befriended fellow writers such as Zora Neale Hurston. She reached the height of her popularity in 1927, when her poem "Bottled" was published in the May issue of Vanity Fair. The poem was known to illustrate varying aspects of African-American culture.

In 1935, Johnson's last published poems appeared in Challenge: A Literary Quarterly. Though her free verse poems are more often anthologized, her sonnets offer complex and sometimes deliberately ambiguous portrayals of black women's integrity. In particular, in a couple of her sonnets "Missionary Brings a Young Native to America" and "Sonnet to a Negro in Harlem", there was the shared contrast between sonnet and song is illuminated. This is one way that Johnson exploits the subtle differences of the form to simultaneously embody and critique the American sonnet tradition through her writing.

Upon her departure from Boston, Johnson resettled in Manhattan in New York City and worked more traditional jobs. With the ending of her formal career as a poet, Johnson began to avoid all media attention entirely. Although readers were confused by her disappearance, Johnson never explained the reasoning behind this decision. However, even out of public's eye, Johnson continued to write, and eventually, her work appeared in anthologies.

== Works ==
Johnson was an important but long-underappreciated poet of the Harlem Renaissance; her work combines experimental modernist approaches with classic poetry. Throughout her works, she was one of many trailblazing writers who opposed the ideals of white male superiority that was present in her time. Although she only published 34 poems throughout the 1920s and early 1930s, later collections reveal a consistent engagement with race, gender, class, and cultural identity. She is now recognized by scholars as a pivotal player in the development of a uniquely Black feminist and urban modernist poetics.

=== Poetic influences ===
Various literary figures influenced Helene Johnson's writing, many of whom she later became close friends with as a result of her participation in the African American poetry community. Several of her favorite poets are listed in William Stanley Braithwaite's 1926 Anthology of Magazine Verse, including Carl Sandburg, Walt Whitman, Alfred Lord Tennyson, and Percy Bysshe Shelley. She also had strong connections to prominent members of the Harlem Renaissance, including James Weldon Johnson, Zora Neale Hurston, and Langston Hughes. Johnson often acknowledged the influence of these writers on her own artistic growth, even though they were in her personal friend group.

== Poetry themes ==
=== Gender and femininity ===
A major theme in Johnson's writing is gender and feminist criticism. Poems like "Futility" question the constrictive standards of bourgeois femininity by supporting women's sexual autonomy and agency above the parlor-bound ideal of passive womanhood. Johnson's adaptation of Eliot's "The Love Song of J. Alfred Prufrock" further demonstrates her feminist viewpoint. She reimagines the contemporary topic in her late poem "Time After Time" as an older working-class woman juggling the demands of metropolitan life rather than a paralyzed, self-pitying male. By highlighting this character, Johnson reaffirms the importance of Black women's lived experiences while exposing the gender and economic prejudice ingrained in canonical modernism.

=== Race and culture ===
Johnson presents Harlem as a place of energy, community, and social promise in her early Harlem Renaissance poems. She combats the isolation and corruption associated with American modernists like T. S. Eliot in poems like "Fulfillment" and "Poem." Johnson portrays "wet giggle[s]" on the street and close relationships among Black urban residents in place of Eliot's "muddy feet". The people celebrate Black music, vernacular language, and everyday interactions as sources of empowerment, embracing the city's cultural pulse. Johnson strategically engages with primitivist imagery in this affirmation of Black cultural life, referencing African symbols only to challenge their romanticization and ultimately rooting identity in modern Black experience.

Johnson's poetry also contributes to the New Negro movement's larger cultural nationalist agenda. Johnson entered a male-dominated discourse of racial uplift by using the ballad form. Johnson was able to express a respectable and politically strong Black feminine subjectivity through the ballad's connections to national history, folk heritage, and communal identification. She presents Blackness as a struggle that transforms bravery and self-assertion into acts of racial solidarity in poems like "I Am Not Proud."

=== Classism ===
Class hierarchies, particularly those ingrained throughout modern urban life and the literary elite, are frequently criticized in Johnson's poetry.

==== Democracy amongst the working class ====
Harlem is portrayed in Johnson's early poems "Fulfillment," "Poem," and "Futility" as a democratic, working-class neighborhood full of opportunity, community, and vibrancy. As noted by Rutter, Johnson enjoys the "joy and hurry" of crowded trolleys, street entertainers, and regular laborers and identifies with "the African American bourgeoisie"

==== Elitism ====
Johnson specifically addresses class privilege in his later poems. She ties herself to the privileged few who run cultural institutions in "The Street to the Establishment," saying, "I'm the multi". According to Rutter, Johnson reveals how Black women writers, like herself, faced exclusion by American male privilege and class elitism.

== Legacy and reception ==
As an integral figure in Black feminist modernism and the cultural politics of the 1920s and 1930s, Johnson is today acknowledged as a notable poet of the Harlem Renaissance. Her creative style, appreciation of Black urban life, and sharp criticism of racism, misogyny, and classism are what make her work invaluable.

After a long and quiet life, Helene Johnson died on July 6, 1995, in Manhattan.

=== Awards and honors ===
1. National Urban League's Inaugural Poetry Contest (1925): Johnson received her first award for poetry alongside multiple honorable mentions.
2. Opportunity Publications (1925–1926): 6 poems published
3. Appearances in Anthology Collections: Works in Alain Locke's The New Negro and James Weldon Johnson's The Book of American Negro Poetry

=== Critical reception ===
==== Early reception ====
Johnson's career was cut short by the Depression and dwindling chances for Black women writers, despite the fact that she was admired by her peers and published in prominent Black magazines and newspapers.

==== Mid-20th century outcast ====
Johnson had virtually vanished from literary history by the 1940s and 1990s. She was written off by critics like Roses and Randolph (1990) as a "minor poet" who "never ventured further."

==== Contemporary reassessment ====
Johnson "continued to revise and rework the rhetoric of empowerment" long after 1935, according to Rutter, who claims that Johnson's late poems show a persistent, changing critique of racial, gender, and class oppression.

Fillman emphasizes her proficiency in both conventional and avant-garde styles as well as her ongoing interest in racial politics, women's subjugation, and working-class issues.

Yanota places Johnson in the context of the New Negro movement's cultural nationalist endeavor, demonstrating how Black women poets were able to challenge male-dominated racial discourse through her use of the musical form of poetry.
