= Dorothy West =

American novelist (1907–1998)

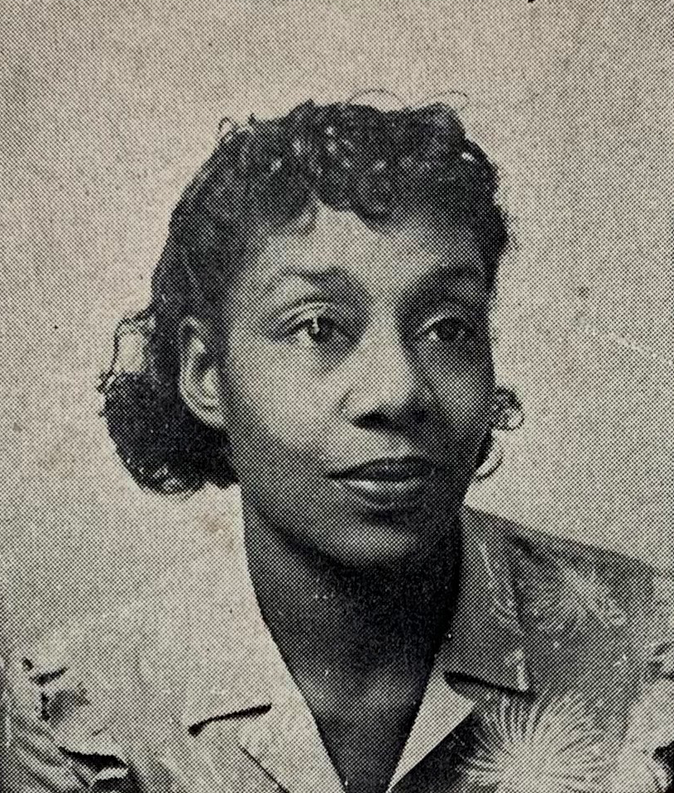
- West c. 1948
- Born: June 2, 1907; Boston, Massachusetts, United States
- Died: August 16, 1998 (aged 91); Boston, Massachusetts, United States
- Occupations: Novelist; short-story writer; columnist
- Parent(s): Rachel Benson and Isaac Christopher West
- Relatives: Helene Johnson (cousin)
- Writing career
- Notable works: The Living Is Easy (1948); The Wedding (1995)

Dorothy West (June 2, 1907 – August 16, 1998) was an American novelist, short-story writer, and magazine editor associated with the Harlem Renaissance, a cultural movement in the 1920s and 1930s that celebrated black art, literature, and music. She was one of the few Black women writers to be published in major literary magazines in the 1930s and 1940s.

West is best known for her 1948 novel The Living Is Easy, about the life of an upper-class black family and their attempts to climb the social ladder. She also explored the complexities of the black experience in the United States in short stories and essays that challenged stereotypes and explored themes such as race, class, and gender.

== Early life and education ==
Dorothy West was born on June 2, 1907, in Boston, Massachusetts, the daughter of Rachel Benson, one of 22 children, and Isaac Christopher West, a former slave who became a successful businessman. At the age of seven, Dorothy's father gained his freedom and by the time he was 10 years old, he had saved enough money in a cigar box to establish his own business. When Dorothy was born, her family was already the most affluent black household in Boston, thanks to Isaac West's ownership of a wholesale fruit company, which earned him the nickname "Black Banana King" of Boston. Her mother was from Camden, South Carolina.

The poet Helene Johnson was West's cousin. Late in life, West wrote that Blacks in Boston "were taught very young to take the white man in stride or drown in their own despair." She detailed how her mother guided her and her many cousins, all with varied skin tones, into the inhospitable world:

"We were always stared at. Whenever we went outside the neighborhood that knew us, we were inspected like specimens under glass. My mother prepared us. As she marched us down our front stairs, she would say what our smiles were on tiptoe to hear, 'Come on, children, let's go out and drive the white folks crazy.' She said it without rancor, and she said it in that outrageous way to make us laugh. She was easing our entry into a world that outranked and outnumbered us. If she could not help us see ourselves with the humor, however wry, that gives the heart its grace, she would never have forgiven herself for letting our spirits be crushed before we had learned to sheathe them with pride."

== Career ==
West began her writing career as a teenager, publishing stories in The Boston Post and the Boston Chronicle. West reportedly wrote her first story at the age of seven. Her first published work, a short story entitled "Promise and Fulfillment" appeared in The Boston Post when she was 14 years old.

As a child, West reportedly became interested in writing after seeing an advertisement for a writing contest in the magazine Crisis, which was published by the NAACP. Her mother, seeking to protect her daughter from the news in the magazine, inadvertently inspired West to pursue her passion for writing. West won several local writing competitions and eventually attended Girls' Latin School (now called Boston Latin Academy), from which she graduated at the age of 16. She went on to study at Boston University and at the Columbia University School of Journalism.

In 1926, West tied for second place in a writing contest sponsored by Opportunity, a journal published by the National Urban League, with her short story "The Typewriter". She tied with future novelist Zora Neale Hurston. "The Typewriter” appeared in Dodd Mead's annual anthology The Best Short Stories of 1926 alongside work by Ernest Hemingway, Ring Lardner, and Robert Sherwood.

Between 1928 and 1930, some of West's other early writings were published in the Saturday Evening Quill, a short-lived annual literary magazine that grew out of a literary club of the same name, of which West was a founding member.

== Actress ==
West took a break from writing to pursue acting for a few years. In 1927, she applied for a playwright role in the production of Dorothy and DuBose Heyward's play Porgy but was offered a small acting part instead. The play ran for three months in London, where West traveled with the production in 1929. In June 1932, she joined other Harlem Renaissance intellectuals on a trip to the Soviet Union to film Black and White, a film about racism in the United States. Although the film project was cancelled shortly before their arrival, West decided to stay in the Soviet Union for a year, returning home only after her father's death.

The film provided material for a 1985 essay that described her encounter with the film director Sergei Eisenstein. The film was abandoned by the Soviets, and she returned to the United States after a year when she learned of the death of her father.

== Harlem Renaissance ==
Shortly before winning the Opportunity writing contest, West moved to Harlem with her cousin, the poet Helene Johnson. She became involved in the Harlem Renaissance in the 1920s and was a member of the literary and artistic community centered on the Harlem Writers Guild. There, West met other writers of the Harlem Renaissance, including Langston Hughes, Countee Cullen, and Wallace Thurman.

During the Great Depression, West's principal contribution to the Harlem Renaissance was to publish the magazine Challenge, which she founded with $40 in 1934, the final issue of six being published in spring 1937. In 1934, she returned to Harlem and began writing again. She was mentored by Carl Van Vechten, a white writer associated with the Harlem Renaissance.

Having given up on Challenge, in an effort to provide a platform for young black artists, she tried writing again with the more radical New Challenge, co-edited with Richard Wright, its the single issue containing writing by Ralph Ellison as well as Wright's "combative and influential essay 'Blueprint for Negro Writing,' which urged black artists to reject white artistic standards and draw inspiration instead from their own racial heritage."

From 1938 to the early 1940s, she worked as a welfare investigator in Harlem, and then became a regular contributor to the New York Daily News. In 1945, West relocated to Martha's Vineyard, where she had many childhood memories. There, she began writing her novel, The Living is Easy, which was published in 1948. West's written works, including novels, short stories, and periodicals, addressed issues surrounding African-American life and black political and social matters. Her writing was influenced by her experiences with racism during her schooling and work in Harlem, as well as her time spent acting overseas.

In the 1930s and 1940s, West's short stories were published in magazines such as Opportunity and The Crisis, and she became a regular contributor to The New Yorker. Her first novel, The Living Is Easy, was published in 1948 and was based on her experiences growing up in a middle-class Black family in Boston.

In 1995, West released her second novel, The Wedding, almost fifty years after her first novel was published. The Wedding explores themes of race, class, and gender in a multiracial society and was adapted into a two-part miniseries by Oprah Winfrey in 1998.

West was quoted as saying, in 1995: "we didn't know it was the Harlem Reinassance, because we were all young and all poor." Hughes, then, gave West the nickname of "The Kid", by which she was known during her time in Harlem.

== Novelist and journalist ==
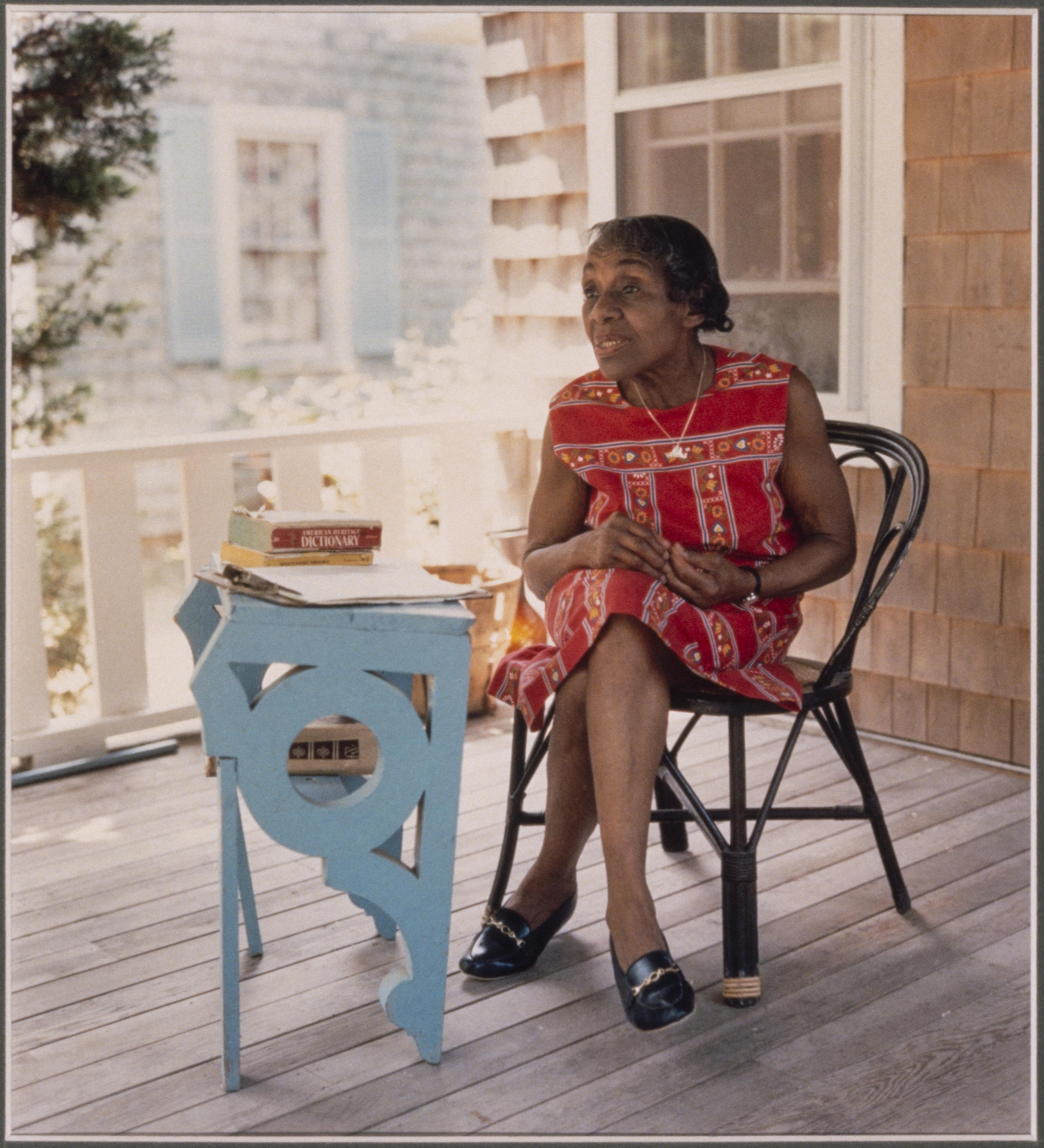
West in 1981

After struggling as a magazine publisher, West found secure employment with the Federal Writers' Project until the mid-1940s. During this time, she wrote a number of short stories for the New York Daily News, becoming the first black writer to publish work in that newspaper. In 1947, she moved to her family's home in Oak Bluffs on Martha's Vineyard, where she had previously spent summers. There she wrote her first novel, The Living Is Easy. Featuring an ironic sense of humor unique to West's style, the story chronicles the life of a southern woman in pursuit of an upper-class lifestyle in Boston. One 21st-century assessment said it "satirizes the Black bourgeoisie". Published in 1948, the novel was well received critically but did not sell many copies. In The New York Times, literary critic Seymour Krim described it as "a housewifey novel: a look at life from the kitchen and the parlor", focused on characters who were women first and secondarily Black. He wrote: "The important thing about the book is its abundant and special woman's energy and beat. The beat is a deep one and it often makes a man's seem puny."

For the next four decades, West worked as a journalist, primarily writing for a small newspaper on Martha's Vineyard. In 1948, she started a weekly column about Oak Bluffs people, events, and nature. In 1982, The Feminist Press brought The Living Is Easy back into print, giving new attention to West and her role in the Harlem Renaissance, and she was included in the 1992 anthology Daughters of Africa (edited by Margaret Busby). As a result of this renewed attention, at the age of 85 West finally finished a second novel, entitled The Wedding. Although its action occurs in the course of a weekend on Martha's Vineyard, The Wedding recounts the history of an affluent Black family over the course of centuries. West dedicated it to Jacqueline Kennedy Onassis, who as an editor at West's publisher, Doubleday, had encouraged her to complete it.

The Wedding was published to acclaim in 1995, with the Publishers Weekly review stating: "West's first novel in 45 years is a triumph." Set on Martha's Vineyard, it related the multigenerational tale of a well-to-do African-American family, and as with much of West's writings, provided a somewhat satirical look at affluent blacks and related social and racial issues. The New York Times reviewer advised the reader to look past West's "weakness for melodrama" in a few instances and enjoy her "naturalist's ear and eye for detail, an unsentimental view of human failings and a clear, crisp narrative style". Oprah Winfrey's production company turned the novel into two-part television miniseries, The Wedding in 1998.

The success of The Wedding was followed by the publication of a collection of West's short stories and reminiscences called The Richer, the Poorer (1995), its 30 selections including 11 pieces not published before.

== Love life ==
Countee Cullen once proposed to West because his father thought it would end his homosexuality. After their trip to Russia, she offered a marriage proposal in writing to Langston Hughes, who declined. She had a longtime personal and professional relationship with writer Marian Minus.

== Last years and death ==
Documentary filmmaker Salem Mekuria used West as one of the principal sources for her half-hour study of the Black community on Martha's Vineyard, Our Place in the Sun (1988), and then created a biographical study entitled As I Remember It: A Portrait of Dorothy West (1991). Both received Emmy nominations.

After her re-emergence as a writer, she was a celebrated figure on the Vineyard. Guests at her 90th birthday party included Henry Louis Gates Jr., Anita Hill, Jessye Norman and Charles Ogletree.

Two years before she died, West won an Anisfield-Wolf Book Award for Lifetime Achievement.

West died on August 16, 1998, aged 91, at the New England Medical Center in Boston. Though her cause of death was never officially released, it is thought to have been from natural causes. At her death, she was one of the last surviving members of the Harlem Renaissance. When asked what she wanted her legacy to be, she responded: "That I hung in there. That I didn't say I can't."

== Selected writings ==
- The Living Is Easy. Houghton Mifflin Company. 1948; reissued by The Feminist Press, 1982
- The Wedding. Doubleday Books. 1995. ISBN 978-0-385-47143-5.
- The Richer, The Poorer: Stories, Sketches, and Reminiscences. Knopf Doubleday Publishing Group. 1995. ISBN 978-0385471466.
- Saunders, James Robert; Shackelford, Renae Nadine, eds. (2001). The Dorothy West Martha's Vineyard: Stories, Essays and Reminiscences by Dorothy West Writing in the Vineyard Gazette.
- Mitchell, Verner D.; Davis, Cynthia, eds. (2004). Where the Wild Grape Grows: Selected Writings, 1930–1950. University of Massachusetts Press. ISBN 9781558494718.
- Bascom, Lionel C., ed. (2008). The Last Leaf of Harlem: Selected and Newly Discovered Fiction by the Author of The Wedding. St. Martin's Press. ISBN 978-0312261481.

== Papers ==
- Various collections at Yale University
- Mugar Memorial Library, Boston University
- "Papers of Dorothy West". Schlesinger Library. Harvard University.
- "Dorothy West Digital Collection". Schlesinger Library. Harvard University. Archived from the original on January 30, 2021.

== See also ==
- African-American literature
