= Gary American =

African-American newspaper in Indiana

The Gary American was a newspaper that operated from the 1920s to the 1990s in Gary, Indiana, serving the African American community of that city. It was known for its strong stance in favor of civil rights, and its strong support of the Democratic Party.

Founded in 1927 as the Gary Colored American, for its first three decades the American was owned and operated by the Whitlock family. The American was a weekly for most of its history, became a biweekly in the 1980s and ceased publication in the late 20th century.

At the outset, the American covered only national and local Gary news. In the 1940s, however, it widened its geographic scope to incorporate a regular column on the African-American community in neighboring East Chicago.

== History ==
In 1927, Arthur B. Whitlock, David E. Taylor, and Chauncey Townsend headed the formation of the Gary American Publishing Company in Gary, Indiana. A.B. Whitlock, who in 1921 had become the first African-American member of the Gary City Council, published the first issue of the Gary Colored American on November 10, with Townsend as editor and Whitlock acting as manager.

In 1928, the Gary Colored American changed its name to the Gary American, becoming one of Gary's most prominent African American newspapers. While initial circulation numbers are unavailable, the American claimed in 1928 a readership of nearly 2,000 readers. In 1929, its masthead asserted that the American was an "independent paper" devoted to African American interests in Northern Indiana. In the 1920s and 1930s, its reporters highlighted the increase of lynchings across the U.S., the struggle of integrating Marquette Beach, and labor concerns regarding the United Steel Workers at Gary Steel.

From 1934 to 1936, Black attorney Fritz Alexander served as editor until Arthur B. Whitlock regained control, and he left the company once again in 1938. Attorney F. Louis Sperling was elected editor and acting manager. Between November 1938 and February 1939, Wallace L. Johnson served as editor before being charged with embezzling the institution's funds, leading to A. B. Whitlock to regain control over the Gary American Publishing Company.

The Gary American stayed within the Whitlock family for the next seventeen years, with Henry O. Whitlock becoming manager in 1944 and his wife, Edwina, becoming editor in 1947. Henry Oliver Whitlock died of a heart attack on May 5, 1960, and Edwina Whitlock operated the paper for a year thereafter.

In 1961, Edwina Whitlock sold the American to a group of three purchasers, including James T. Harris Jr. and Fred Harris, both of whom would serve in turn as managers of the paper. Under their leadership, the American expanded its circulation to East Chicago, reaching approximately 9,000 readers.

From the 1960s until its closure, the Gary American was one of three African-American newspapers serving the city of Gary (together with the Gary Crusader and Gary Info), a uniquely large number among American cities. For some of this period the city was also served by a special Gary edition of the Chicago Defender.

By the 1980s, the Gary American published only once every two weeks. The Gary Info, a competing paper that James T. Harris Jr. founded in 1963, absorbed the Gary American in the late 20th century.

== Impact ==
The Urban League had documented evidence of racial injustice in numerous reports; the Interdenominational Ministerial Alliance had drawn attention to the injustices; the NAACP had demonstrated against segregated public facilities; and the Gary American had brought these social issues to the attention of the black community.

The Gary Colored American led reporting on the 1927 Emerson School Walkout, when white students and parents protested the integration of six African American students into the school. In response, Colored American reporters advocated for the construction of Roosevelt High School to serve Gary's African American children.

The American brought attention to many crucial public issues, including the fight against police brutality and the struggle to integrate Gary's only public beach at Marquette Park, which continued until at least 1951. It heralded Gary's adoption of a fair employment practices ordinance in 1950, the first city ordinance of its kind. It also covered the African-American struggle within the United Steel Workers union at the Gary Works. It also chronicled important gains by the city's African-American community, including the first African-American recipient of a taxi license in 1945, and the first African-American appointee to the Gary School Board in 1949. Edwina Whitlock published her own column, "First Person Singular," for many years, addressing a variety of women's issues, such as education, race relations, and domestic life. Throughout Whitlock's leadership, the American heavily focused on the emerging local activism within the community by exposing discriminatory funding within Gary's public education system as well as following the local boycott against Kroger Stores for refusing to hire African American employees.

In addition to these local battles, the American also provided close coverage of the national U.S. civil rights movement. After F. Louis Sperling was elected editor and acting manager, his legal influence filtered through as the American released articles on monumental rulings in the U.S. criminal justice system such as the Scottsboro Boys trials, the Anti-Lynching Bill of 1937, and the effects of President Roosevelt's New Deal on African American jobs, in addition to heralding such developments as the Brown v. Board of Education decision in 1954, and the Greensboro sit-ins of 1960.

Although founder A.B. Whitlock had been a Republican, over time the American became increasingly tied to the Democratic Party, although it endorsed some Republicans for office even after World War II.

Following the election of Richard Hatcher as mayor of Gary in 1967, the American focused increasingly on community revitalization efforts.

== See also ==
- Gary Crusader
- Frank Marshall Davis

== Works cited ==
- Bigham, Darrel E. (1996). "The Black Press in Indiana, 1879-1985". In Suggs, Henry Lewis (ed.). The Black Press in the Middle West, 1865-1985. Greenwood Press. ISBN 9780313255793.
- Lane, James B. (1978). City of the Century: A History of Gary, Indiana. Indiana University Press. ISBN 9780253111876.
- Millender, Dharathula H. (2003). Gary's Central Business Community.
- Mohl, Raymond Allen (1986). Steel City: Urban and Ethnic Patterns in Gary, Indiana, 1906-1950. ISBN 9780841910102.
- Needleman, Ruth (2003). Black Freedom Fighters in Steel. ISBN 9780801488580.
- Walker, Juliet E.K. (1996). "The Promised Land: The Chicago Defender and the Black Press in Illinois, 1862-1970". In Suggs, Henry Lewis (ed.). The Black Press in the Middle West, 1865-1985. Greenwood Press. ISBN 9780313255793.
