= South Side Community Art Center =

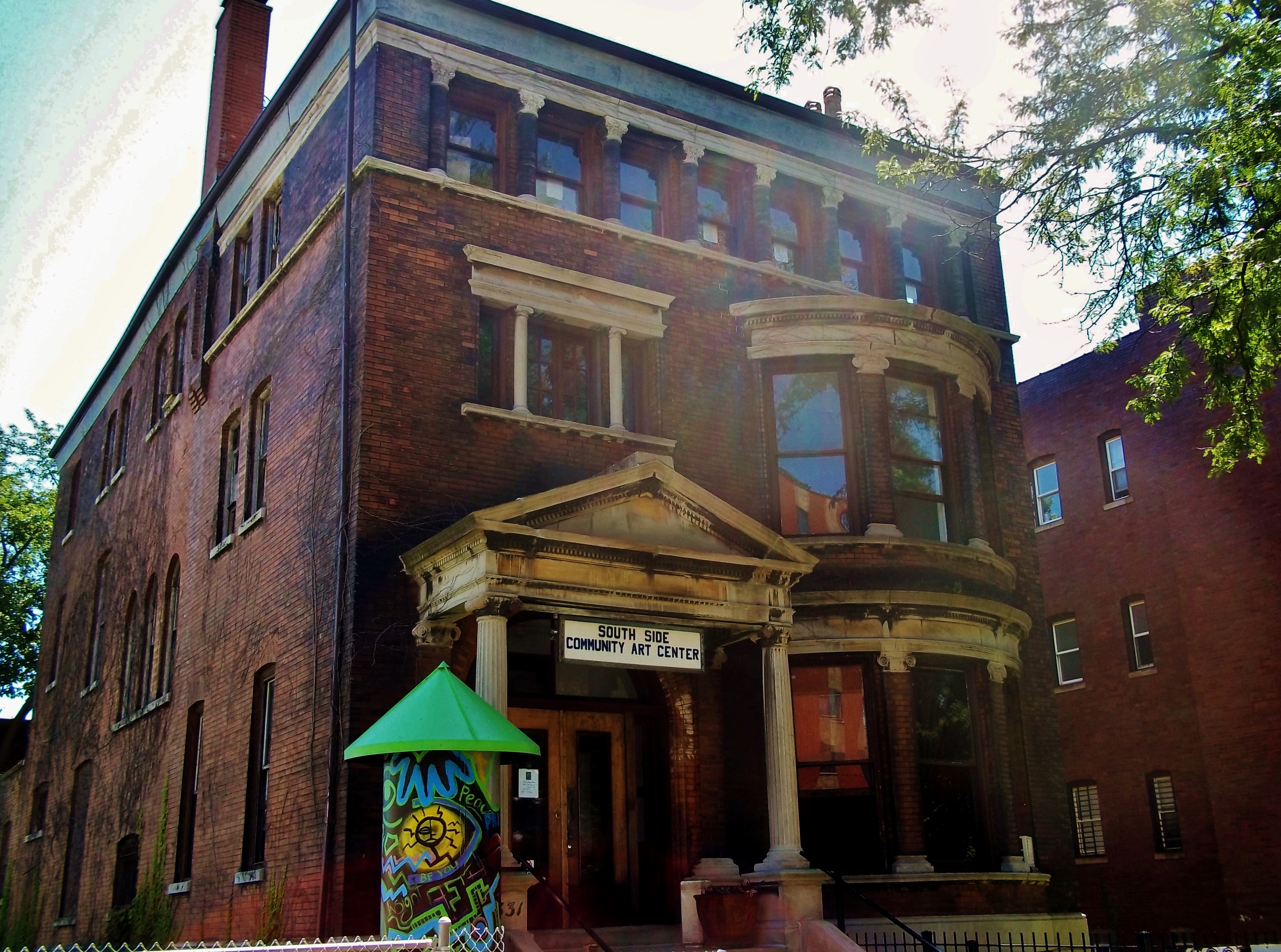
- South Side Community Art Center in Bronzeville, Chicago, IL
- Established: 1940
- Location: 3831 South Michigan Avenue
- Coordinates: 41.8246°N 87.6231°W

The South Side Community Art Center is a community art center in Chicago that opened in 1940 with support from the Works Progress Administration's Federal Art Project in Illinois. Opened in an 1893 mansion in Bronzeville, it became the first black art museum in the United States not affiliated with a historically Black college and has been an important center for developing Chicago's African American artists. Of more than 100 community art centers established by the WPA, this is the only one that remains open.

The center was awarded Chicago Landmark status in 1994. Named a "National Treasure" by the National Trust for Historic Preservation in 2017, it was listed on the National Register of Historic Places in 2018.

== History ==
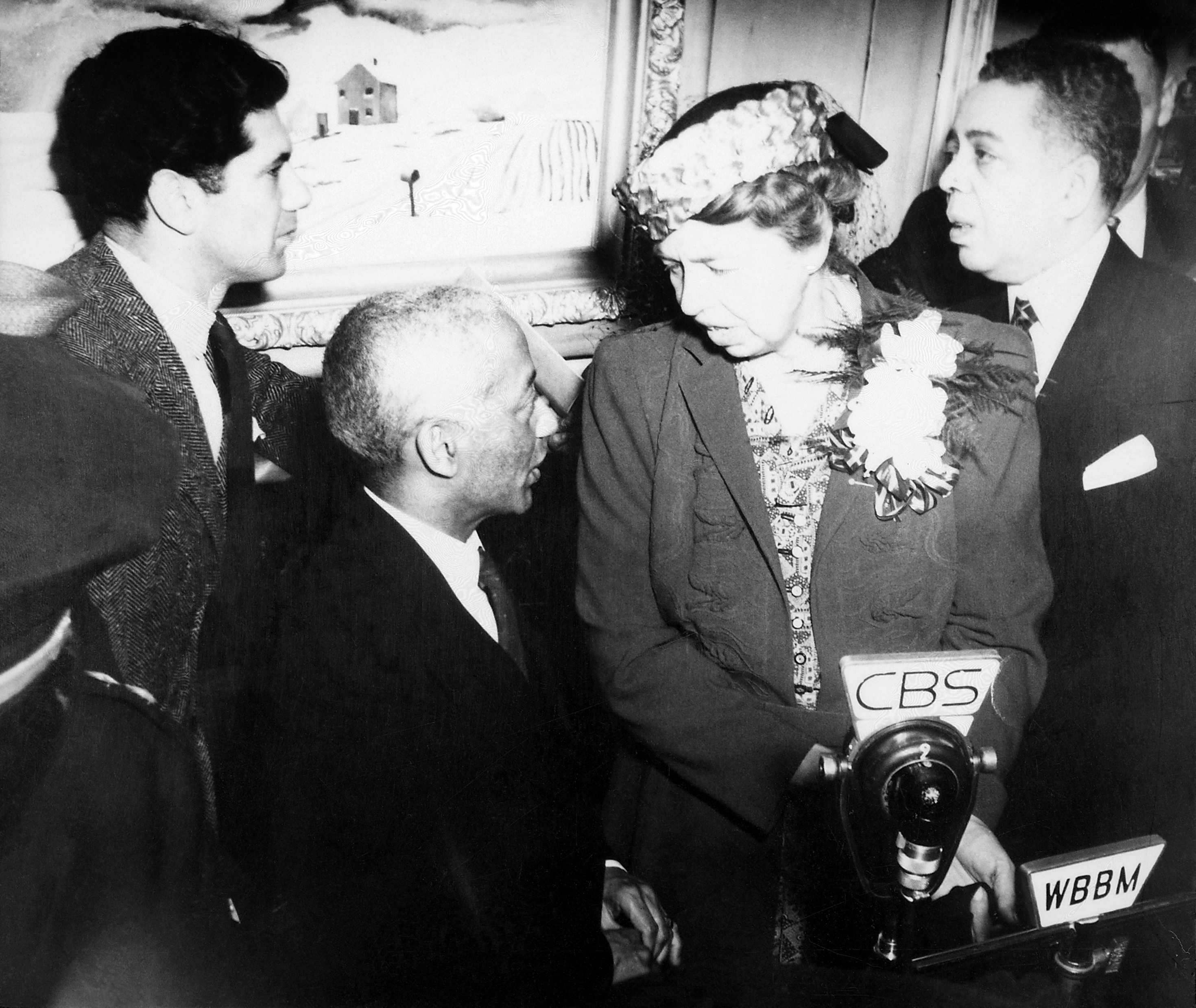
Eleanor Roosevelt at the dedication of South Side Community Art Center (May 7, 1941)

Efforts to open a community art center on Chicago's South Side began in 1938. Peter Pollack, a Federal Art Project official, contacted Metz Lochard, an editor at the Chicago Defender, about having the Art Project sponsor exhibitions of African American artists, who often had trouble securing space to display their work. Pollack, an art dealer, owned a gallery on Michigan Avenue in Chicago's Loop and had previously shown the work of African American artists. Lochard arranged a meeting between Pollack and Pauline Kigh Reed, a social worker with extensive connections in the community, and, according to Reed's recollection, she suggested founding an art center. Reed helped arrange an initial meeting with area artists at the South Side Settlement House at 32nd Street and Wabash Avenue. Businessman Golden Darby, chairman of the board of the Settlement House, became chair of the Sponsoring Committee of the proposed South Side Community Art Center.

Darby chaired the first official meeting of the Sponsoring Committee on October 25, 1938, at the offices of the Chicago Urban League. In addition to Darby, Pollack, and other organizers of the Sponsoring Committee, the meeting was attended by members of the Arts Crafts Guild, a group of Chicago-based African American artists organized in 1932 which included Margaret Taylor-Burroughs, Eldzier Cortor, Bernard Goss, Charles White, William Carter, Joseph Kersey, and Archibald Motley Jr. George G. Thorpe, the State Director of the Federal Art Project of Illinois, informed the group that the FAP's community art center program would provide an administrative staff, faculty, and renovation funds for a center if the community could raise funds for the purchase of a building and the costs of utilities and supplies.

The following year was spent organizing and raising funds for the center, with efforts ranging from membership drives and street corner collections (including Margaret Burroughs's famous "Mile of Dimes" on South Parkway, (now Martin Luther King Drive) to benefit parties and lectures by speakers including Augusta Savage. The most successful of these events, the Artists' and Models' Ball held at the Savoy Ballroom on October 23, 1939, became an annual tradition.

Its alumni are Charles White, Bernard Goss, George Neal, Eldzier Cortor, Gordon Parks, Archibald Motley, Richard Hunt, and Margaret Burroughs.

=== Building ===
Completed in 1893 at 3831 S. Michigan Avenue, the Georgian Revival-style building designed by architect L. Gustav Hallberg initially served as a residence for grain merchant George A. Seaverns Jr.

In 1940, the by then vacant brownstone building was selected as the site for the planned community art center and was purchased for about $8,000 with funds raised by the community. The building is sometimes referred to as the Comiskey Mansion, and it was described as the former home of Charles Comiskey by Eleanor Roosevelt in her newspaper column after she took part in the dedication of the South Side Community Art Center. According to UNCAP, the Uncovering New Chicago Archives Project, the house belonging to Comiskey was further south on Michigan Avenue. The community paid for the lease and purchase of the building, for utilities, and for art supplies. The federal government helped to stimulate the establishment of the center via support from the Works Progress Administration's Federal Art Project. They provided administrative funds for staff and faculty and funds for the remodeling of the building. The interior was remodeled in the New Bauhaus-style by Hin Bredendieck and Nathan Lerner and the centre opened unofficially for its first classes on December 15, 1940. The opening was accompanied by an inaugural exhibition of paintings by local black artists including Charles Davis, Charles White, Bernard Goss, William Carter, Eldzier Cortor, Charles Sebree, Archibald Motley Jr., amongst others. The interracial faculty of art instructors included Davis, White, Goss, Carter, Morris Topchevsky, Si Gordon, Max Kahn, and Todros Geller. Lessons were free and included oil painting, drawing, composition, water color, sculpture, lithography, poster design, fashion illustration, interior decoration, silk screen, weaving, and hooked rug-making. By March 1941, 13,500 people had attended classes, exhibitions, and events at the center. First Lady Eleanor Roosevelt dedicated the facility May 7, 1941, in a ceremony that broadcast nationwide on CBS Radio.

A planned expansion building and plaza at the rear and in the adjoining north lot, and refurbishment, was announced for the Center in 2025.

==== Landmark status ====
The center earned Chicago Landmark status on June 16, 1994. In 2017, the National Trust for Historic Preservation named it "National Treasure." The building was listed on the National Register of Historic Places in 2018.
