= Cherene Sherrard Johnson =

American English scholar

Cherene Sherrard Johnson is an American scholar, whose research focuses on the representation of Black women in American literature and visual culture from the mid-19th century to the early 20th century. She is the E. Wilson Lyon Professor of the Humanities at Pomona College in Claremont, California.

== Career ==
In July 2022, she was appointed the E. Wilson Lyon Professor of the Humanities, an endowed chair at Pomona College.
