= Margaret Taylor-Burroughs =

American writer, artist and educator (1915–2010)

Margaret Burroughs
- Taylor-Burroughs in 2006
- Born: Victoria Margaret Taylor; November 1, 1915; St. Rose, Louisiana, U.S.
- Died: November 21, 2010 (aged 93); Chicago, Illinois, U.S.
- Education: Englewood High School; now Englewood Technical Prep Academy, Chicago; Chicago Teachers College; now Chicago State University; School of the Art Institute of Chicago (B.A.), (M.A.)
- Organizations: South Side Community Art Center; DuSable Museum of African American History
- Spouses: Bernard Goss; Charles Gordon Burroughs
- Children: 2
- Awards: President's Humanitarian Award (President Gerald Ford), 1975; Women's Caucus for Art Lifetime Achievement Award, 1988; Paul Robeson Award, 1989; Art Institute of Chicago's Legends and Legacy Award, 2010

Margaret Taylor-Burroughs (November 1, 1915^{[a]} – November 21, 2010), also known as Margaret Taylor Goss, Margaret Taylor Goss Burroughs or Margaret T G Burroughs, was an American visual artist, writer, poet, educator, and arts organizer. She co-founded the Ebony Museum of Chicago, now the DuSable Museum of African American History.

An active member of the African-American community, she also helped to establish the South Side Community Art Center, whose opening on May 1, 1941 was dedicated by the first lady of the United States Eleanor Roosevelt. There, at the age of 23, Burroughs served as the youngest member of its board of directors. A long-time educator, she spent most of her career at DuSable High School.

Taylor-Burroughs was a prolific writer, with her efforts directed toward the exploration of the Black experience and toward children, especially to their appreciation of their cultural identity and to their introduction and growing awareness of art. She is also credited with the founding of Chicago's Lake Meadows Art Fair in the early 1950s.

== Early life and education ==
Burroughs was born Victoria Margaret Taylor in St. Rose, Louisiana, where her father worked as a farmer and laborer at a railroad warehouse. She was raised there as a Catholic.

The family moved to Chicago in 1920 when she was five years old. There she attended Englewood High School along with Gwendolyn Brooks, who in 1985-1986 served as consultant in poetry to the Library of Congress (now United States Poet Laureate). As classmates, the two joined the NAACP Youth Council. Burroughs earned her teacher's certificates from Chicago Teachers College in 1937. She helped found the South Side Community Arts Center in 1939 to serve as a social center, gallery, and studio to showcase African American artists. In 1946, Taylor-Burroughs earned a Bachelor of Arts degree in art education from the School of the Art Institute of Chicago where she also earned her Master of Arts degree in art education, in 1948.

== Personal life ==
Taylor-Burroughs married the artist Bernard Goss (1913–1966), in 1939, and they divorced in 1947. In 1949, she married the poet Charles Gordon Burroughs and they remained married until his death in 1994.

== Career ==
Taylor-Burroughs taught at DuSable High School on Chicago's south side from 1946 to 1969, and from 1969 to 1979 was a professor of humanities at Kennedy-King College, a community college in Chicago. She also taught African American art and culture at Elmhurst College in 1968. She was named Chicago park district commissioner by Harold Washington in 1985, a position she held until 2010. Margaret Burroughs is the recipient of an honorary doctorate, as well as the President's Humanitarian Award (1975).

At age 22, she helped found the South Side Community Art Center, the first Black museum in the United States, in 1941.

== Career as an artist ==
Dr. Margaret Taylor Burroughs exhibited her art with the American Negro Exposition (Chicago, 1940), as well as Atlanta University (1943-1945), and the San Francisco Civic Museum (1949).

Burroughs created many of her own works of art as well. In one of her linocuts, Birthday Party, both Black and white children are seen celebrating. The Black and white children are not isolated from each other; instead they are intermixed and mingling around the table together waiting for a birthday cake. An article published by The Art Institute of Chicago described Burroughs' Birthday Party and said: "Through her career, as both a visual artist and a writer, she has often chosen themes concerning family, community, and history. 'Art is communication,' she has said. 'I wish my art to speak not only for my people - but for all humanity.' This aim is achieved in Birthday Party, in which both black and white children dance, while mothers cut cake in a quintessential image of neighbors and family enjoying a special day together." The painting puts in visual form Burroughs' philosophy that "the color of skin is a minor difference among men which has been stretched beyond its importance."

In many of Burroughs' pieces, she depicts people with half black and half white faces. In The Faces of My People, Burroughs carved five people staring at the viewer. One of the women is all black, three of the people are half black and half white and one is mostly white. While Burroughs is attempting to blend together the Black and white communities, she also shows the barriers that stop the communities from uniting. None of the people in The Faces of My People are looking at each other, and this implies a sense of disconnect among them. On another level, The Faces of My People deals with diversity. An article from the Collector magazine website describes Burroughs' attempts to unify in the picture. The article says, "Burroughs sees her art as a catalyst for bringing people together. This tableau of diverse individuals illustrates her commitment to mutual respect and understanding."

Burroughs once again depicts faces that are half black and half white in My People. Even though the title is similar to the previously referenced piece, the woodcut has some differences. In this scene, there are four different faces – each of which is half white and half black. The head on the far left is tilted to the side and close to the head next to it. It seems as both heads are coming out of the same body – taking the idea of split personalities to the extreme. The women are all very close together, suggesting that they relate to each other. In The Faces of My People, there were others pictured with different skin tones, but in My People all of the people have the same half black and half white split. Therefore, My People focuses on a common conflict that all the women in the picture face.

Artwork	Medium	Date	Collection
Still Life	Oil on compressed particle board	1943	Corcoran Collection
Sleeping Boy	Linocut	1953	Reba and Dave Williams Collection
Black Venus	Linocut	1957	Reba and Dave Williams Collection
On the Beach	Linocut	1957	Reba and Dave Williams Collection
Abstraction	Linocut on paper	ca. 1962	The Johnson Collection
African Odalisque	Lithograph on paper	1984	The Johnson Collection
Hop Scotch	Linocut on paper	1991	The Johnson Collection
Bill Broonzy- Me Folk Singer	Linocut on paper	2006	The Johnson Collection
Woman	Ink on paper	2006	DuSable Collection

== Legacy ==
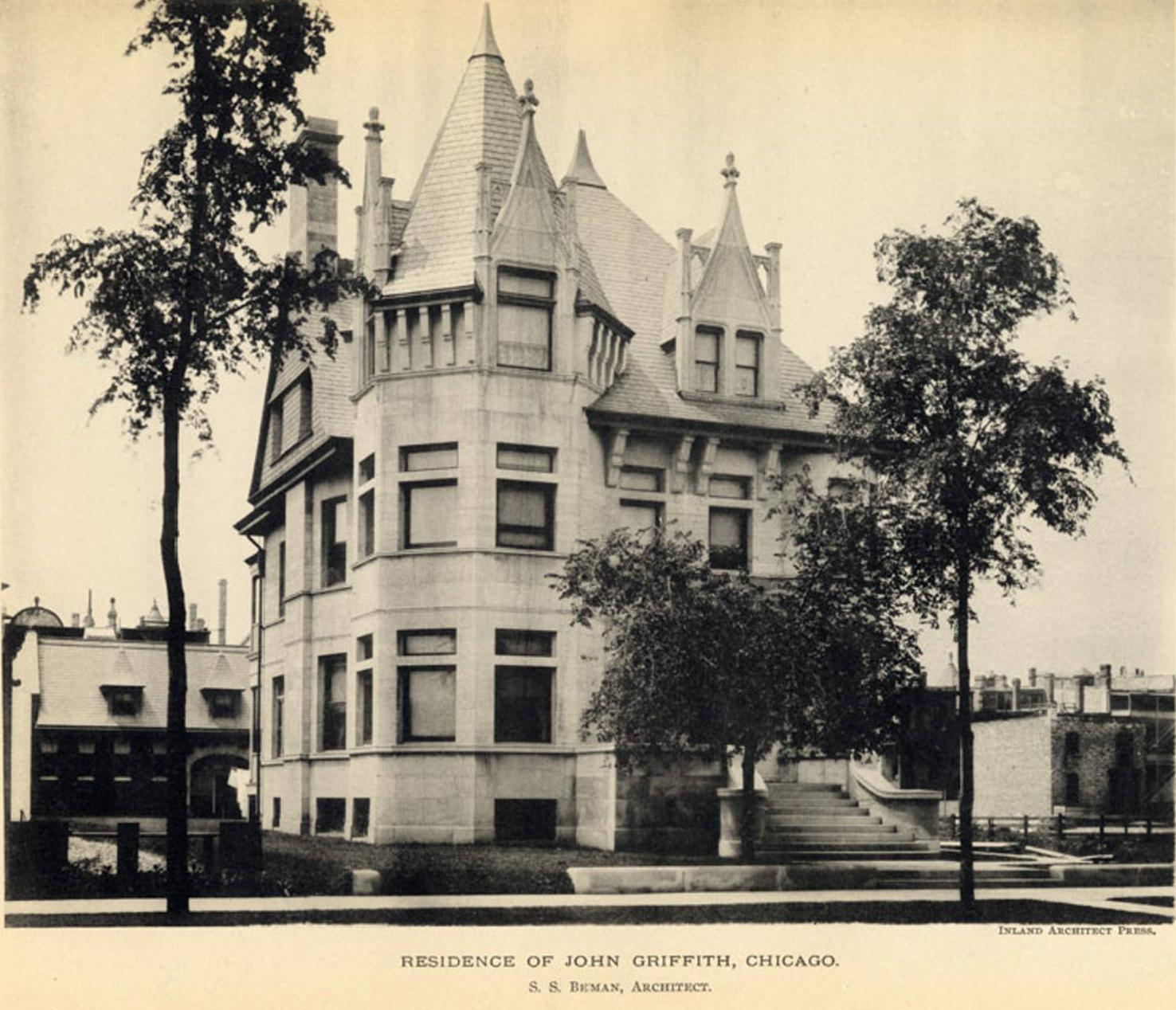
The first home of the DuSable Museum of African American History was located in this house, built for Chicago contractor John W. Griffiths in 1892 and purchased by Charles and Margaret Burroughs in 1959, who opened part of their home for the public museum

Margaret and her husband Charles co-founded what is now the DuSable Museum of African American History in Chicago in 1961. The institution was originally known as the Ebony Museum of Negro History and Art and made its debut in the living room of their house at 3806 S. Michigan Avenue in the Bronzeville neighborhood on Chicago's south side, and Taylor-Burroughs served as its first Executive Director. She was proud of the institution's grass-roots beginnings: "We're the only one that grew out of the Indigenous Black community. We weren't started by anybody downtown; we were started by ordinary folks." Burroughs served as executive director until she retired in 1985 and was then named director emeritus, remaining active in the museum's operations and fundraising efforts.

The museum moved to its current location at 740 E. 56th Place in Washington Park in 1973, and today is the oldest museum of Black culture in the United States. Both the current museum building, and the Burroughs' S. Michigan Avenue home are now listed on the National Register of Historic Places, and the house is a designated Chicago landmark.

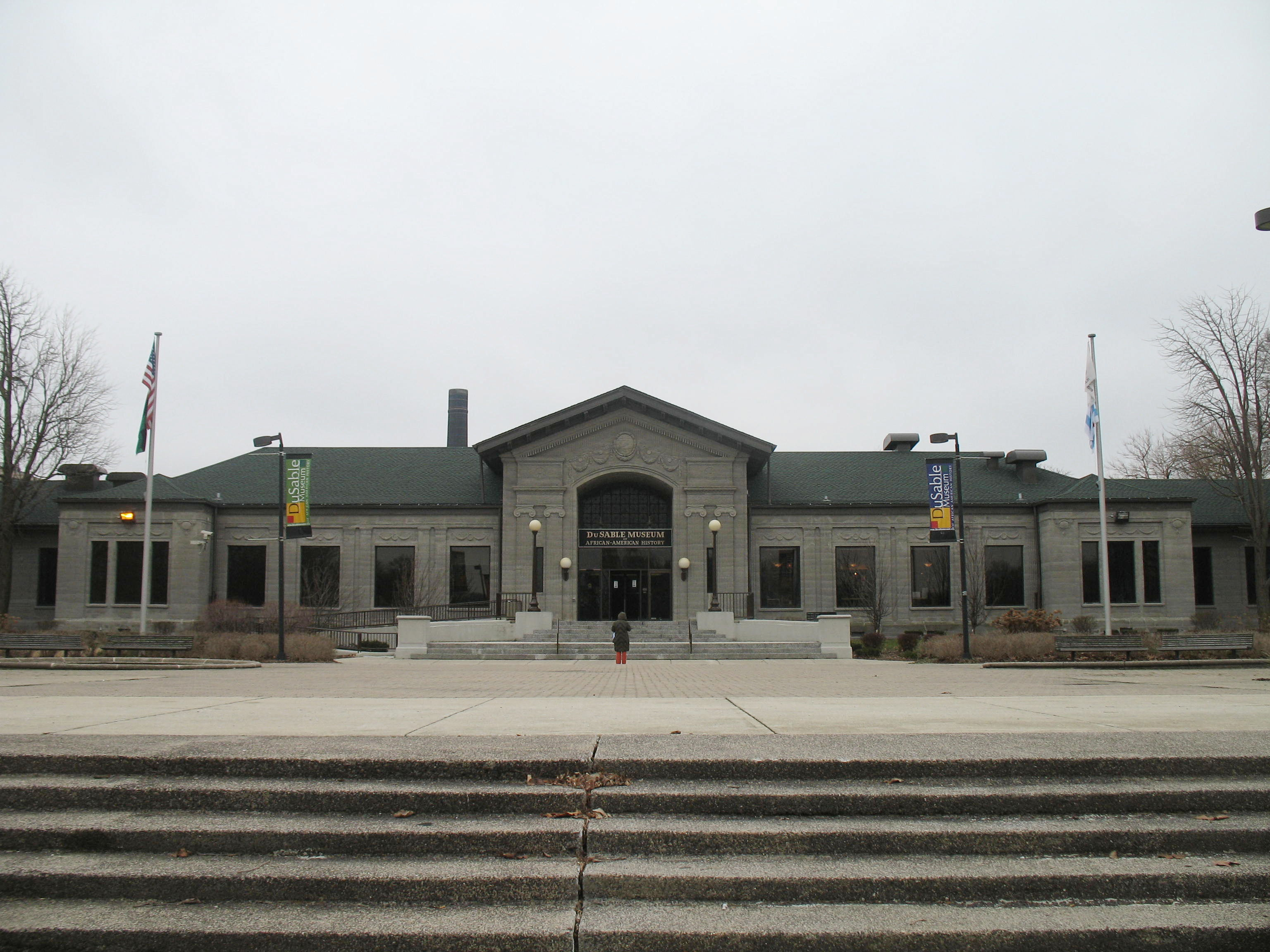
The current location of the DuSable Museum of African American History.

Burroughs was inspired by Harriet Tubman, Gerard L. Lew, Sojourner Truth, Frederick Douglass, and W.E.B. Du Bois. In Eugene Feldman's The Birth and Building of the DuSable Museum, Feldman writes about the influence Du Bois had on Burroughs' life. He believes that Burroughs greatly admired Du Bois and writes that she campaigned to bring him to Chicago to lecture to audiences. Feldman wrote: "If we read about 'cannabalistic and primitive Africa,'… it is a deliberate effort to put down a whole people and Dr. Du Bois fought this… Dr. Burroughs saw Dr. Du Bois and what he stood for and how he suffered himself to attain exposure of his views. She identified entirely with this important effort." Therefore, Burroughs clearly believed in Dr. Du Bois and the power of his message.

== Death ==
Burroughs died in Chicago on November 21, 2010.

== Awards and honors ==
- 1973 Young Women's Christian Association leadership award for excellence in art.
- 1975 The President's Humanitarian Award.
- 1982 Excellence in Art Award, National Association of Negro Museums.
- 1988 The Lifetime Achievement Award by the Women's Caucus for Art, Museum of Fine Arts, Houston.
- 1988 Progressive Black Woman's Award, Enverite Charity Club.
- 1989 The Paul Robeson Award.
- 2010 The Legends and Legacy Award, a program of the Leadership Advisory Committee of the Art Institute of Chicago.
- 2015 Inducted into the Chicago Literary Hall of Fame.
- On August 12, 2015, the Chicago Park District board voted to rename 31st Street Beach after Margaret Taylor-Burroughs. Burroughs had served as a commissioner on the park board for twenty-five years.
- The holdings of the Koehnline Museum of Art at Oakton Community College include a collection of fifteen of Burroughs' linocut prints from the 1990s.
- The Muscarelle Museum of Art exhibited Burroughs' "Black Venus" in an exhibition titled "Building on the Legacy: African American Art from the Permanent Collection" from September 2, 2017 - January 14, 2018.

== Selected writings ==
- Jasper, the drummin' boy (1947)
- Celebrating Negro History and Brotherhood: A Folio of Prints by Chicago Artists (1956)
- Whip me whop me pudding, and other stories of Riley Rabbit and his fabulous friends (1966)
- What shall I tell my children who are Black? (1968)
- Did you feed my cow? Street games, chants, and rhymes (1969)
- For Malcolm; poems on the life and the death of Malcolm X Dudley Randall and Margaret G. Burroughs, editors (1969)
- Africa, my Africa (1970)
- What shall I tell my children?: An addenda (1975)
- Interlude: seven musical poems by Frank Marshall Davis, Margaret T. Burroughs, editor. (1985)
- Minds flowing free: original poetry by "The Ladies" women's division of Cook County Department of Corrections, Margaret Taylor-Burroughs, editor (1986)
- The Family Linocut (1986)
- A very special tribute in honor of a very special person, Eugene Pieter Romayn Feldman, b. 1915-d. 1987 - poems, essays, letters by and to Eugene Pieter Romayn Feldman Margaret T. Burroughs, editor (1988)
- His name was Du Sable and he was the first (1990)
- Africa name book (1994)
- A shared heritage: art by four African Americans by William E. Taylor and Harriet G. Warkel with essays by Margaret T. G. Burroughs and others (1996)
- The Beginner's Guide to Collecting Fine Art, African American Style Ana M. Allen and Margaret Taylor Burroughs (1998)
- The tallest tree in the forest (1998)
- Humanist and glad to be (2003)
- My first husband & his four wives (me, being the first) (2003)

== Notes ==
a. Some sources say she was born in 1917
