= Nathan Lerner =

American photographer (1913–1997)

Nathan Lerner (1913 – February 8, 1997) was an American photographer and industrial designer involved in the New Bauhaus (later the IIT Institute of Design).

The New York Times wrote that his work "was inextricably bound up in the history of visual culture in Chicago," where he documented the vibrant immigrant neighborhood of Maxwell Street in the 1930s and later enrolled in the New Bauhaus under László Moholy-Nagy's tutelage. He stayed on as faculty after the school became the Institute of Design, and eventually was made educational director. While at the school he developed a light box technique which was a significant contribution to abstract photography, as well as a plywood-bending machine used in many of the school's furniture designs. After leaving the school in 1949 he started an industrial design practice best known for thermo-formed plastic products, including the now-ubiquitous bear-shaped honey bottle. He was Henry Darger's landlord and discovered Darger's work shortly before the artist's death.
