= A Dream Deferred =

A Dream Deferred may refer to:

- Montage of a Dream Deferred, a book-length poem suite published by Langston Hughes in 1951
- A Dream Deferred (album), 2012, by Brooklyn rapper Skyzoo
- "Harlem", a poem by Langston Hughes also known as "A Dream Deferred"
