= Ann Peacock =

South African screenwriter

- Born: 1951 (age 74–75); Cape Town, South Africa
- Citizenship: South Africa
- Occupation: Writer

Ann Peacock is a South African-born writer based in the United States. After teaching Law in her native South Africa, she moved to the United States and started a screenwriting career at after doing an Extension Course in screenwriting at the University of California, Los Angeles.

== Biography ==
Peacock was born in 1951 and raised in South Africa. She was educated at the University of Cape Town, where she obtained her law degree, and taught in the faculty of Law.

Her screenwriting career began after she moved to the United States, writing her first screenplay June the 16th as a screenwriting student inspired by a family experience with internal resistance to apartheid. She wrote the HBO film A Lesson Before Dying (1999), for which she won the 1999 Primetime Emmy Award for Outstanding Writing for a Limited or Anthology Series or Movie. In 2000, she adapted the Langston Hughes short story Cora Unashamed into a TV movie of the same name for PBS' The American Collection. In July 2002, Walden Media hired Peacock as the screenwriter for The Chronicles of Narnia: The Lion, the Witch and the Wardrobe, for which she was later nominated for the 2006 Hugo Award for Best Dramatic Presentation (Long Form).

Her screenwriting credits also include In My Country (2004), Pictures of Hollis Woods (2007), Kit Kittredge: An American Girl (2008), Nights in Rodanthe (2008), and The Killing Room (2009) She won the 2012 NAACP Image Award for Outstanding Writing in a Motion Picture for her screenplay The First Grader. In 2015, she adapted Alice Hoffman's book The Dovekeepers into a television miniseries of the same name for CBS.

She has a son who was engaged in the anti-apartheid movement.

== Filmography ==
Year	Title	Ref.
1999	A Lesson Before Dying	
2000	Cora Unashamed	
2004	In My Country	
2005	The Chronicles of Narnia: The Lion, the Witch and the Wardrobe	
2007	Pictures of Hollis Woods	
2008	Kit Kittredge: An American Girl	
2008	Nights in Rodanthe	
2009	The Killing Room	
2011	The First Grader	
2015	The Dovekeepers	

== Awards ==
Year	Title	Award	Result	Ref.
1999	A Lesson Before Dying	Primetime Emmy Award for Outstanding Writing for a Miniseries or a Movie	Won	
2006	The Chronicles of Narnia: The Lion, the Witch and the Wardrobe	Hugo Award for Best Dramatic Presentation (Long Form)	Nominated	
2012	The First Grader	NAACP Image Award for Outstanding Writing in a Motion Picture	Won	
