= A Raisin in the Sun (disambiguation) =

A Raisin in the Sun is a play by Lorraine Hansberry that debuted on Broadway in 1959.

A Raisin in the Sun may also refer to:

- "A raisin in the sun", a line fragment from the 1951 poem suite Montage of a Dream Deferred by Langston Hughes
- A Raisin in the Sun (1961 film), a theatrical film starring Sidney Poitier
- Raisin (musical), 1973, theater adaptation of the Lorraine Hansberry play
- A Raisin in the Sun (2008 film), a television film starring Sean Combs and Phylicia Rashad
