= The Big Sea =

1940 autobiography by Langston Hughes

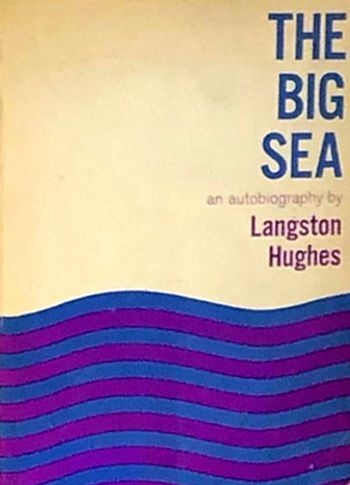
- Author: Langston Hughes
- Language: English
- Genre: Autobiography
- Publisher: Alfred A. Knopf
- Publication date: 1940
- Publication place: United States
- Media type: Print
- Pages: 335

The Big Sea (1940) is an autobiographical work by Langston Hughes. The book depicts many of the obstacles that African-American artists grappled with in the early 20th century. He recounts his years in Paris where he sought to establish himself as a writer, while working low-pay jobs such as cooking and waiting tables in nightclubs. He describes his experiences in New York City where he faced injustices stemming from systemic racism. The book reveals past struggles with an abusive father, and his conflicted emotions in which he remembers the damage it caused him, but also empathizes with the trauma his father had endured..

== Background ==
Hughes had a tumultuous childhood. He mainly grew up with his mother in Kansas after his father abandoned them to seek fortune in Mexico. Because of her skin color, Hughes' mother was unable to hold a stable, decent-paying job, which resulted in the family falling into poverty. Through his mother's eyes, Hughes learned about injustices in American society. He was sent to live with his grandmother for a period of time as his mother could not support him. During these years, he developed a love of language and writing, which helped him excel in school, and provided a refuge from his troubled life.

When he was 17 years old, Hughes went to his father's estate in Mexico. Hughes enrolled in college, but then decided to drop out to work on different kinds of shipping vessels that sailed around the world. Like his mother, he encountered racial discrimination that made it difficult to find continuous employment. He later moved to Paris and lived in low-income housing. There, he met numerous musicians from varied backgrounds. At the time, Paris was going through a musical revolution with Jazz and Blues. Hughes was fascinated with those musical genres and incorporated them into his evolving poetic style. He ended up publishing two poetry books, but neither sold well.

After returning to the U.S., he won a scholarship to Lincoln University (LU). He pointed out the absurdity of LU having an all-Negro student body and an all-white faculty. He became an advocate for hiring Negro teachers. In his senior year, he published his debut novel, Not Without Laughter (1930). He was financially supported at the time by an elderly white lady who lived on Park Avenue and championed Negro writers and artists. However, he eventually discovered that his benefactor was driven by prejudices and wanted him to write in a "primitive" way. He protested, which resulted in him getting cut off financially.

Hughes settled in Harlem at the time the U.S. financial boom was winding down in the late 1920s. Although he had close friends, he also faced challenges with his identity. In The Big Sea he wrote, "You see, unfortunately, I am not black." Instead he characterized himself as a light-skinned Negro of mixed racial background. As one reviewer put it, Hughes had an uneasy relationship with African Americans "who consider him too light-skinned to be kin, as well as too privileged and foreign".

Hughes worked to establish himself as an author, emerging as a major voice in the Harlem Renaissance. He documented his later life in a second autobiography, I Wonder As I Wander (1956).

== Plot summary ==
The Big Sea chronicles Hughes' youthful years in the 1920s and early '30s when he travelled in North America, Europe, and on the high seas.

=== Life in the U.S. and Mexico ===
In describing his childhood in the central and eastern U.S., and his time in Mexico with his father, Hughes witnesses and experiences drama and violence in places hostile to blacks. He tries different methods to earn money. In Mexico he becomes an in-demand English tutor, and saves enough money to move back to the U.S. to stay with his mother and other family members. This decision causes conflict with his father. Hughes enrolls in college but quickly determines it's not for him. Needing money, he turns to odd jobs, eventually obtaining work in a shipyard.

=== Life abroad ===
At age 21, Hughes boards the ship S.S. Malone as a mess boy bound for West Africa. From 1922 to 1924, he works on the Malone, visiting many west African countries before briefly returning to the U.S. in 1925 to live with his mother in Washington, D.C. He then embarks on a second voyage across the Atlantic, stopping off in France. He makes his way to Paris with little to nothing in his pockets. He says his early days in Paris were initially exciting, but then the reality of having no money weighs on him, and he is forced to find cramped accommodations in a shared room. Luckily, his roommate is a kind and gentle dancer, and together they seek employment. He recalls the challenges of being an African American who was not a singer, musician or dancer at the height of the Jazz Age in Paris.

He provides rich descriptions of the personalities he encountered in Paris and Montmartre, including the anti-foreign sentiment of local Frenchmen. He travels around Europe in search of employment and opportunities to publish his poetry. He makes multiple trips back and forth across the Atlantic, meeting important figures in the Harlem Renaissance, as well as some of the most celebrated stars of Paris. The book ends in 1931 when he has just won the Harmon Award. He notes how the award boosted his writing career, and how he hoped it would inspire other writers of color.

== Reception ==
In her New York Times review, Katherine Woods characterized The Big Sea as "the product and portrait of a very unusual spirit, in its narrative of crowded happenings and contrasts and the envisioning of a strange and significant time." She emphasized that the social circumstances in which Hughes was raised shaped both his development as a writer and the quality of his autobiography. In the journal Phylon, Henrietta Herod said of the book that

Hughes has written amusingly...and always, one feels, sincerely. In it he has been frank and intellectually honest, writing without reticence and yet with reserve. He seems to have understood the ephemeral nature of the vogue for the Negro in art forms and himself to have been aware always of his being an American Negro. However, it must be said that in spots the book is pedestrian and thin both as to content and style and gives greater emphasis to incident and situation than seems justifiable. Too often it is undistinguished writing.

In a later appraisal, The Big Sea was called "one of the most insightful studies of the Harlem Renaissance ever written by one who had actually lived during that time". The reviewer noted that Hughes provided a detailed examination of the external world he moved in, while "masking his interior personal world". Another reviewer wrote, "The Big Sea makes us appreciate the complexities of being an honest and talented light-skinned black in an unreformed America".
