= Fine Clothes to the Jew =

Book by Langston Hughes

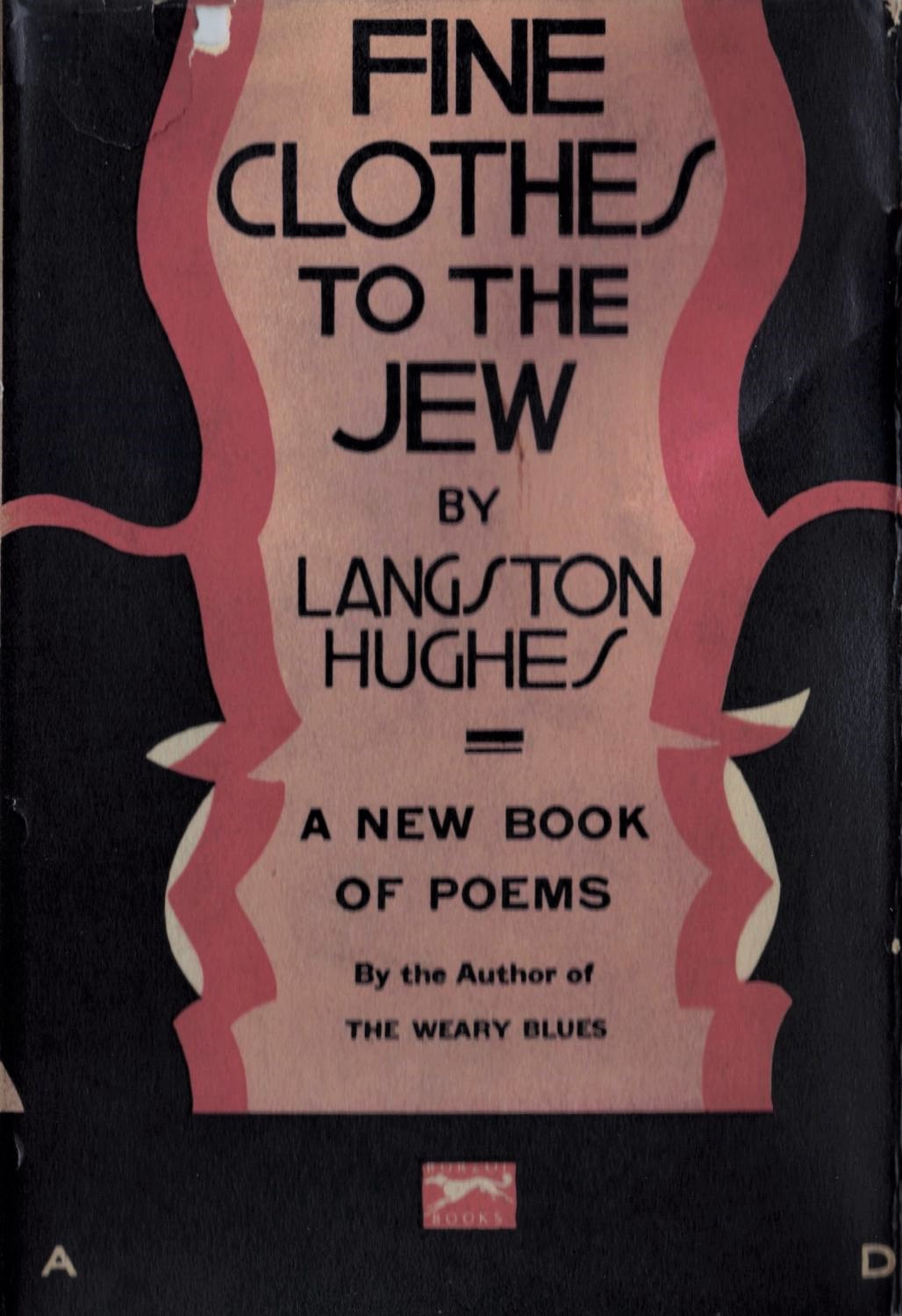
- 1st Edition Cover
- Author: Langston Hughes
- Language: English
- Genre: Poetry
- Published: 1927
- Publisher: Alfred A. Knopf
- Publication place: United States

Fine Clothes to the Jew is a 1927 poetry collection by Langston Hughes published by Alfred A. Knopf. Because it departed from sentimental depictions of African-American culture, the collection was widely criticized, especially in the Black press, when it was published.

== Publication and response ==
The title appears in the poem "Hard Luck" in the book's first section. It refers to a phrase popular in Harlem at the time, referring to citizens who would pawn fine clothes to predominantly Jewish-owned pawn shops when they were short on money.

The collection was Hughes' least successful in terms of both sales and critical reception. However, his first work The Weary Blues and this collection made his reputation. Biographer Arnold Rampersad called it Hughes' "most brilliant book of poems."
