= Langston Hughes House =

Historic house in Manhattan, New York

- U.S. National Register of Historic Places
- New York State Register of Historic Places
- New York City Landmark
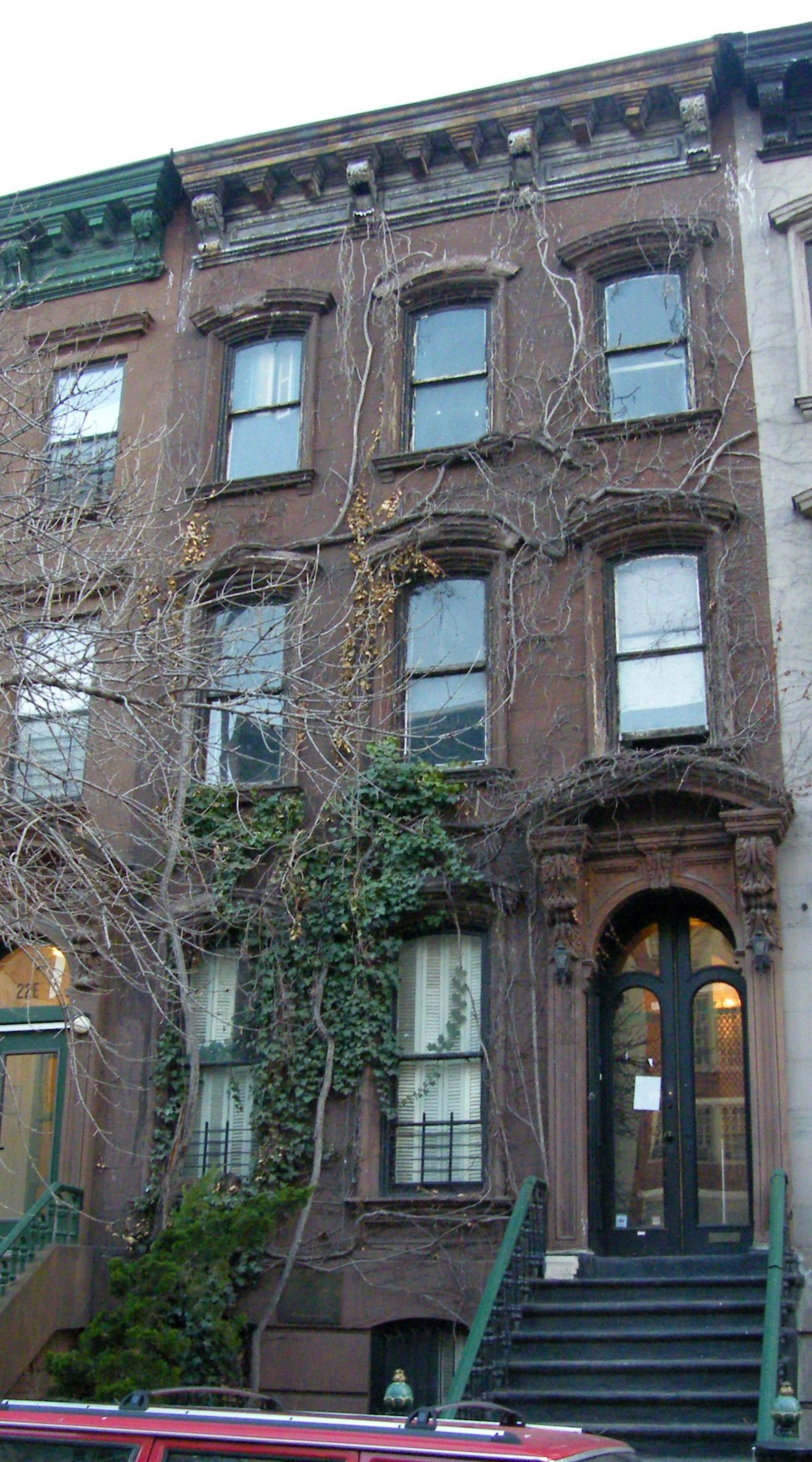
- Langston Hughes House, March 2009

- Location within New York City Location within New York Location within the United States
- Location: 20 E. 127th St., New York, New York
- Coordinates: 40°48′26″N 73°56′27″W
- Area: less than one acre
- Built: 1869
- Architect: Wilson, Alexander
- Architectural style: Italianate
- NRHP reference No.: 82001198
- NYSRHP No.: 06101.001704
- NYCL No.: 1135

Significant dates
- Added to NRHP: October 29, 1982
- Designated NYSRHP: September 9, 1982
- Designated NYCL: August 11, 1981

The Langston Hughes House is a historic home located in Harlem, Manhattan, New York City. It is an Italianate style dwelling built in 1869. It is a three-story-with-basement, rowhouse faced in brownstone and measuring 20 feet wide and 45 feet deep. Noted African American poet and author Langston Hughes (1902–1967) occupied the top floor as his workroom from 1947 to 1967. The building's owners were Hughes's adopted uncle and aunt, Emerson and Ethel Harper. In this house, Hughes wrote Montage of a Dream Deferred and I Wonder as I Wander.

The house was listed on the National Register of Historic Places in 1982, and was designated as a city landmark by the New York City Landmarks Preservation Commission in 1981. By 2026, the house was being restored.

== See also ==
- List of New York City Designated Landmarks in Manhattan above 110th Street
- National Register of Historic Places listings in Manhattan above 110th Street
- List of residences of American writers
