= Mother to Son =

1922 poem by Langston Hughes

- by Langston Hughes
- Publisher: The Crisis
- Publication date: 1922; 104 years ago
- Lines: 20

"Mother to Son" is a 1922 poem by American writer and activist Langston Hughes. The poem follows a mother speaking to her son about her life, which she says "ain't been no crystal stair". She first describes the struggles she has faced and then urges him to continue moving forward. It was referenced by Martin Luther King Jr. several times in his speeches during the civil rights movement, and has been analyzed by several critics, notably for its style and representation of the mother.

== Background ==
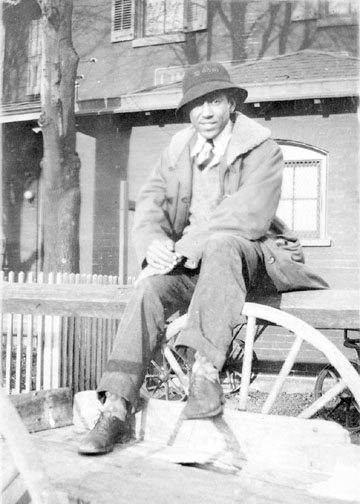
Hughes at Lincoln University in 1928

Langston Hughes was a prominent figure in the Harlem Renaissance – the African-American cultural revival that spanned the 1920s and 1930s – and he wrote poetry that focused on the Black experience in America. His poem "Mother to Son" was first published in 1922 in The Crisis (official magazine of the National Association for the Advancement of Colored People), and in 1926 it was included in his first poetry collection, The Weary Blues.

== Text ==
Well, son, I’ll tell you:
Life for me ain’t been no crystal stair.
It’s had tacks in it,
And splinters,
And boards torn up,
And places with no carpet on the floor—
Bare.
But all the time
I’se been a-climbin’ on,
And reachin’ landin’s,
And turnin’ corners,
And sometimes goin’ in the dark
Where there ain’t been no light.
So boy, don’t you turn back.
Don’t you set down on the steps
’Cause you finds it’s kinder hard.
Don’t you fall now—
For I’se still goin’, honey,
I’se still climbin’,
And life for me ain’t been no crystal stair.

== Reception and analysis ==
Hughes's poems "Mother to Son", "The Negro Speaks of Rivers", and "Harlem" were described in the Encyclopedia of African-American Writing as "anthems of black America". The linguist John Rickford considers Hughes's use of African-American Vernacular English to be representative of "a convention of dialect writing rather than an accurate depiction of African-American speech".

=== Mother ===
"Mother to Son" is the first of several of Hughes's poems that present strong women. The mother in the poem uses a metaphor of a staircase to convey "the hardships of Black life" while also her progress and perseverance. As the woman is climbing the stairs, she becomes almost comparable to a religious figure ascending into the heavens, yet remains simply human. Her climb is also comparable to a quest, according to R. Baxter Miller. Miller concludes that "Her internal light illuminates the outer world."

The mother who is delivering the poem to her young son has been described as an "allegorical persona", who could represent numerous African-American mothers urging their children forward. The professor R. Baxter Miller considers "Mother to Son" to illustrate "how dialect can be used with dignity." The scholars Regennia N. Williams and Carmaletta M. Williams consider "Mother to Son" to most closely represent Hughes's relationship with his grandmother, Mary Leary Langston.

=== Structure ===
The poem utilizes strong elements of parallelism throughout. It is written in a accentual-syllabic verse, with two lines of Iambic pentameter (line 2: "Life for me ain’t been no crystal stair." and line 6: "And places with no carpet on the floor—"). In the first six lines, the words "stair" and "floor" are slant rhymes, meaning that they have similar sounds but are not 'perfect' rhymes. The following line, line seven ("Bare"), is a perfect rhyme with "stair" and the only line in the whole poem that is monosyllabic. One critic notes that "it seems as though the mother’s spartan accommodation, hardscrabble life, and unadorned language all converge on the word bare."

The scholar Michael Skansgaard divides "Mother to Son" into five "units". The first two lines introduce the poem. The speaker then goes on to describe how her life has not been a "crystal stair", and the struggles she has faced. A new section begins after "Bare", where she starts describing climbing of the stair ("But all the time/I'se been a-climbin' on"). She goes on to urge her son to not "turn back", but breaks the pattern established in the two previous sections by only repeating the concept three times, instead of four. Finally the poem ends where it started, describing the climbing of the stair case. R. Baxter Miller writes that the "individual lines skillfully blend anapestic, iambic, and trochaic cadences". He considers the structure to provide "the folk diction and rhythm that make the woman real".

=== References ===
Martin Luther King Jr., an American civil rights activist and leader, referenced "Mother to Son" at least 13 times in his public appearances, including during his "I Have a Dream" speech. These references largely took the form of wording referring to pressing forward and not turning back. W. Jason Miller describes these references as "overt" and argues that Barack Obama "inadvertently" alluded to the poem in his speech at the 2008 Democratic National Convention.
