= Cora Unashamed =

2000 TV film directed by Deborah Pratt

- Based on: Cora Unashamed by Langston Hughes
- Teleplay by: Ann Peacock
- Directed by: Deborah Pratt
- Starring: Regina Taylor; Cherry Jones; Ellen Muth; Michael Gaston; Kohl Sudduth; Arlen Dean Snyder; CCH Pounder
- Theme music composer: Patrice Rushen
- Country of origin: United States
- Original language: English

Production
- Producers: Ronald Colby; Rebecca Eaton; Anne Hopkins; Stephen Kulczycki; Marian Rees
- Cinematography: Ernest Holzman
- Editor: Debra I. Moore
- Running time: 93 minutes
- Production companies: Alt Films; WGBH

Original release
- Release: October 25, 2000

Cora Unashamed is a 2000 American made-for-television drama film from The American Collection directed by Deborah Pratt, starring Regina Taylor and Cherry Jones. The film was shot on location in October 1999 in central Iowa. Cities such as Ames, Cambridge and Story City were used. The movie is based on a short story by the same name in The Ways of White Folks, a 1934 collection of short stories by Langston Hughes. Cinematographer Ernest Holzman won an American Society of Cinematographers (ASC) Award, for Outstanding Achievement in Cinematography in Movies of the Week/Mini-Series'/Pilot for Network or Basic Broadcast TV, for his work on this film. David Herbert Donald called the short story "a brilliantly realized portrait of an isolated black woman in a small Middle Western town, who stoically survives her own sorrows but in the end lashes out against the hypocrisy of the whites who employ her."

== Synopsis ==
This adaptation of Langston Hughes' powerful tale, set in the 1920s and 30s, tells the story of Cora Jenkins, the daughter of the only African-American family in the small Iowa town of Melton. Cora supports her mother and her daughter, Josephine, by working as a domestic in the home of the socially driven Mrs. Studevant, where she serves almost as a surrogate mother to the Studevants' daughter, Jessie. Cora's own daughter dies, and Cora's relationship with Jessie grows even deeper. When Jessie dies as a result of an abortion arranged by her mother and the latter lies about the cause to preserve her social standing, Cora must risk her livelihood, her security, and her place in the community in order to speak the truth and honor the memory of the child she loved and lost.

== Cast ==
- Regina Taylor - Cora Jenkins
- Cherry Jones - Lizbeth Studevant
- Ellen Muth - Jessie at 18
  - Molly Graham - Jessie at 5
- Michael Gaston - Arthur Studevant
- Kohl Sudduth - Joe
- Arlen Dean Snyder - Dr. Siebels
- CCH Pounder - Ma Jenkins
- Tinashe - Josephine Jenkins
- Ben Easter - Willie Matsoulis
- Melissa Albright - Mary Studevant
  - Tiffany M. Wren - 13 year-old Mary
- Tom Woodward - Reverend Macelroy
- Bethany Larson - Muriel Debord
- David Fritts - Tom Debord
- Stephen George - Luther Jenkins
- John Easter - Mr. Matsoulis
- Logan Rees - Paperboy

== Home media ==
The film was released on VHS on December 4, 2001.
