= Note on Commercial Theatre =

Poem by Langston Hughes

"Note on Commercial Theatre" is a poem by Langston Hughes written in 1940 and republished in 2008.

== Background and analysis ==
Langston Hughes was a prominent writer during the Harlem Renaissance, which is obvious in most of his poetry. Hughes writes about the issues of the day, and "Note on Commercial Theatre" is no different.

=== Roots vs. novelty ===
During the Harlem Renaissance, one of the main controversies was that African American culture became the "vogue" of the day. This included interest not only in black writing and art, but in the rising jazz and theatre scenes as well. Harlem became the hot spot for this new black culture; both black and whites explored and became immersed in it. Because it was so popular, many white people attempted to infuse their own art with the new African American styles, resulting in hybrid music and theatre (for example, a swing version of The Mikado, a comic opera).

Hughes was a huge proponent of creating a separate black identity and art, hence the extreme antipathy within "Note on Commercial Theatre" to black culture being absorbed by whites. This is reflected in his use of an experimental form for his poem; there is a lack of rhyme scheme and no discernible rhythm to the lines. Other black writers of the time, such as Countee Cullen, experimented within specific forms, but Hughes rejects form in this poem; he rejects the absorption into any other style but his own.

=== Dependence vs. independence ===
This vogue of African American culture became a controversy because not only was it becoming meshed with white culture in a time when the Pan-African movement was strong and blacks were trying to create a separate identity, but "Note on Commercial Theatre" also shows an anxiety over the dependence of black culture on white patronage. It was hard for African Americans to become published or find an audience outside of Harlem without going through white publishing houses. The final lines of the poem reflect the idea that for a truly African American culture to persist, it would have to be founded from within its own community:

But someday somebody'll
Stand up and talk about me,
And write about me-
Black and beautiful-
And sing about me,
And put on plays about me!

I reckon it'll be
Me myself!

Yes, it'll be me.

== Sources ==
- https://web.archive.org/web/20080513083425/http://encarta.msn.com/encyclopedia_761566483/Harlem_Renaissance.html
- Harlem Renaissance#Mainstream recognition of Harlem culture
- Huggins, Nathan Irvin. Harlem Renaissance. New York: Oxford University Press, 1971.
- https://web.archive.org/web/20080304181309/http://www.jcu.edu/harlem/index.htm
- Hughes, Langston. "Note on Commercial Theatre." The Norton Anthology of American Literature. Shorter seventh ed. Volume 2. New York: W.W. Norton & Company, 2008.
