= The Weary Blues =

1926 poem written by Langston Hughes

- by Langston Hughes
- First published in: 1925; 101 years ago
- Country: United States
- Language: English
- Genre(s): African-American poetry Jazz poetry
- Publisher: Opportunity: A Journal of Negro Life (Urban League)

Full text
- The Weary Blues at Wikisource

"The Weary Blues" is a poem by American poet Langston Hughes. Written in 1925, "The Weary Blues" was first published in the Urban League magazine Opportunity. It was awarded the magazine's prize for best poem of the year. The poem was included in Hughes's first book, a collection of poems, also entitled The Weary Blues. (Four poems from the book, although not the title poem, inspired the musical settings "Four Songs from The Weary Blues" by Florence Price.)

The Weary Blues

Droning a drowsy syncopated tune,
Rocking back and forth to a mellow croon,
I heard a Negro play.
Down on Lenox Avenue the other night
By the pale dull pallor of an old gas light
He did a lazy sway . . .
He did a lazy sway . . .
To the tune o' those Weary Blues.
With his ebony hands on each ivory key
He made that poor piano moan with melody.
O Blues!
Swaying to and fro on his rickety stool
He played that sad raggy tune like a musical fool.
Sweet Blues!
Coming from a black man’s soul.
O Blues!
In a deep song voice with a melancholy tone
I heard that Negro sing, that old piano moan—
"Ain't got nobody in all this world,
Ain't got nobody but ma self.
I's gwine to quit ma frownin'
And put ma troubles on the shelf."
Thump, thump, thump, went his foot on the floor.
He played a few chords then sang some more—
"I got the Weary Blues
And I can't be satisfied.
Got the Weary Blues
And can't be satisfied—
I ain't happy no mo'
And I wish that I had died."
And far into the night he crooned that tune.
The stars went out and so did the moon.
The singer stopped playing and went to bed
While the Weary Blues echoed through his head.
He slept like a rock or a man that's dead.

== Background ==
Langston Hughes was known as one of the most prominent and influential figures of the Harlem Renaissance, a rebirth movement of African Americans in the arts during the 1920s. He wrote about the world around him, giving a voice to African Americans during a time of segregation. Hughes was both a contributor and supporter of his fellow African-American writers. Collectively, they changed the way the world viewed African Americans because of their talents and ability to capture real life and turn it into art.

Hughes wrote of inequality ("I, Too"), of resilience ("Mother to Son" and "The Negro Speaks of Rivers"), of pride ("My People"), of hope ("Freedom's Plow"), and of music ("The Trumpet Player" and "Juke Box Love Song"). He was the author of several novels, a memoir, song lyrics, children's books, plays, countless songs and more than 20 books.

"The Weary Blues" takes place at an old Harlem bar on Lenox Avenue. There is a piano player playing the blues. As he plays, the speaker observes his body movement and the tone of his voice. Throughout the poem, several literary devices are used to guide the reader through the mixture of emotions the blues player is feeling. The vivid imagery and use of language gives the reader a more personal glimpse into the life of the man playing the blues.

== Theme and literary devices ==
Langston Hughes wrote "The Weary Blues" in 1925 during Prohibition and the Harlem Renaissance. The setting of the poem is actually unclear, at first. However, as it goes on it is obvious the speaker is in a bar, or was. The speaker is telling a story. He starts by setting the mood with an alliteration, "droning a drowsy syncopated tune / Rocking back and forth to a mellow croon". The narrator wants his listener and reader to get a feel for the story he is about to tell. He wants people to know that he enjoyed the experience. Yet, his tone is unhurried and nonchalant, like he just happened to stumble across “the tune o’ those Weary Blues." He was in a bar that provided entertainment. Once the speaker finishes his rendition of the musician’s song, the setting changes. At the end of the poem, the reader ends up in the musician’s home.

"The Weary Blues" is written in free verse; however, all the lines that are not lyrics to the "Weary Blues" are rhyming couplets: "Down on Lenox Avenue the other night / By the pale dull pallor of an old gas light." Night and light rhyme just like tune-croon, key-melody, stool-fool and all the other couplets. The rhymes are not perfect, but when read out loud the rhyme scheme is pleasing to the ear. It is also worth noting that the poem ends with three rhyming lines: "the singer stopped playing and went to bed / While the Weary Blues echoed through his head / He slept like a rock or a man that's dead." The last three lines are a finite conclusion. The rest of the poem builds and builds until its end.

The music in “The Weary Blues” is a metaphor for life as a black man. The color in the poem is symbolic of the black struggle. It starts with slave spirituals in which "slaves calculatingly created songs of double-entendre as an intellectual strategy", as Hughes does in his poem. When he says, "I heard a Negro play" he is making the musician decidedly black. The lines "with his ebony hands on each ivory key. He made that poor piano moan with melody" continues the reference to color, and decidedly differentiates black from white. Hughes personifies the piano with a humanly moan, but the moan also indicates his abuse of the "ivory key" and the "melancholy tone" of the music.

However, the poem is a celebration of blues. In lines 11, 14 and 16, there are apostrophes to the blues. "O Blues!" and "Sweet Blues" are the speaker's exclamations of delight. He just cannot contain himself when it comes to the blues. He even notices the musician enjoying the music and adds the onomatopoeia of a "thump, thump, thump". "The Weary Blues" is an enjoyable poem and song, yet its message is one of sadness.

== Reception ==
"The Weary Blues" is one of Hughes's most famous poems. Critics have claimed that the poem is a combination of blues and jazz with personal experiences. It embodies blues as a metaphor and form. It has also been coined as one of the first works of blues performance in literature. Throughout the poem, music is seen as not only a form of art and entertainment, but also as a way of life: people living the blues. Hughes's ability to incorporate poetry with music and history with art has given him the reputation as one of the leading black artists of the 20th century. "The Weary Blues" allows the reader to seek to unlock the mystery of the blues, for both the musician and themselves.

== Recordings ==
On March 17 and March 18, 1958, Hughes recorded readings of "The Weary Blues" and several of his other poems backed by two different jazz groups, which were issued on the MGM album Weary Blues, and later reissued on Verve Records. On side 1 of the album, he was backed by a Leonard Feather-led group that included Henry "Red" Allen, Sam "The Man" Taylor, Vic Dickenson, Milt Hinton, and Osie Johnson. On side 2, the accompaniment was provided by a Charles Mingus-led group that included Horace Parlan, Shafi Hadi, and Jimmy Knepper.

Hughes slow jams "The Weary Blues" (1925) to jazz accompaniment by the Doug Parker Band on the CBUT (CBC Vancouver) program The 7 O'Clock Show in 1958. Host Bob Quintrell introduces the performance.
