= The Ways of White Folks =

Book by Langston Hughes

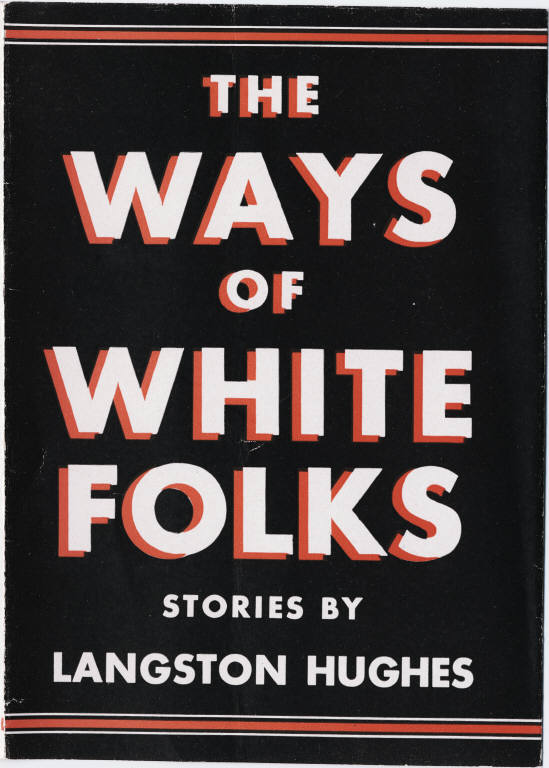
- Author: Langston Hughes
- Language: English
- Genre: Short story collection
- Publisher: Knopf (first edition); Vintage (1990)
- Publication date: June 18, 1934
- Publication place: United States
- Pages: 248 (first edition) / 272 (1990 paperback)
- ISBN: 0-679-72817-1 (1990 paperback)
- LC Class: PZ3.H87313 Way PS3515.U274
- Preceded by: Scottsboro Limited (1932)

The Ways of White Folks is a collection of fourteen short stories by Langston Hughes, published in 1934. Hughes wrote the book during a year he spent living in Carmel-by-the-Sea, California. The collection addresses multiple dimensions of racial issues, focusing specifically on the unbalanced yet interdependent power dynamics between Black and White people. According to Hughes, the short stories are inspired either by his own lived experiences or those of others he encountered.

== Background ==
He finished the book in the year he spent in Carmel, California, immediately upon return from an extended trip to Russia. While working, he primarily lived in a cottage, fondly known as "Ennesfree". The cottage was provided by Noel Sullivan, one of several of Hughes' patrons.

Hughes' stay in Carmel is marked by notable sense of deep community connection and sustenance. In a letter to close friends, Matt and Evelyn "Nebby" Crawford, he laments: "A few months ago I was worried about being undernourished in Tashkent. Now, I['m] worried about being over-nourished in Carmel."

As for his career, the time between 1933 and 1934 spent in Carmel is considered by Hughes to be the first extended amount of time that he could stay in one community and devote himself to his craft. He worked ten to twelve hours each day, completing at least one story or article each week.

Although the book is his first collection of short stories, several of the works included in The Ways of White Folks were originally printed in other publications. These publications include Esquire, The American Mercury, Scribner's, Opportunity, The Brooklyn Daily Eagle, Debate, and Abbott's Monthly.

== Contents ==
The collection consists of 14 short stories:

I. "Cora Unashamed" is the first story within the collection. The narrative details Cora Jenkins' life as one of the only Black persons in a rural-American town. The short story explores themes of societal discrimination based on race, class, and sex.

II. "Slave on the Block" is the second story within the collection, a tongue-in-cheek exploration of the Carraways, a married White artist couple, and the reductive relationship they have with Luther and Mattie, their Black employees. The short story was originally published in the September 1933 edition of Scribner's Magazine.

III. "Home" is the third story within the collection, detailing the return of talented violinist Roy Williams to his hometown of Hopkinsville, Missouri. The work was originally published under the name "The Folks at Home" in the May 1934 edition of Esquire.

IV. "Passing" is the fourth story within the collection. The narrative is delivered by Jack through a letter to his mother, where he reveals the complex experience of passing as White, despite identifying as Black.

V. "A Good Job Done" is the fifth story within the collection. The story explores the occupation of a young man working for a well-off Mr. Lloyd, and the conditions that led to the end of the job. The short work was originally published in the April 1934 edition of Esquire Magazine.

VI. "Rejuvenation Through Joy" is the sixth story within the collection. The narrative details the mayhem of con-man Eugene Lesche and his jazz-themed soul colony, created to help people achieve spiritual enlightenment. The work comments on the African primitivist aesthetic, qualifying previous historical focuses of the lens, while still advocating for its relevance.

VII. "The Blues I'm Playing" is the seventh story within the collection. The work details the patronage relationship between Osceola Jones, a young Black pianist, and her patron, Mrs. Ellsworth. The short story was originally published in the May 1934 edition of Scribner's Magazine.

VIII. "Red-Headed Baby" is the eighth story within the collection. The story recounts consequences of Mister Clarence's, a white seaman, return to a small town on the coast of Florida to visit a former lover, a biracial Betsy.

IX. "Poor Little Black Fellow" is the ninth story within the collection, describing the life of Arnie, a Black orphan left in the care of the White upper-class Pemberton couple. The story explores Arnie's isolation as the only Black member of his New England community, and his experience abroad searching for connection.

X. "Little Dog" is the tenth story within the collection, detailing the lives of the lonely Miss Briggs, her little white dog Flips, and the new Black janitor, Joe.

XI. "Berry" is the eleventh story within the collection. The story focuses on Millberry Jones', a young Black man, time working for sanatorium for disabled children.

XII. "Mother and Child" is the twelfth story within the collection, depicting the impacts of an interracial affair and the resulting child's birth on a small Ohio town.

XIII. "One Christmas Eve" is the thirteenth story within the collection. The story examines Joe's, a young Black child, experience meeting Santa in a White-only movie theater.

XIV. "Father and Son" is the fourteenth and final story within the collection. The story details the lives and relationship of plantation owner Colonel Thomas Norwood and his biracial, rebellious son, Bert.

== "Cora Unashamed" ==
=== Summary ===
"Cora Unashamed" introduces forty-year-old Cora Jenkins' life as one of the only Black persons in the rural town of Melton. Cora has a child with a White foreigner, Joe, out of wedlock. Upon realization of Cora's pregnancy, Joe leaves town and Cora, forcing her to raise Josephine on her own. Cora also works as a maid for the high-society Studevant family, cooking, cleaning, and taking care of the Studevant's child, Jessie. Upon Josephine's early death from whooping-cough, Cora begins to treat Jessie as her own child.

The two develop an incredibly close relationship throughout the years. When Jessie becomes pregnant just before graduating high school, Cora bears the responsibility of informing the senior Studevants. Jessie's parents are incredibly ashamed of the premarital pregnancy and induce an unwanted abortion upon Jessie. Jessie ultimately dies from distress a few weeks after the procedure. Cora is distraught at the loss of Jessie. She attends Jessie's funeral and publicly accuses the Studevants of killing both Jessie and the child. Afterwards, despite no longer working for the Studevants, the Jenkins family still "manage[s] to get along.

=== Reception ===
David Herbert Donald called "Cora Unashamed" "a brilliantly realized portrait of an isolated black woman in a small Middle Western town, who stoically survives her own sorrows but in the end lashes out against the hypocrisy of the whites who employ her." That story was adapted into a film of the same name from The American Collection directed by Deborah M. Pratt, starring Regina Taylor and Cherry Jones, and released in 2000.

== "Slave on the Block" ==
"Slave on the Block" is an exploration of the relationship between the Carraways, two affluent White New Yorkers, and Black culture. Michael and Anne Carraway, a musician and an artist respectively, are interested in the exotic aesthetic of Black Art and Black Americans. Upon meeting Luther, the Black nephew of their former cook, the Carraways hire him under pretenses as their gardener. Jobless and recently relocated from the South, Luther happily accepts employment and included accommodations.

As time progresses, however, the Carraways become more concerned with using Luther as inspiration for their art, rather than employment. Luther is quickly taken under the wing of Mattie, the older Black maid in the Carraway house. Eventually, the two become romantically involved. Throughout the novel, the Carraways remain oblivious to Mattie and Luther's personal boundaries, perceiving them as objects of entertainment, inspiration, and housework.

Building tensions reach a turning point when Mr. Carraway's mother comes to visit from Kansas. After a snide comment from Luther and seeing him bare-chested in the house, the senior Mrs. Carraway screams, calls Luther a slur, and demands his dismissal. Michael Carraway does so immediately. Mattie joins Luther in departure, admonishing the Carraways for their lack of respect and demanding that she and Luther both be paid before leaving. Mr. Carraway complies.

== "Home" ==
"Home" details the return of Roy Williams, a talented young jazz musician, to his hometown of Hopkinsville, Missouri. Roy has spent the last half of a decade traveling, performing with an orchestra in night clubs across Europe. He returns due to illness, certain that he will die soon. Upon return to his hometown, Roy challenges the norms of a Black American in the small town he grew up in—he is well-dressed, educated, and has financial means from performing abroad.

Despite a cold welcome from his white townsmen, Roy's mother is elated her violin prodigy son has returned. At his homecoming concert Roy meets Miss Reese, an older White music teacher at the local high school. Miss Reese is particularly impressed with Roy's talent and invites him to play for her Senior music appreciation class. After the performance, Miss Reese lauds Roy as a true musical artist, despite his poor performance due to the progressing illness.

Late one autumn night, a weakened Roy takes a walk through the center of town. During his outing, he is greeted by Miss Reese and the two strike up casual conversation as two appreciators of music. Mid-conversation, Roy is attacked by a White mob under the pretense that he was attacking Miss Reese. The mob lynches Roy, beating him to death and hanging his naked body on a tree at the edge of town.

The short story was originally published under the title "The Folks at Home" in Esquire in the May 1934 edition, including the description "The story of what happens when an uppity nigger has forgotten his place in his old hometown."

== "Passing" ==
"Passing" is a story told by Jack through a letter to his mother, revealing the complex experience of individuals that can pass as White, despite identifying as Black. After physically passing his mother on the street and being unable to acknowledge her, Jack writes to his mother reflecting on his ability to pass. Jack acknowledges he can achieve a higher level of social and economic status because he is categorized as White by society.

Despite these benefits, there are still consequences to this passing. As a member of White society, Jack is unable to share his life with his Black family, his mother, and siblings Gladys and Charlie. The letter closes with Jack detailing his hopes and plans for the future, including moving to a big city, marrying a White woman, buying a house, acknowledging only his White children, and never seeing his family again.

== "A Good Job Gone" ==
"A Good Job Gone" is written from the perspective of a young Black Columbia student. The young man works for Mr. Lloyd, a well-off man with a propensity for women and liquor, as a domestic servant. Mr. Lloyd and the young man have an amicable relationship; Mr. Lloyd pays the young man well, the young man does as Mr. Lloyd asks, and the two often drink together. The young man is quite content with their arrangement, until Pauline arrives.

Pauline is a Black woman, and the only woman that can hold Mr. Lloyd's attention. Despite his adoration, Pauline sees Mr. Lloyd as a financial asset, stoking his needs in exchange for financial support. Upon learning Pauline has another lover and is only interested in him monetarily, Mr. Lloyd falls into a drunken stupor. He spends weeks intoxicated and in search of Pauline, who has left Harlem and cannot be found.

Upon realizing Pauline is gone, Mr. Lloyd slips into psychosis and is checked into a sanatorium. The story concludes with the young man completing college with no means to get to dental school, as he has yet to find another occupation since his good job with Mr. Lloyd has gone.

The short story was originally published in May 1934 in Esquire, described as "the story twelve men out of every thirteen wanted- but the thirteenth can always skip."

== "Rejuvenation Through Joy" ==
"Rejuvenation Through Joy" is a narrative detailing the misadventures of Mr. Eugene Lesche, a con-artist capitalizing upon Black culture and stereotypes. Eugene and his longtime business partner Sol Blum open a jazz-themed cult, connecting the ideas of Black rhythm, happy souls, and the path to spiritual rejuvenation. Eugene Lesche's Cult of Joy is initially wildly successful, but ultimately fails after an unsuccessful attempted double-homicide. After Lesche's disappearance, it is revealed by the tabloids that he was a Black man passing for White the entire time.

=== Primitivism ===
In terms of African primitivism, Hughes simultaneously criticizes the primitivist camp for its absurdity, while still advocating that jazz music illuminates a suppressed aspect of the Western individual's consciousness, and that African Americans can access this repressed psyche more readily than White folks. The story also comments on the deep issue of Black Americans', including Hughes, participation in promoting problematic overreaches of primitivism in the 1920s.

== "The Blues I'm Playing" ==
"The Blues I'm Playing" details the relationship between Oceola Jones, a young Black piano prodigy, and Mrs. Dora Ellsworth, Oceola's wealthy patron. Mrs. Ellsworth demands Osceola prioritize art above else, especially Osceola's lover, Pete. For a long period of time, Osceola conforms to Mrs. Ellsworth's requests, moving out of Harlem and devoting herself to pianism and the study of art.

Eventually, Osceola realizes that her expression of music requires expression, passion, and living, and stands in contrast to Mrs. Ellsworth's perception of art. When Pete asks Osceola to marry him, Osceola accepts at the expense of losing Mrs. Ellsworth's patronage. The story concludes with an estranged-Osceola playing her own composition of blues for an unimpressed Mrs. Ellsworth.

"The Blues I'm Playing" was originally published in the May 1934 edition of Scribner's Magazine.

== "Red-Headed Baby" ==
"Red-Headed Baby" describes fallout of Mister Clarence, a white seaman's, return to a small town on the coast of Florida to visit a former lover, a mixed-race Betsy. After a few drinks, Betsy, her mother, and Mister Clarence are interrupted by Clarence, Betsy's two year old, red-haired, blue-eyed, disabled, white child. Mister Clarence is struck by the existence and appearance of his child, particularly with how similar they look. He leaves abruptly and pays for the alcohol he's consumed, much to the surprise of Betsy.

== "Poor Little Black Fellow" ==
"Poor Little Black Fellow" explores the life of Arnie, a Black orphan left in the care of the White Pemberton family. The entire town of Mapelton is overly kind towards Arnie because he is the only Black person in town. Even still, he still feels separated and lonely. In an effort to provide Arnie an unspoiled summer before attending Fisk the next Fall, the Pembertons take Arnie on a trip to Europe. Upon meeting Claudina Lawrence, a Black starlet from Atlanta, in Paris, Arnie begins to find a community. The story ends with Arnie's decision to leave the Pembertons mid-trip and remain in Paris.

== "Little Dog" ==
"Little Dog" details the life of Miss Briggs, a lonely head bookkeeper living in New York. One summer, Miss Briggs buys a little white dog and names him "Flips." After bringing Flips home to her apartment, she enlists the help of her janitor, a young Swedish man, to deliver food for the dog. Miss Briggs' and Flips' routine is disrupted when Joe, a Black man, becomes the new janitor. Despite Joe's kindness and adherence to the food delivery routine, Miss Briggs finds herself uncomfortable and anxious around Joe. Ultimately, she and Flips move out of the apartment complex due to Miss Briggs' inability to reconcile her emotions.

== "Berry" ==
"Berry" describes Millberry Jones, a young uneducated Black man hired to work in the kitchen at an outpatient facility for disabled children. Berry realizes that he is overemployed and underpaid, and suspects that the sanatorium is defrauding its clients and the children in its care. Despite these conditions, Berry forms a close connection with the children. On a trip to the beach with the patients, Berry is blamed for carelessly allowing a child to fall from his wheelchair. Berry is immediately dismissed, without his pay.

== "Mother and Child" ==
"Mother and Child" depicts a group of Black women's discussion of a White woman and Black man in town's new baby. The birth is notable because the couple is interracial and the woman is married to another White man. The women express concerns over heightened racial tensions, and chatter amongst themselves as to what the future holds for the Ohio town and the couple. The story concludes with the beginning of the monthly meeting of Salvation Rock Ladies' Missionary Society for the Rescue of the African Heathen.

== "One Christmas Eve" ==
"One Christmas Eve" depicts Arcie and her five-year-old son's, Joe, Christmas Eve shopping trip. Arcie, intent on providing Joe an acceptable Christmas, does not notice when her son slips away to see Santa Claus in a nearby White-only movie theatre. Upon a fear-inducing encounter with Santa as the only Black child, Joe flees the store and eventually reunites with his mother. After Joe recounts his terrifying experience in the theatre, Arcie tells Joe that the man he met was not the real Santa—he was just an old White man.

== "Father and Son" ==
"Father and Son" is a story about Colonel Thomas Norwood and his half-Black son, Bert Lewis. Growing up, Bert constantly sought acknowledgement from the Colonel as his son. The Colonel's inability to recognize Bert as his child, coupled with a predisposition to mischief, pushes Bert to rebel throughout his childhood. This strained relationship between the two men continues into Bert's adulthood.

Tensions reach their height one summer after Bert returns to the Georgia plantation from college. The Colonel threatens to kill Bert after publicly correcting a young White bank teller for her incorrect counting of change. Before the Colonel can act, Bert strangles him and kills him.

Upon discovery of the Colonel's murder, a mob forms to punish Bert for his actions. Before the mob can kill him, however, Bert commits suicide with the help of Cora, his mother. The mob is unfulfilled by Bert's death, so they capture and lynch Willie, Bert's older brother. The evening papers report a double lynching of two plantation field hands for murdering Colonel Thomas Norwood, who left no heirs.

== Reception ==
=== Contemporary review ===
In September 1934 in his monthly column "The Literary Landscape" of the North American Review, Herschel Brickell described the collection as:

"Some of the best stories that have appeared in this country in years... the author is far and way the most talented member of his race who has ever written on his race."

=== Posthumous reviews ===
In September 1996, upon the publication of a comprehensive edition of Hughes's short stories entitled The Short Stories of Langston Hughes (ISBN 0-8090-1603-6), David Herbert Donald, in a review published by The New York Times, wrote:

"Hughes's short stories might occupy a larger place in American literature had they all lived up to the standard he set in The Ways of White Folks, written when he was under the immediate influence of D. H. Lawrence and when he was still a passionate socialist. He could not sustain the tone of those powerful, polemical pieces."
