= The American Collection =

The American Collection was a spinoff series of Masterpiece Theater, which ran from 2000 to 2003, for the former series' 30th anniversary. It was funded originally by Exxon Mobil (later Mobil); however, funding for both series was withdrawn in 2005. It aired on PBS. This was a widely acclaimed limited run program.

== History ==
This program featured film adaptations by renowned works by American literary giants, and debuted in October 2000. The films are produced by WGBH and ALT films.

== Theme music ==
The theme for this series was created by John Williams, and featured cellist Yo-Yo Ma. It can be listened to here:

== Title design ==
Karin Fong, Dana Yee and Grant Lau won a 2001 Primetime Emmy Award for Outstanding Main Title Design for their work on this series.

== Programs ==
- Thornton Wilder's Our Town
- Esmeralda Santiago's Almost a Woman
- James Agee's A Death in the Family
- Eudora Welty's The Ponder Heart
- Willa Cather's The Song of the Lark
- Henry James's The American
- Langston Hughes's Cora Unashamed (a short story from his 1934 collection The Ways of White Folks)
