= Not Without Laughter =

1930 novel by Langston Hughes

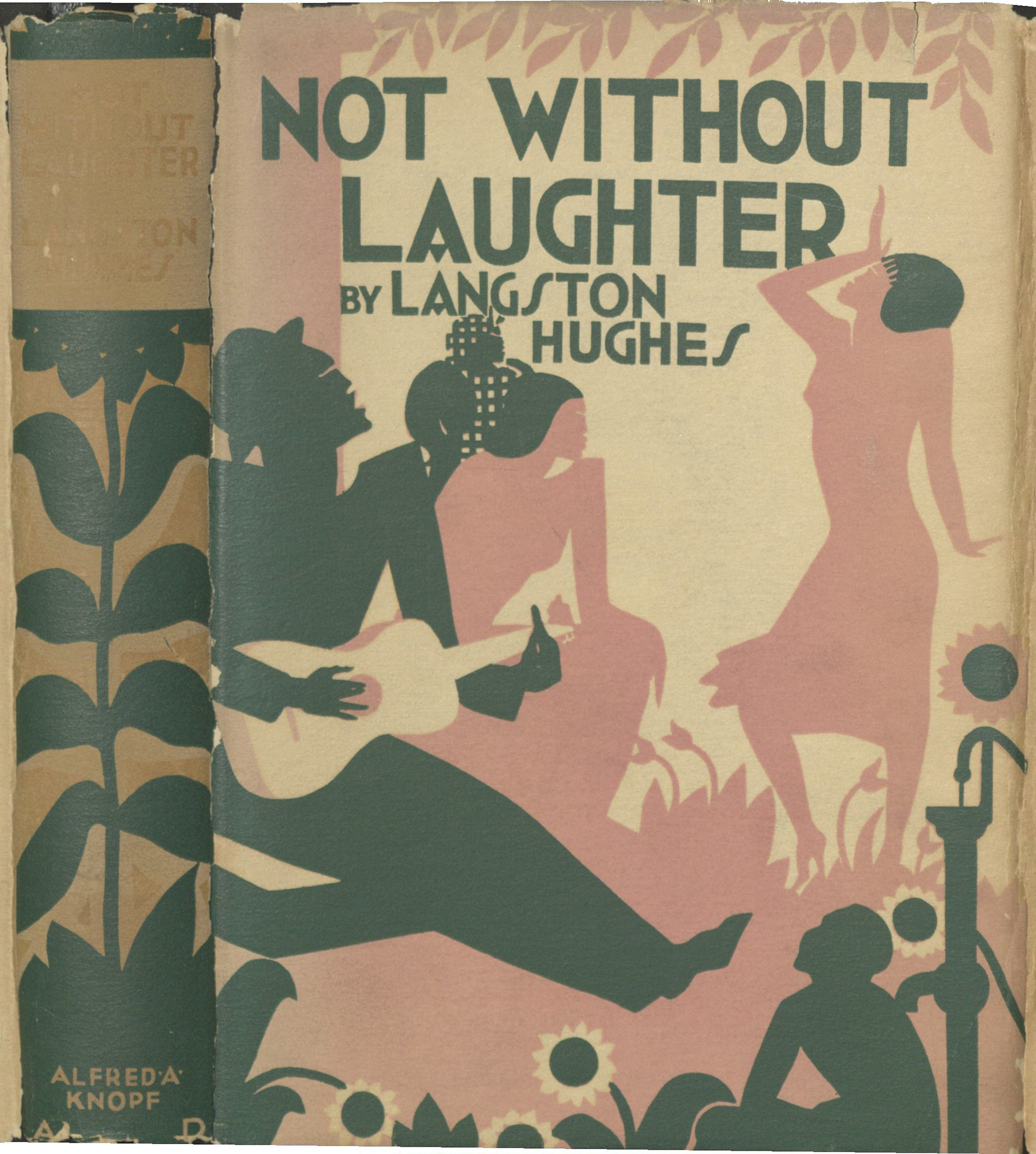
- Not Without Laughter cover (first edition)
- Author: Langston Hughes
- Cover artist: Aaron Douglas
- Language: English
- Genre: Coming-of-age novel
- Published: 1930 (Alfred A. Knopf)
- Publication place: United States
- Media type: Print (hardback)
- Pages: 324
- Dewey Decimal: 813.52
- LC Class: PS3515.U274
- Text: Not Without Laughter at Wikisource

Not Without Laughter is the 1930 debut novel of African-American author Langston Hughes. The story is semi-autobiographical, with its young hero Sandy Rodgers experiencing a Kansas childhood similar to Hughes' own. Although the novel received mixed reviews, it did win Hughes the Harmon Gold Award for Literature and helped establish his reputation as a promising new writer of the Harlem Renaissance.

== Synopsis ==
The novel is episodic and character-driven, rather than plot-driven. It covers the timespan 1912 to 1918, following James "Sandy" Rodgers as he awakens to the realities of black life in the town of Stanton, Kansas. The adults shaping Sandy's childhood are his grandmother (whom everyone calls Aunt Hager), his mother Annjee, his Aunt Harriet, and his wandering father Jimboy Rodgers.

During his formative years, Sandy "struggles to forge an identity outside of the boxes the white and black worlds have put him in, and tries to find stability within his increasingly unstable home." He initially dwells in a female-centric environment of his churchgoing Aunt Hager and mother Annjee. They do their best to shield him from the pain of racial discrimination and segregation in 1910s Kansas, but he still experiences it first-hand, for example, when he is turned away from a Free Children's Day Party at a new Stanton amusement park because it is whites-only.

When he gets older, Sandy obtains a job in a black barbershop, spends time in a pool hall, and gravitates toward the camaraderie of groups of black men. While listening to their boisterous, teasing discussions, he observes that "No matter how belligerent or lewd their talk was, or how sordid the tales they told—of dangerous pleasures and strange perversities—these black men laughed. That must be the reason, thought Sandy, why poverty-stricken old Negroes like Uncle Dan Givens lived so long—because to them, no matter how hard life might be, it was not without laughter."

== Background ==
In his 1940 autobiography The Big Sea, Hughes stated that Not Without Laughter was based on his upbringing in Lawrence, Kansas, but that he took artistic liberties when crafting the novel:

I wanted to write about a typical Negro family in the Middle West, about people like those I had known in Kansas. But mine was not a typical Negro family.... For purposes of the novel, however, I created around myself what seemed to me a family more typical of Negro life in Kansas than my own had been. I gave myself aunts that I didn't have, modeled after other children's aunts whom I had known. But I put in a real cyclone that had blown my grandmother's front porch away. And I added dances and songs I remembered. I brought the boy to Chicago in his teens, as I had come to Chicago.

Hughes completed the manuscript in his senior year at Lincoln University, and it was published shortly after he graduated. It would be his only published novel even as he went on to have a prolific career as a poet and author of plays, short story collections, and non-fiction works.

== Critical reception ==
Initial reviews of Not Without Laughter were mixed. The New York Times praised it for providing "an intimate picture of that type of Negro life which has been so popular with white writers in the recent decade". The review compared Hughes' work favorably to other fictional portrayals of the African-American experience such as In Abraham's Bosom, Scarlet Sister Mary, and The Walls of Jericho, asserting that Hughes had come to closer grips with his subject matter than his white contemporaries, and that he had "exploited material that is even more picturesque". The review criticized the novel for its pacing in the early chapters, describing it as "very slow, even tedious, reading", but indicated that the story later picks up speed and "moves as swiftly as a jazz rhythm".

The Crisis called it a well-written novel that was "realistic and close to human beings", but stated that "being a study of character rather than plot, it is not very strongly knit together and may not hold the sustained interests of most readers".

V. F. Calverton, writing for The Nation magazine, commended Hughes for depicting "the Negro in his most picturesque form" and noted how Not Without Laughter "continues the healthy note begun in Negro fiction by Claude McKay and Rudolph Fisher". However, Calverton criticized what he regarded as "defects of style and weaknesses of structure" in the novel. He also faulted the "pedestrian slowness" of the first third, asserting that the plot had "no high points of intensity to grip and overpower the reader". The Virgin Islands Daily News labeled it "one of the best" African-American novels, crediting its focus on the "laughing, aching heart of the black man".

At the 1930 Harmon Foundation Awards, Not Without Laughter won the gold medal for literature and a $400 prize. At the time, it was a sizable amount of money for Hughes and convinced him to strive to become a professional writer.

Retrospective assessments of the novel have been more uniformly positive. In 1989 in The New York Review of Books, Darryl Pinckney appreciated the nostalgic tone of the novel and the author's "determination to stick to the positive in the black folk legacy." In the Lawrence Journal-World in 2002, Maria Butler lauded Hughes for his "brilliant and lyrical use of prose" and his ability to draw sharp contrasts between characters. In The New York Times in 2018, Angela Flournoy wrote:

Not Without Laughter is a debut in the best of ways: It covers uncharted territory, it compels its readers to see part of the world anew, and it prizes exploration over pat conclusion. Hughes accesses the universal – how all of us love and dream and laugh and cry – by staying faithful to the particulars of his characters and their way of life.

Fluornoy added that Hughes "gives his readers and contemporaries a guide for careful consideration of the lives of everyday black people. Such a guide is still useful to readers and writers today. Perhaps now more than ever."
