= Harlem (poem) =

1951 poem by Langston Hughes

- by Langston Hughes
- First published in: Montage of a Dream Deferred
- Publication date: 1951
- Lines: 11

Harlem

What happens to a dream deferred?
Does it dry up
like a raisin in the sun?
Or fester like a sore—
And then run?
Does it stink like rotten meat?
Or crust and sugar over—
like a syrupy sweet?

Maybe it just sags
like a heavy load.

Or does it explode?

"Harlem" (also known as "A Dream Deferred") is a poem by Langston Hughes. These eleven lines ask, "What happens to a dream deferred?", providing reference to the African-American experience. It was published as part of a longer volume-length poem suite in 1951 called Montage of a Dream Deferred, but is often excerpted from the larger work. The play A Raisin in the Sun was titled after a line in the poem.

== Background ==
Langston Hughes was an American poet. Hughes was a prominent figure in the Harlem Renaissance and wrote poetry that focused on the Black experience in America. The poem was published in Hughes's book Montage of a Dream Deferred in 1951. The book includes over ninety poems that are divided into five sections. "Harlem" occurs in the fifth section, which is titled "Lenox Avenue Mural". The poems in the book were intended to be read as one long poem, but "Harlem" is often read by itself.

== Content ==
The first line of "Harlem" asks "What happens to a dream deferred?" and the following ten lines work to answer the question. Hughes first asks four questions (such as "Does it dry up/like a raisin in the sun?"), presents a conjecture ("Maybe it just sags/like a heavy load.") and ends with a final question ("Or does it explode?").

== Reception and analysis ==
Hughes's poems "Harlem", "Mother to Son", and "The Negro Speaks of Rivers" were described in the Encyclopedia of African-American Writing as "anthems of black America". Scott Challener, professor of English and American Studies, deemed the poem "one of the most influential poems of the 20th century."

"Harlem" is referenced in El sueño, a short story by Donato Ndongo-Bidyogo.

=== "A dream deferred" ===
The poem's central question has been described as "one of American poetry’s most famous questions". Scott Challener considers Hughes's questions to be "urgent, embodied questions" that presents imagery of neglect while "provoking the senses". He notes that "Dreams here are not these overexposed things per se but are imagined to be like them and subject to the same forces—they are both visceral and vulnerable, and altogether too much. Dreams, like history, hurt. By implication, they demand care—and all the work that care entails." Challener argues that the final line "Or does it explode?" is abrupt and dramatic, which could be emblematic of race riots such as the Harlem riot of 1935 and Harlem riot of 1943, but might also refer to movements of population like the Great Migration and breaking down of misconceptions. The scholar N. Michelle Murray notes that the dream itself is never named.

Hughes uses the "dream deferred" motif in several of his works, such as "Boogie 1AM" and "Good Morning."

== Legacy ==
The play A Raisin in the Sun was titled after the third line in Hughes's poem.
