= Jazz poetry =

Genre of poetry

Jazz poetry is poetry that "demonstrates jazz-like rhythm or the feel of improvisation" or poetry that takes jazz music, musicians, or the jazz milieu as its subject, and is designed to be performed. Some critics consider it a distinct genre though others consider the term to be merely descriptive.

Jazz poetry has long been something of an "outsider" art form that exists somewhere outside the mainstream, having been conceived in the 1920s by African Americans, maintained in the 1950s by counterculture poets like those of the Beat Generation, and adapted in modern times into hip-hop music and live poetry events known as poetry slams.

== Aesthetics ==
In his book Digitopia Blues – Race, Technology and the American Voice, poet and saxophonist John Sobol argues that jazz was a transformative vehicle for African-American self-empowerment whose dominant characteristic and purpose was a search for mastery of a language of power, undertaken by a historically enslaved oral people denied access to words of power. Sobol believes that poets who have felt constrained by the hegemony of the literate tradition have grasped an essential kinship with jazz as a realm of masterful oral power and have sought to mimic or recreate jazz modalities in their poetry, thus earning the description 'jazz poetry'.

== The Harlem Renaissance ==
Early jazz poetry did not mimic the sounds and improvisational spirit of jazz. Instead, it heavily referenced the musical form with allusions made to musicians, instruments, and locations key to the burgeoning jazz scene. Poets including Vachel Lindsay (who actually abhorred the "primitive" sound of jazz music) and Mina Loy wrote poetry in this vein. It was with the advent of the Harlem Renaissance that jazz poetry developed into what it is today..

Poets such as Langston Hughes incorporated the syncopated rhythms and repetitive phrases of blues and jazz music into their writing. Many Harlem Renaissance writers were deeply concerned with racial pride and with the creation of purely African-American poetry. Since jazz music was an important part of African-American culture at the time, Hughes and others like him adapted the musical genre to create their own, singularly African-American voices that could easily be distinguished from the work of white poets. Many of Hughes' poems, such as "The Weary Blues", sound almost exactly like popular jazz and blues songs of the period, and vice versa. His work is also highly evocative of spirituals.

== Bebop and the Beat Generation ==
As members of the Beat Generation began to embrace aspects of African-American culture during the 1950s, the art of jazz poetry shifted its focus from racial pride and individuality to spontaneity and freedom. In this case, both jazz poetry and jazz music were seen as powerful statements against the status quo.

Jack Kerouac would often have musical accompaniment for his poetry readings. His colleague, musician and composer David Amram, would often play the piano or bongos as Kerouac read. Amram later wrote of their work together:

We never once rehearsed. We did listen intently to one another. Jazz is all about listening and sharing. I never drowned out one word of whatever Jack was reading or making up on the spot. When I did my spontaneous scatting [...] he would play piano or bongos and he never drowned out or stepped on a word or interrupted a thought that I or anyone else had when they joined us in these late night-early morning get-togethers. We had mutual respect for one another, and anyone who joined us received the same respect. We almost never used a microphone. Most of the time, there weren't any available!

Lawrence Ferlinghetti had a similar collaboration with saxophone player Stan Getz. Beat poet Bob Kaufman was said by some to be the greatest jazz poet ever to have lived, with the exception of Langston Hughes. Kaufman paid homage to jazz in poems such as "O Jazz O" and "Morning Joy." His work is notable for its syncopated rhythms, surreal imagery, and a quality of alienation stemming from his own life as a drifter and a jailbird.

The New York poet Kenneth Koch collaborated with the painter Larry Rivers, who had worked as a jazz saxophonist, on poetry and jazz. Koch wrote later of the experience: "Last year Larry Rivers and I tried to kill poetry-and-jazz by parodying it; our first session at the Five Spot, however, turned out to be so enjoyable (for us, at least) that we repeated the experience several times. I don't think we killed it."

In the 1960s, Beat poet LeRoi Jones renamed himself Amiri Baraka and revived the idea of jazz poetry as a source of black pride. He collaborated on recordings with David Murray, such as "Evidence" on Murray's Fo Deuk Revue (1996). Baraka was a cultural nationalist who believed that "Black People are a race, a culture, a Nation". Elements of jazz show up often in Baraka's work, such as syncopation and repetition of phrases. Gil Scott-Heron, often seen as one of the founding fathers of rap music, also used many of the artistic devices of jazz poetry in his spoken-word albums of the 1970s and 1980s.
