= The Negro Speaks of Rivers =

Poem by Langston Hughes

- by Langston Hughes
- First published in: The Crisis
- Language: English
- Subject: Rivers
- Publication date: June 1921

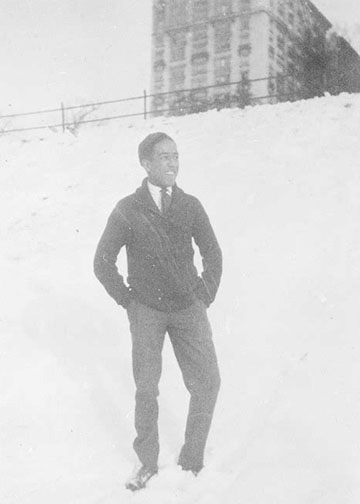
Langston Hughes in 1919 or 1920

"The Negro Speaks of Rivers" is a poem by American writer Langston Hughes. Hughes wrote the poem in 1920, when he was 17 years old and was crossing the Mississippi River on the way to visit his father in Mexico. The poem was first published in The Crisis magazine in June 1921, starting Hughes's literary career. "The Negro Speaks of Rivers" uses rivers as a metaphor for Hughes's life and the broader African-American experience. It has been reprinted often and is considered one of Hughes's most famous and signature works.

== Background ==
Langston Hughes was born in 1902 in Missouri. He attended high school in Cleveland, Ohio, where he first began writing. He graduated from Central High School in 1917. Several years later, Hughes decided to travel to Mexico City and live with his father, whom he did not know well. He left in 1920.

== Composition and publication history ==
Hughes said he wrote the poem in "ten or fifteen minutes" on "the back of an envelope" he had when he was 17 years old and was crossing the Mississippi River on the way to visit his father in Mexico. The poem was first published in The Crisis in June 1921, and was collected in The Weary Blues (1926). The poet Jessie Redmon Fauset, who was the literary editor of The Crisis, was responsible for the poem's initial acceptance and publication. In a review of The Weary Blues, Fauset wrote that after she read the poem, she brought it to W. E. B. Du Bois (the publisher of The Crisis) and said "What colored person is there, do you suppose, in the United States who writes like that and yet is unknown to us?" She found out who Hughes was and the poem was published.

Twenty years after its publication, Hughes suggested the poem be turned into a Hollywood film, but that never happened.

== Poem ==
I've known rivers:
I've known rivers ancient as the world and older than the
flow of human blood in human veins.

My soul has grown deep like the rivers.

I bathed in the Euphrates when dawns were young.
I built my hut near the Congo and it lulled me to sleep.
I looked upon the Nile and raised the pyramids above it.
I heard the singing of the Mississippi when Abe Lincoln
went down to New Orleans, and I've seen its muddy
bosom turn all golden in the sunset.

I've known rivers:
Ancient, dusky rivers.

My soul has grown deep like the rivers.

== Reception and analysis ==
"The Negro Speaks of Rivers" is one of Hughes's earliest poems and is considered to mark the beginning of his career as a poet. In the Encyclopedia of American Poetry, Sandra Merriweather calls the poem one of Hughes's best, and it has been called his "signature" poem. Harold Bloom called it of Hughes's "most uncharacteristic" poems. The professor Ira Dworkin called the poem "an iconic representative of Hughes and the Harlem Renaissance." Upon publication, it "delighted black traditionalists", who appreciated its message. In the Encyclopedia of African-American Writing, it and Hughes's poems "Mother to Son" and "Harlem" are described as "anthems of black America".

The poem uses rivers as a metaphor for Hughes's life and broader African-American history. It does not rhyme and uses lines, particularly "My soul has grown deep like the rivers", to say that, according to the professor Christopher C. De Santis, "experience and history, though often oppressive, have not extinguished but rather emboldened the development of a soul, the birth of an immortal self, the proud 'I' that now speaks to all who will listen." That line also alludes to W. E. B. Du Bois, who wrote The Souls of Black Folk in 1903. Hughes dedicated the poem to Du Bois when he republished it in The Weary Blues. The dedication came at Fauset's urging and was not included in subsequent printings.

Hughes wrote the poem while the Great Migration, a movement of African Americans from the Southern United States to Northern cities like Chicago, was ongoing. The scholar William Hogan places the poem in this context, noting that it "recognizes the need for a new kind of rootedness, one that embraced a history of migration and resettlement. Hogan argues that by connecting "communities of color across both space and time", Hughes is developing "a theory of racial community" that draws strength from migration and change. The "many 'routes' historically taken by black culture only strengthen the 'roots' of the community".

The scholar Allan Burns feels that the poem is written from the perspective of a "'soul' or 'consciousness' of black people in general" rather than Hughes himself. Burns also notes that the poem's progression of rivers, from the Euphrates to the Mississippi, follows a chronology of history "from the Garden of Eden [...] to modern America." By describing the "muddy bosom" of the river turning "golden in the sunset", Hughes provides a note of hope that Burns compares to the phrase per aspera ad astra ("through suffering to the stars"). Hughes had not traveled widely when he wrote the poem.

The scholar W. Jason Miller considers the poem an anti-lynching work, noting that Hughes lived during an era when he would have been affected by lynchings, particularly after the Red Summer of 1919, when numerous blacks were attacked and killed by whites. Miller notes that Hughes was probably intimidated as he traveled alone to visit his father in Mexico, passing through Texas, where numerous lynchings occurred. He adds that Hughes used the poem to provide reassurance "that because others have survived, he and his readers can survive too". Although the poem is titled with a verb in the present tense ("Speaks"), the text focuses on the past ("I've"). Miller feels this shows Hughes defining rivers as "part of a natural realm needing to be reclaimed as a site that African Americans have known and should now know."

In his early writing, including "The Negro Speaks of Rivers", Hughes was inspired by American poet Carl Sandburg. Rachel Blau DuPlessis argues that part of the poem reinterprets Vachel Lindsay's "The Congo" by portraying the Congo River as "a pastoral nourishing, maternal setting." Hughes references the spiritual "Deep River" in the line "My soul has grown deep like the rivers." The poem is also influenced by Walt Whitman.

== Impact and legacy ==
The poem has been cited as becoming "the voice of the Association [NAACP] itself", along with Jean Toomer's "Song of the Son" and Du Bois's editorials. One of Hughes's most reprinted works, it was printed at least 11 times within a decade of its first publication, including in the 1925 anthology The New Negro, the 1927 work Caroling Dusk, and Hughes's own The Dream Keeper (1932).

After Hughes died, his ashes were interred in the Schomburg Center for Research in Black Culture in Harlem under a cosmogram inspired by "The Negro Speaks of Rivers". The cosmogram is titled Rivers and was designed by Houston Conwill. In its center is the line "My soul has grown deep like the rivers".

The American composer Margaret Bonds set the poem for voice and piano in 1942.

The choreographer Pearl Primus developed a work based on the poem.

Gary Bartz's song "I've Known Rivers" is inspired by the poem.

Howard Swanson's 1942 musical setting of the poem was recorded by bass-baritone Odekhiren Amaize on his 1999 album "The Negro Speaks of Rivers" and Other Art Songs by African-American Composers.
