= Montage of a Dream Deferred =

Poem suite

Montage of a Dream Deferred is a book-length poem suite published by Langston Hughes in 1951. Its jazz poetry style focuses on scenes over the course of a 24-hour period in Harlem (a neighborhood of New York City) and its mostly African-American inhabitants. The original edition was 75 pages long and comprised 91 individually titled poems, which were intended to be read as a single long poem. Hughes' prefatory note for the book explained his intentions in writing the collection:

In terms of current Afro-American popular music and the sources from which it progressed—jazz, ragtime, swing, blues, boogie-woogie, and be-bop—this poem on contemporary Harlem, like be-bop, is marked by conflicting changes, sudden nuances, sharp and impudent interjections, broken rhythms, and passages sometimes in the manner of a jam session, sometimes the popular song, punctuated by the riffs, runs, breaks, and disc-tortions of the music of a community in transition.

The primary motif of the poem is the "dream deferred", represented in the opposition between Harlem of the 1950s and the rest of the world. The poem is characterized by its use of the montage, a cinematic technique of quickly cutting from one scene to another in order to juxtapose disparate images, and its use of contemporary jazz modes like boogie-woogie, bop and bebop, both as subjects in the individual short poems and as a method of structuring and writing the poetry. Its themes include the subjugation of the black community, African-American racial consciousness and history, and the need for social change to resolve the injustices faced by the residents of Harlem.

The poem is divided into five sections (although some editions contain six); each section represents a different time of day in Harlem, moving from dawn through the night to the dawn of the following day. The poem begins and ends with the same two lines: "Good morning, daddy! / Ain't you heard?" Montage of a Dream Deferred was Langston Hughes' first major publication following the end of World War II.

One of the most famous individual poems in the book are the eleven lines known as "Harlem".

== See also ==
- A Raisin in the Sun – named after a line from "Harlem"
