= Langston Hughes =

American writer and social activist (1901–1967)

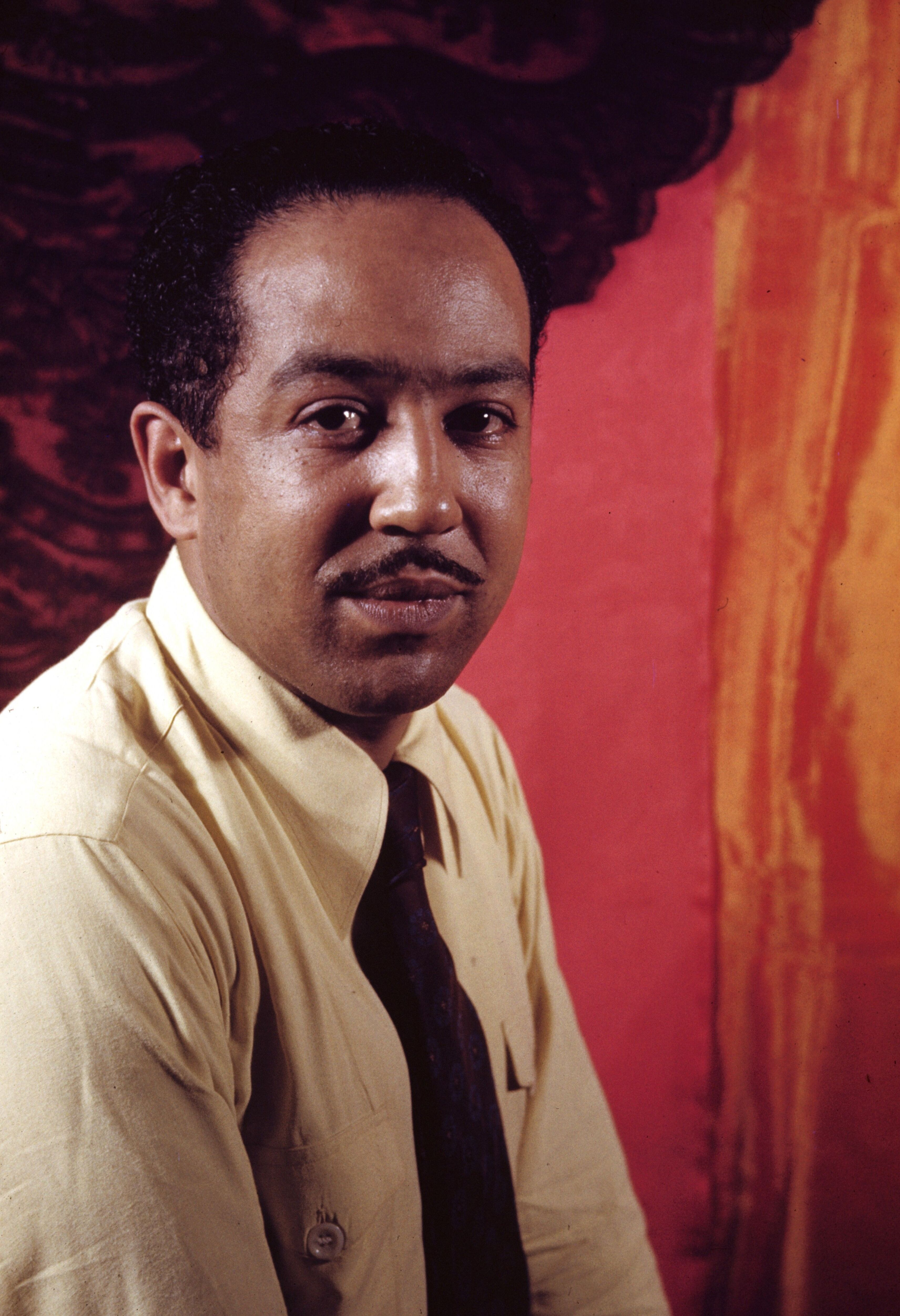
- Portrait by Carl Van Vechten, 1942
- Born: James Mercer Langston Hughes; February 1, 1901; Joplin, Missouri, U.S.
- Died: May 22, 1967 (aged 66); New York City, U.S.
- Education: Columbia University; Lincoln University (BA)
- Occupations: Poet; columnist; dramatist; essayist; novelist
- Relatives: Charles Henry Langston (grandfather); Mary Sampson Patterson Leary Langston (grandmother); John Mercer Langston (great-uncle)
- Writing career
- Period: 1926–1964

James Mercer Langston Hughes (February 1, 1901 – May 22, 1967) was an American poet, social activist, novelist, playwright, and columnist from Joplin, Missouri. An early innovator of jazz poetry, Hughes is best known as a leader of the Harlem Renaissance.

Growing up in the Midwest, Hughes became a prolific writer at an early age. He moved to New York City as a young man, where he made his career. He studied at Columbia University in New York City. Although he dropped out, he gained notice from New York publishers, first in The Crisis magazine and then from book publishers, subsequently becoming known in the Harlem creative community. His first poetry collection, The Weary Blues, was published in 1926. Hughes eventually graduated from Lincoln University.

In addition to poetry, Hughes wrote plays and published short story collections, novels, and several nonfiction works. From 1942 to 1962, as the civil rights movement gained traction, Hughes wrote an in-depth weekly opinion column in a leading black newspaper, The Chicago Defender.

== Ancestry and childhood ==
Like many African Americans, Hughes was of mixed ancestry. Both of his paternal great-grandmothers were enslaved Africans, and both of his paternal great-grandfathers were white slave owners in Kentucky. According to Hughes, one of these men was Sam Clay, a Scottish-American whiskey distiller from Henry County, said to be a relative of statesman Henry Clay. The other putative paternal ancestor whom Hughes named was Silas Cushenberry of Clark County, whom Hughes claimed was Jewish. Hughes's maternal grandmother, Mary Patterson, was of African-American, French, English and Native American descent. One of the first women to attend Oberlin College, she married Lewis Sheridan Leary, also of mixed-race descent, before her studies. In 1859, Lewis Leary joined John Brown's raid on Harpers Ferry in West Virginia, where he was fatally wounded.

Ten years later, in 1869, the widow Mary Patterson Leary married again, into the elite, politically active Langston family. Her second husband was Charles Henry Langston, of African-American, Euro-American and Native American ancestry. He and his younger brother, John Mercer Langston, worked for the abolitionist cause and helped lead the Ohio Anti-Slavery Society in 1858.

After their marriage, Charles Langston moved with his family to Kansas, where he was active as an educator and activist for voting and rights for African Americans. His and Mary's daughter Caroline (known as Carrie) became a schoolteacher and married James Nathaniel Hughes. They had two children; the second was Langston Hughes, born in 1901 in Joplin, Missouri (though Hughes himself claims in his autobiography to have been born in 1902).

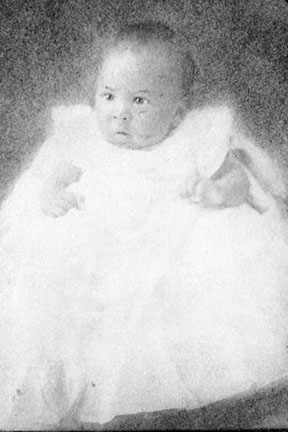
Hughes in 1902

Langston Hughes spent most of his childhood in Lawrence, Kansas, with shorter periods in other Midwestern cities. His parents separated shortly after his birth, largely because his father wanted to escape the racial intolerance of the United States by moving first to Cuba, and later to Mexico. After the separation, Hughes's mother travelled frequently in search of work, and he was raised primarily by his maternal grandmother, Mary Patterson Langston. Through stories of Black resistance, dignity, and perseverance, Mary shaped his understanding of racial responsibility.

Imbued by his grandmother with a duty to help his race, Hughes identified with neglected and downtrodden black people all his life, and centered their lives honestly in his work. He lived most of his childhood in Lawrence. Hughes later recalled that his childhood was marked by loneliness, writing in The Big Sea (1940): "I was unhappy for a long time, and very lonesome, living with my grandmother. Then it was that books began to happen to me…"

After the death of his grandmother, Hughes went to live with family friends, James and Auntie Mary Reed, for two years. Later, Hughes lived again with his mother Carrie in Lincoln, Illinois. She had remarried when he was an adolescent. The family moved to the Fairfax neighborhood of Cleveland, Ohio, where he attended Central High School and was taught by Helen Maria Chesnutt, whom he found inspiring.

His writing experiments began when he was young. While in grammar school in Lincoln, Hughes was elected class poet. He stated that in retrospect he thought it was because of the stereotype about African Americans having rhythm.

I was a victim of a stereotype. There were only two of us Negro kids in the whole class and our English teacher was always stressing the importance of rhythm in poetry. Well, everyone knows, except us, that all Negroes have rhythm, so they elected me as class poet.

During high school in Cleveland, Hughes wrote for the school newspaper, edited the yearbook, and began to write his first short stories, poetry, and dramatic plays. His first piece of jazz poetry, "When Sue Wears Red", was written while he was in high school. Hughes class teacher introduced him to the poet Carl Sandburg, which inspired him to write poetry.

== Education ==
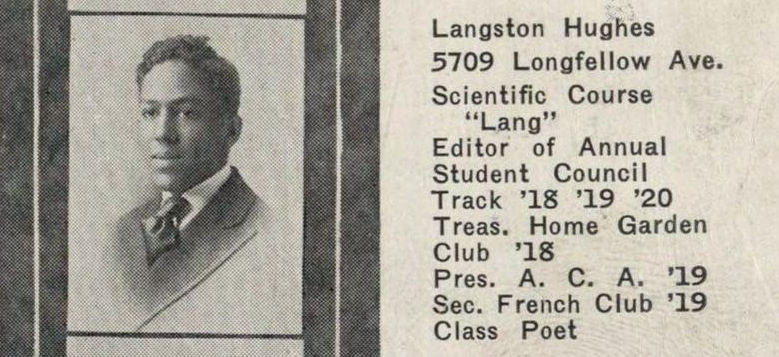
Hughes in the Central High School yearbook, 1920

Hughes had a very poor relationship with his father, whom he seldom saw when a child. He lived briefly with his father in Mexico in 1919. Upon graduating from high school in June 1920, Hughes returned to Mexico to live with his father, hoping to convince him to support his plan to attend Columbia University. Hughes later said that, prior to arriving in Mexico, "I had been thinking about my father and his strange dislike of his own people. I didn't understand it, because I was a Negro, and I liked Negroes very much." His father had hoped Hughes would choose to study at a university abroad and train for a career in engineering. He was willing to provide financial assistance to his son on these grounds, but did not support his desire to be a writer. Eventually, Hughes and his father came to a compromise: Hughes would study engineering, so long as he could attend Columbia. His tuition provided, Hughes left his father after more than a year and enrolled at Columbia University in September 1921.

While at Columbia in 1921, Hughes managed to maintain a B+ grade average. He published poetry in the Columbia Daily Spectator under a pen name. Hughes preferred to visit Broadway productions and attend lectures at the Rand School, leading to him dropping out of Columbia in 1922. Additionally, he had suffered racial prejudice among students and teachers. He was denied a room on campus because he was Black. Eventually he settled in Hartley Hall, but he still suffered from racism among his classmates, who seemed hostile to anyone who did not fit into a WASP category. He was attracted more to the African-American people and neighborhood of Harlem than to his studies, but he continued writing poetry.

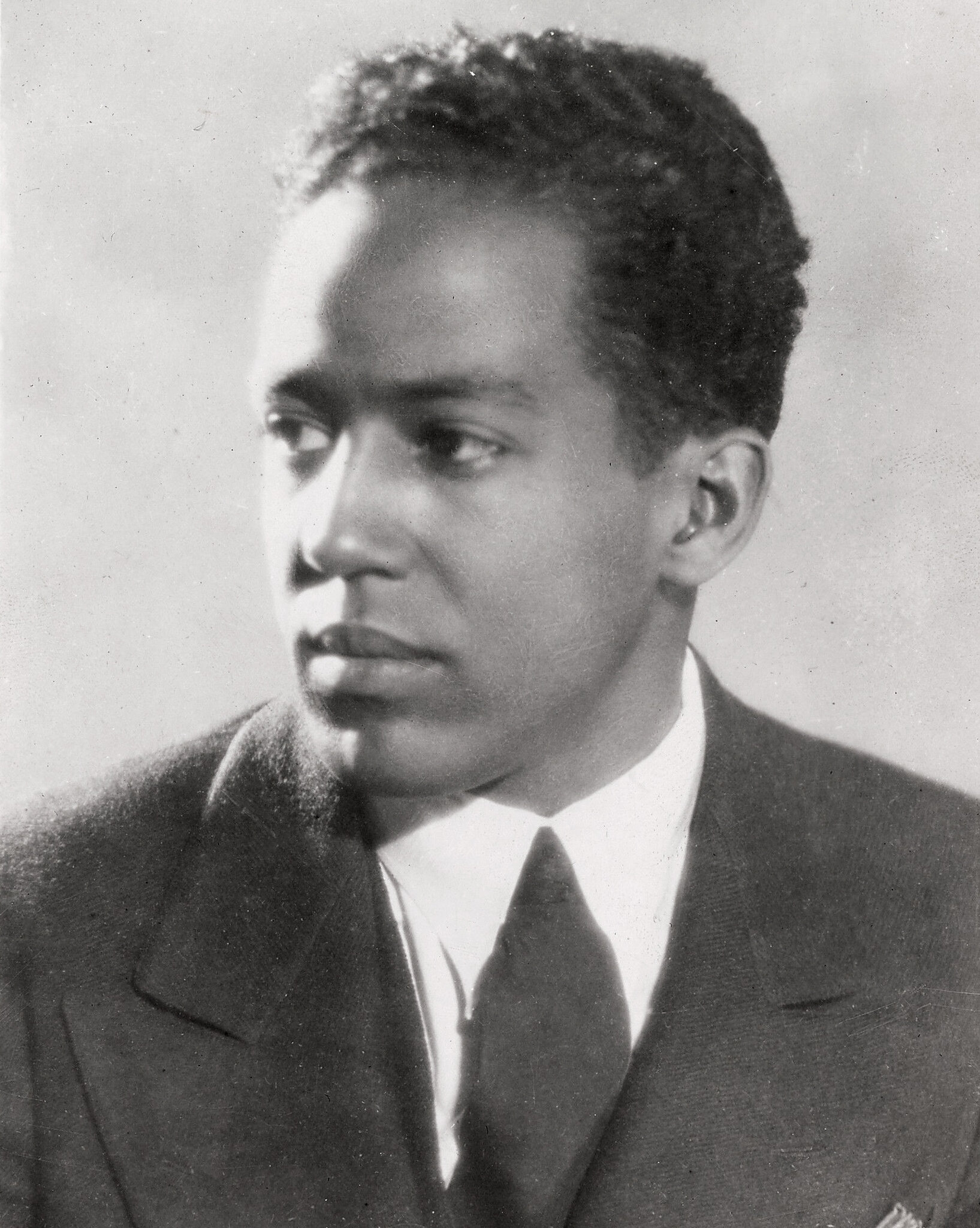
Hughes c. 1925

Hughes worked at various odd jobs before serving a brief tenure as a crewman aboard the S.S. Malone in 1923, spending six months traveling to West Africa and Europe. In Europe, Hughes left the S.S. Malone for a temporary stay in Paris. There he met and had a romance with Anne Marie Coussey, a British-educated African from a well-to-do Gold Coast family; they subsequently corresponded, but she eventually married Hugh Wooding, a promising Trinidadian lawyer. Wooding later served as chancellor of the University of the West Indies.

During his time in England in the early 1920s, Hughes became part of the black expatriate community. In November 1924, he returned to the U.S. to live with his mother in Washington, D.C. After assorted odd jobs, he gained white-collar employment in 1925 as a personal assistant to historian Carter G. Woodson at the Association for the Study of African American Life and History. As the work demands limited his time for writing, Hughes quit the position to work as a busboy at the Wardman Park Hotel. Hughes's earlier work had been published in magazines and was about to be collected into his first book of poetry when he encountered poet Vachel Lindsay, with whom he shared some poems. Impressed, Lindsay publicized his discovery of a new black poet.

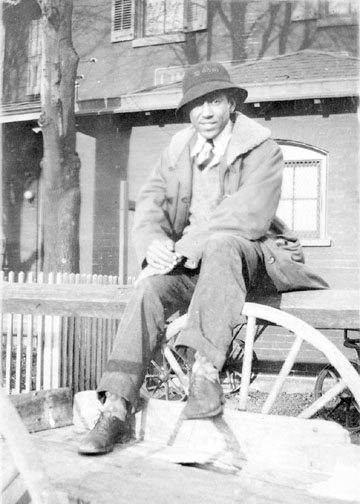
Hughes at Lincoln University, 1928

The following year, Hughes enrolled in Lincoln University, a historically black university in Chester County, Pennsylvania. He was supported financially with his education at Lincoln by Mrs Joel Spingarn, the sister in law of Arthur Spingarn, a close friend and attorney. He joined the Omega Psi Phi fraternity.

After Hughes earned a B.A. degree from Lincoln University in 1929, he returned to New York. Except for travels to the Soviet Union and parts of the Caribbean, he lived in Harlem as his primary home for the remainder of his life. During the 1930s, he became a resident of Westfield, New Jersey for a time, sponsored by his patron Charlotte Osgood Mason.

== Sexuality ==
Some academics and biographers believe that Hughes was homosexual or bisexual and included homosexual codes in many of his poems, as did Walt Whitman, who Hughes said influenced his poetry. Hughes's story "Blessed Assurance" deals with a father's anger over his son's effeminacy and "queerness". Additionally, Sandra L. West, author of the Encyclopedia of the Harlem Renaissance, contends that his homosexual love of Black men is evidenced in a number of reported unpublished poems to an alleged Black male lover. The biographer Aldrich argues that, in order to retain the respect and support of Black churches and organizations and to avoid exacerbating his precarious financial situation, Hughes remained closeted. Hughes's poem 'Café: 3 AM' is a criticism of anti-queer sentiment, which can be interpreted either as a reflection of personal experience or allyship with queer communities. In his 1989 film Looking for Langston, Isaac Julien explores the notion of Hughes being homosexual.

Hughes' primary biographer Arnold Rampersad concludes that the author was probably asexual and passive in his sexual relationships, despite noting that he exhibited a preference for African-American men in his work and life, finding them "sexually fascinating".

Hughes is sometimes viewed as a queer figure; however, his queerness has not been confirmed and is a subject of ongoing debate. His sexuality remains unknown, though some say his works, behavior, and interests indicate homosexuality.

== Career ==
from "The Negro Speaks of Rivers" (1920)
...
My soul has grown deep like the rivers.

I bathed in the Euphrates when dawns were young.
I built my hut near the Congo and it lulled me to sleep.
I looked upon the Nile and raised the pyramids above it.
I heard the singing of the Mississippi when Abe Lincoln
went down to New Orleans, and I've seen its muddy
bosom turn all golden in the sunset. ...

— in The Weary Blues (1926)

First published in 1921 in The Crisis, the official magazine of the National Association for the Advancement of Colored People (NAACP), "The Negro Speaks of Rivers" became Hughes's signature poem and was collected in his first book of poetry, The Weary Blues (1926). Hughes's first and last published poems appeared in The Crisis; more of his poems were published in The Crisis than in any other journal. Hughes's life and work were enormously influential during the Harlem Renaissance of the 1920s, alongside those of his contemporaries: Zora Neale Hurston, Wallace Thurman, Claude McKay, Countee Cullen, Richard Bruce Nugent, and Aaron Douglas. Except for McKay, they worked together also to create the short-lived magazine Fire!! Devoted to Younger Negro Artists.

Hughes and his contemporaries had different goals and aspirations than the black middle class. Hughes and his fellows tried to depict the "low-life" in their art, that is, the real lives of blacks in the lower social-economic strata. They criticized the divisions and prejudices within the black community based on skin color. Hughes wrote what would be considered their manifesto, "The Negro Artist and the Racial Mountain", published in The Nation in 1926:

The younger Negro artists who create now intend to express our individual dark-skinned selves without fear or shame. If white people are pleased we are glad. If they are not, it doesn't matter. We know we are beautiful. And ugly, too. The tom-tom cries, and the tom-tom laughs. If colored people are pleased we are glad. If they are not, their displeasure doesn't matter either. We build our temples for tomorrow, strong as we know how, and we stand on top of the mountain free within ourselves.

The first time that Hughes Langston mentioned the Southern U.S in one of his poems was as far back as in June 1922, when, in an issue of "The Crisis", Hughes published a poem called "The South". The poem conveyed how Hughes initially saw the region and its people, describing them as lazy and stupid, thus embracing stereotypes of the time. This perspective was soon to change in a very important and significantly impactful voyage to the South.

In the spring of 1927, he was asked to perform his poems at Fisk University, a historically black university in Nashville, and at a Young Women's Christian Association convention in Texas. He happily accepted the requests as he saw it as an opportunity to travel to the Southern U.S. and more specifically to document and learn about the lives of the people of color located in the area. His travel would be financially supported by Charlotte Osgood Mason who wanted him to get info regarding the local folk culture. Osgood Mason and Langston later had a falling out due to Osgood's perspectives on black people, to the point he would later hint in his 1939 poem "Poet to Patron".

He was astonished by the way people of color endured racism and their life conditions in the Southern U.S. during his travel. He also had to face racism himself during his visit.

During this travel Langston met, on July 23, 1927, Zora Neale Hurston on a Passenger Terminal in Mobile, Alabama. Because Zora owned a car, they both decided to travel together and document folk songs and local behaviors of black people in the south.

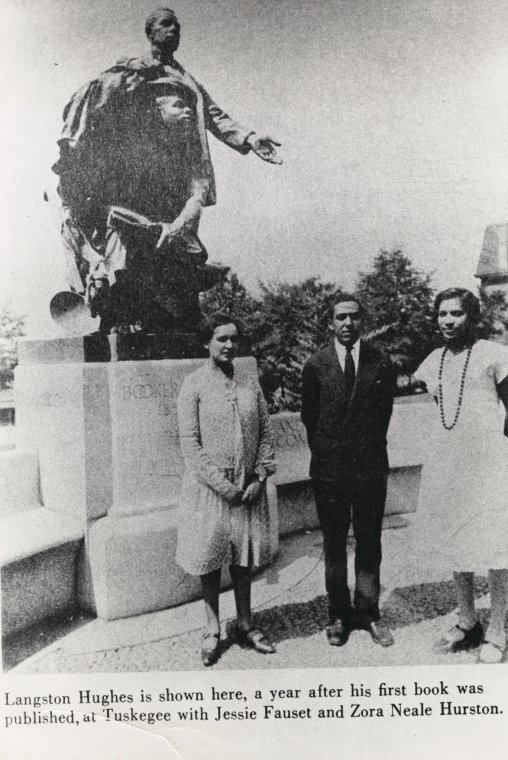
Langston Hughes at Tuskegee Institute with Jessie Fauset (left) and Zora Neale Hurston, 1927.

During this trip he visited the Tuskegee Institute alongside Zora, where they met with writer Jessie Fauset, posing them in a historical photo in front of Booker T. Washington Sr.'s grave within the campus. During their stay, Langston was specifically asked by the university to write a poem that would be used as an anthem for the institute and as a way to honour Washington's memory. The requested work would only be published in 1928, and sent to the university under the name of "Alabama Earth".

They met various other important figures, such as: the relatives of Jean Toomer in Georgia (and visited the plantation that inspired his work known as "Cane" [1923]). But more importantly, the two met Bessie Smith in Macon. The notes that Langston had gathered during his encounter with Bessie and the ones taken beforehand regarding the local folklore helped him in the making of the novel "Not Without Laughter (1930)" and the play he had written alongside Hurston named "Mule Bone". Another notable encounter was with a person that went by the name of Ed Pinkney, who was an escaped chain-prisoner; This encounter would be recounted in a document wrote by Langston known as "Foreword from Life".

This trip also inspired some other of his works, such as "The Book of Negro Folklore" (which he edited with the help of Arna Bontemps), "Montage of Dream Deferred" (where his studies on local folklore came into play).

After passing through South Carolina and crossing the Mason-Dixon line they both returned to the city of New York.

The trip would have a significant impact on Langston, changing his view regarding the south but also made him a more mature and experienced person and even writer.

His poetry and fiction portrayed the lives of the working-class blacks in America, lives he portrayed as full of struggle, joy, laughter, and music. Permeating his work is pride in the African-American identity and its diverse culture. "My seeking has been to explain and illuminate the Negro condition in America and obliquely that of all human kind", Hughes is quoted as saying. He confronted racial stereotypes, protested social conditions, and expanded African America's image of itself; a "people's poet" who sought to reeducate both audience and artist by lifting the theory of the black aesthetic into reality.

The night is beautiful,
So the faces of my people.

The stars are beautiful,
So the eyes of my people

Beautiful, also, is the sun.
Beautiful, also, are the souls of my people.

— "My People" in The Crisis (October 1923)

Hughes stressed a racial consciousness and cultural nationalism devoid of self-hate. His thought united people of African descent and Africa across the globe to encourage pride in their diverse black folk culture and black aesthetic. Hughes was one of the few prominent black writers to champion racial consciousness as a source of inspiration for black artists. His African-American race consciousness and cultural nationalism would influence many foreign black writers, including Jacques Roumain, Nicolás Guillén, Léopold Sédar Senghor, and Aimé Césaire. Along with the works of Senghor, Césaire, and other French-speaking writers of Africa and of African descent from the Caribbean, such as René Maran from Martinique and Léon Damas from French Guiana in South America, the works of Hughes helped to inspire the Négritude movement in France. A radical black self-examination was emphasized in the face of European colonialism. In addition to his example in social attitudes, Hughes had an important technical influence by his emphasis on folk and jazz rhythms as the basis of his poetry of racial pride.

In 1930, his first novel, Not Without Laughter, won the Harmon Gold Medal for literature. At a time before widespread arts grants, Hughes gained the support of private patrons and he was supported for two years prior to publishing this novel. The protagonist of the story is a boy named Sandy, whose family must deal with a variety of struggles due to their race and class, in addition to relating to one another.

In 1931, Hughes helped form the "New York Suitcase Theater" with playwright Paul Peters, artist Jacob Burck, and writer (soon-to-be underground spy) Whittaker Chambers, an acquaintance from Columbia. In 1932, he was part of a board to produce a Soviet film on "Negro Life" with Malcolm Cowley, Floyd Dell, and Chambers.

In 1931, Prentiss Taylor and Langston Hughes created the Golden Stair Press, issuing broadsides and books featuring the artwork of Prentiss Taylor and the texts of Langston Hughes. In 1932 they issued The Scottsboro Limited based on the trial of the Scottsboro Boys.

In 1932, Hughes and Ellen Winter wrote a pageant to Caroline Decker in an attempt to celebrate her work with the striking coal miners of the Harlan County War, but it was never performed. It was judged to be a "long, artificial propaganda vehicle too complicated and too cumbersome to be performed."

Maxim Lieber became his literary agent, 1933–1945 and 1949–1950. (Chambers and Lieber worked in the underground together around 1934–1935.)

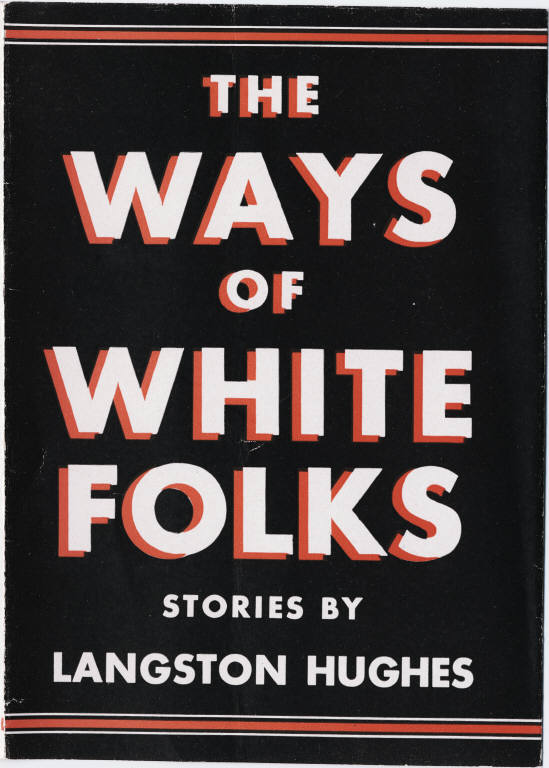
The Ways of White Folks, Hughes's first short story collection

Hughes's first collection of short stories was published in 1934 with The Ways of White Folks. He finished the book at "Ennesfree" a Carmel-by-the-Sea, California, cottage provided for a year by Noel Sullivan, another patron since 1933. These stories are a series of vignettes revealing the humorous and tragic interactions between whites and blacks. Overall, they are marked by a general pessimism about race relations, as well as a sardonic realism.

He also became an advisory board member to the (then) newly formed San Francisco Workers' School (later the California Labor School). In 1935, Hughes received a Guggenheim Fellowship. The same year that Hughes established his theatre troupe in Los Angeles, he realized an ambition related to films by co-writing the screenplay for Way Down South, co-written with Clarence Muse, African-American Hollywood actor and musician. Hughes believed his failure to gain more work in the lucrative movie trade was due to racial discrimination within the industry.

In 1937 Hughes wrote the long poem, Madrid, his reaction to an assignment to write about black Americans volunteering in the Spanish Civil War. His poem, accompanied by 9 etchings evoking the pathos of the Spanish Civil War by Canadian artist Dalla Husband, was published in 1939 as a hardcover book Madrid 1937, printed by Gonzalo Moré, Paris, intended to be an edition of 50. One example of the book, Madrid 37, signed in pencil and annotated as II [Roman numeral two] has appeared on the rare book market.

In Chicago, Hughes founded The Skyloft Players in 1941, which sought to nurture black playwrights and offer theatre "from the black perspective." Soon thereafter, he was hired to write a column for the Chicago Defender, in which he presented some of his "most powerful and relevant work", giving voice to black people. The column ran for twenty years. Hughes also mentored writer Richard Durham who would later produce a sequence about Hughes in the radio series Destination Freedom.

In 1943, Hughes began publishing stories about a character he called Jesse B. Semple, often referred to and spelled "Simple", the everyday black man in Harlem who offered musings on topical issues of the day. Although Hughes seldom responded to requests to teach at colleges, in 1947 he taught at Atlanta University. In 1949, he spent three months at the University of Chicago Laboratory Schools as a visiting lecturer. Between 1942 and 1949, Hughes was a frequent writer and served on the editorial board of Common Ground, a literary magazine focused on cultural pluralism in the United States published by the Common Council for American Unity (CCAU).

He wrote novels, short stories, plays, poetry, operas, essays, and works for children. With the encouragement of his best friend and writer, Arna Bontemps, and patron and friend, Carl Van Vechten, he wrote two volumes of autobiography, The Big Sea and I Wonder as I Wander, as well as translating several works of literature into English. With Bontemps, Hughes co-edited the 1949 anthology The Poetry of the Negro, described by The New York Times as "a stimulating cross-section of the imaginative writing of the Negro" that demonstrates "talent to the point where one questions the necessity (other than for its social evidence) of the specialization of 'Negro' in the title".

In 1949, alongside Anna Bontempts he edited the anthology of "The Poetry of the Negro 1746-1949", which was hailed as the "most comprehensive and valuable collection of its kind".

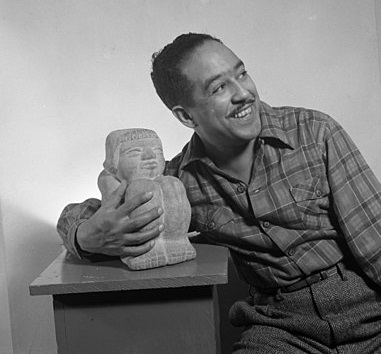
Langston Hughes, 1943. Photo by Gordon Parks

From the mid-1950s to the mid-1960s, Hughes's popularity among the younger generation of black writers varied even as his reputation increased worldwide. With the gradual advance toward racial integration, many black writers considered his writings of black pride and its corresponding subject matter out of date. They considered him a racial chauvinist. He found some new writers, among them James Baldwin, lacking in such pride, over-intellectual in their work, and occasionally vulgar.

Hughes wanted young black writers to be objective about their race, but not to scorn it or flee it. He understood the main points of the Black Power movement of the 1960s, but believed that some of the younger black writers who supported it were too angry in their work. Hughes's work Panther and the Lash, posthumously published in 1967, was intended to show solidarity with these writers, but with more skill and devoid of the most virulent anger and racial chauvinism some showed toward whites.

Hughes continued to have admirers among the larger younger generation of black writers. He often helped writers by offering advice and introducing them to other influential persons in the literature and publishing communities. This latter group, including Alice Walker, whom Hughes discovered, looked upon Hughes as a hero and an example to be emulated within their own work. One of these young black writers (Loften Mitchell) observed of Hughes:

Langston set a tone, a standard of brotherhood and friendship and cooperation, for all of us to follow. You never got from him, 'I am the Negro writer,' but only 'I am a Negro writer.' He never stopped thinking about the rest of us.

== Political views ==
Hughes's political writings in the 1930s often engaged with left-wing and Communist-aligned ideas, and several of his lesser-known political works were collected in volumes published by the University of Missouri Press. One example cited by historians is his poem "A New Song", which reflects themes of class struggle and solidarity.

In 1932, Langston Hughes traveled to the Soviet Union as part of a group of African Americans invited to participate in a proposed film depicting the conditions of Black life in the United States. Hughes was hired to work on the English dialogue for the film. The project was later abandoned, though the group was not formally informed of the reasons for its cancellation.

After the film project ended, Hughes remained in the Soviet Union and traveled extensively through several Soviet-controlled regions, including parts of Central Asia that were generally inaccessible to Western visitors. During this time, he met Robert Robinson, an African American living in Moscow who was unable to leave the country. Hughes also encountered European writers and intellectuals during his travels. These experiences contributed to his broader understanding of racial and economic conditions outside the United States. In Turkmenistan, Hughes met and befriended the Hungarian author Arthur Koestler, then a Communist who was given permission to travel there.

Hughes also managed to travel to China, Japan, and Korea before returning to the States.

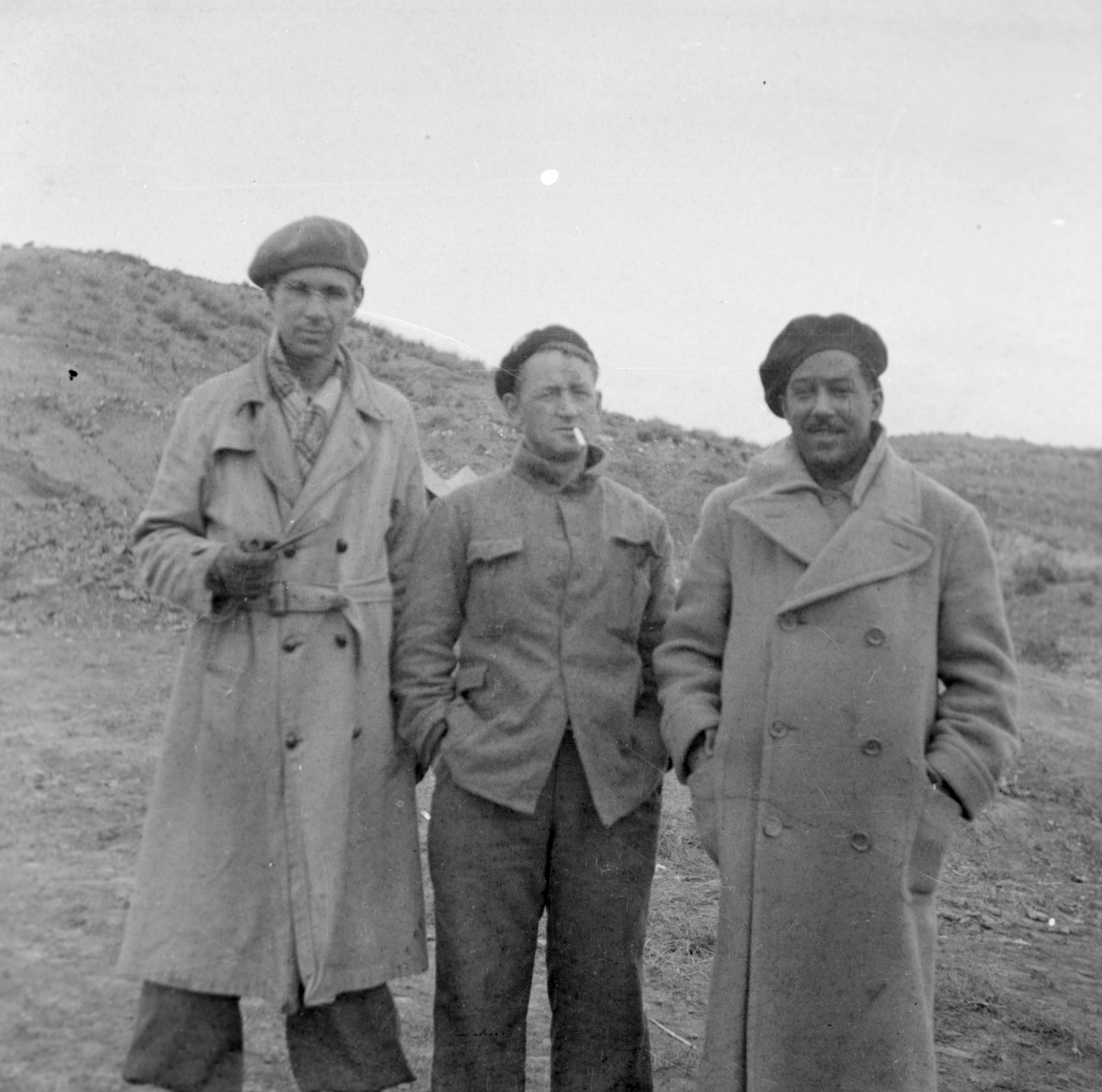
Hughes (right) with two Lincoln Brigade soldiers in Fuentes, October 1937

Hughes's poetry was frequently published in the CPUSA newspaper and he was involved in initiatives supported by Communist organizations, such as the drive to free the Scottsboro Boys. Partly as a show of support for the Republican faction during the Spanish Civil War, in 1937 Hughes traveled to Spain as a correspondent for the Baltimore Afro-American and other various African-American newspapers.

In August 1937, he broadcast live from Madrid alongside Harry Haywood and Walter Benjamin Garland. When Hughes was in Spain a Spanish Republican cultural magazine, El Mono Azul, featured Spanish translations of his poems. On August 29, 1937, Hughes wrote a poem titled Roar, China! which called for China's resistance to the full-scale invasion which Japan had launched less than two months earlier. Hughes used China as a metonym for the "global colour line". According to academic Gao Yunxiang, Hughes's poem was integral to the global circulation of Roar, China! as an artistic theme. In November 1937, Hughes departed Spain for which El Mono Azul published a brief farewell message entitled "el gran poeta de raza negra" ("the great poet of the black race").

Hughes was also involved in other Communist-led organizations such as the John Reed Clubs and the League of Struggle for Negro Rights. He was more of a sympathizer than an active participant. He signed a 1938 statement supporting Joseph Stalin's purges and joined the American Peace Mobilization in 1940 working to keep the U.S. from participating in World War II.

Hughes initially did not favor black American involvement in the war because of the persistence of discriminatory U.S. Jim Crow laws and racial segregation and disfranchisement throughout the South. He came to support the war effort and black American participation after deciding that war service would aid their struggle for civil rights at home. The scholar Anthony Pinn has noted that Hughes, together with Lorraine Hansberry and Richard Wright, was a humanist "critical of belief in God. They provided a foundation for nontheistic participation in social struggle." Pinn has found that such writers are sometimes ignored in the narrative of American history that chiefly credits the civil rights movement to the work of affiliated Christian people. During World War II, Hughes became a proponent of the Double V campaign; the double Vs referred to victory over Hitler abroad and victory over Jim Crow domestically.

Hughes was accused of being a Communist by many on the political right, but he always denied it. When asked why he never joined the Communist Party, he wrote, "it was based on strict discipline and the acceptance of directives that I, as a writer, did not wish to accept." In 1953, he was called before the Senate Permanent Subcommittee on Investigations led by Senator Joseph McCarthy. He stated, "I never read the theoretical books of socialism or communism or the Democratic or Republican parties for that matter, and so my interest in whatever may be considered political has been non-theoretical, non-sectarian, and largely emotional and born out of my own need to find some way of thinking about this whole problem of myself."

Following his testimony, Hughes distanced himself from Communism. He was rebuked by some on the radical left who had previously supported him. He moved away from overtly political poems and towards more lyric subjects. When selecting his poetry for his Selected Poems (1959) he excluded all his radical socialist verse from the 1930s. These critics on the Left were unaware of the secret interrogation that took place days before the televised hearing.

== Death and legacy ==
On May 22, 1967, at the age of 66, Hughes died at the Stuyvesant Polyclinic in New York City from complications following abdominal surgery related to prostate cancer. His ashes are interred beneath a floor medallion in the foyer of the Schomburg Center for Research in Black Culture in Harlem. It is the entrance to an auditorium named for him. The design on the floor is an African cosmogram entitled Rivers. The title is taken from his poem "The Negro Speaks of Rivers". Within the center of the cosmogram is the line: "My soul has grown deep like the rivers".

Hughes had a close relationship with poet Margaret Danner; he included her work in his anthology "New Negro Poets" and he worked with her later in his career. Following Hughes death Danner published the audio recording of "Poets of Revolution" in 1970.

Hughes's home in Harlem gained landmark status in 1981 and was registered as a historic place in 1982. His home is now a museum to celebrate his impact on the American literature and black culture. It is intended to be an educational and cultural center where artists, scholars and the community can come together.

In South Fulton, Georgia, the Langston Hughes High School was completed in 2009; and opened its doors in August 2009.

== Representation in other media ==
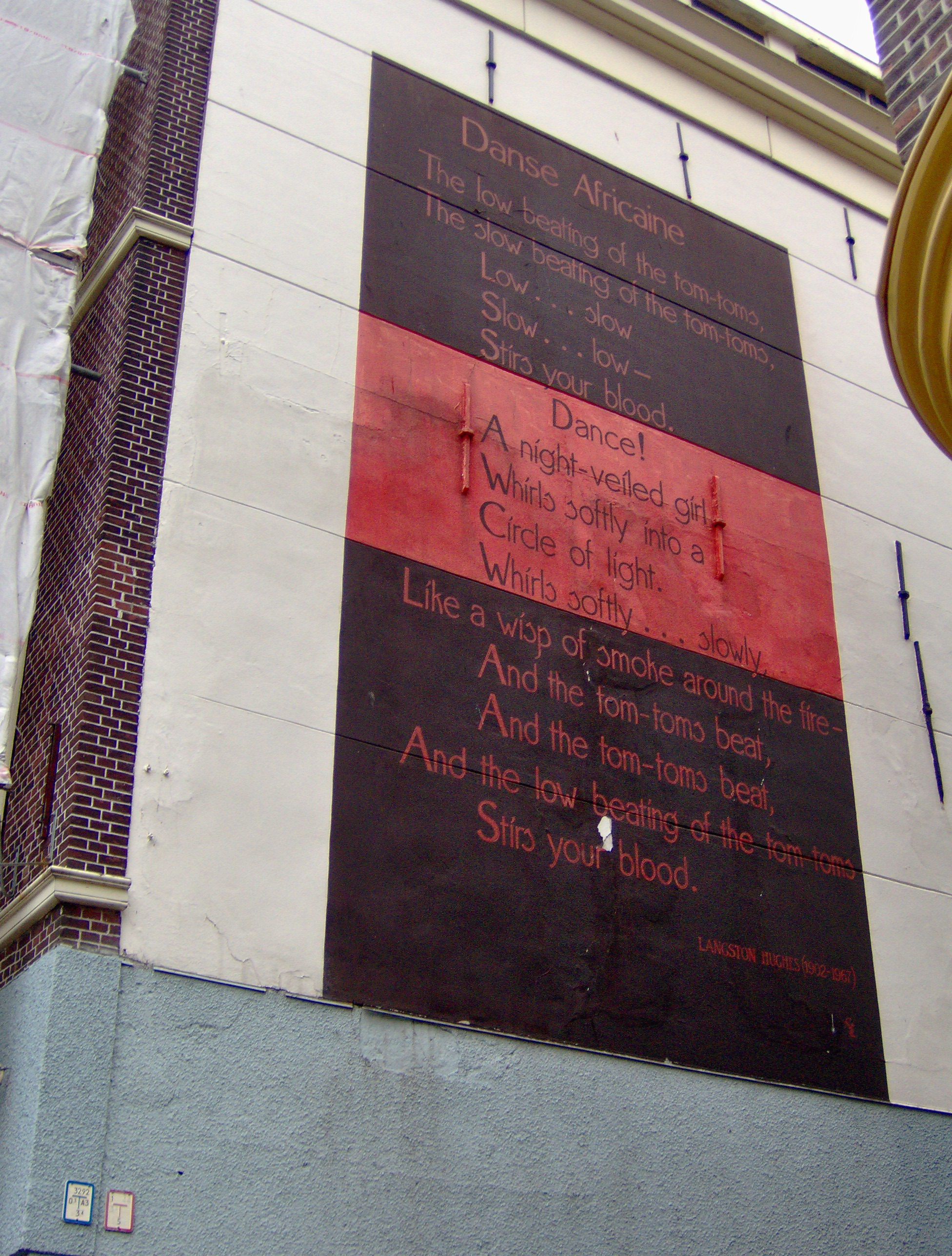
The poem "Danse Africaine" on a wall of the building at the Nieuwe Rijn 46, Leiden, Netherlands

Hughes was featured reciting his poetry on the album Weary Blues (MGM, 1959), with music by Charles Mingus and Leonard Feather, and he also contributed lyrics to Randy Weston's Uhuru Afrika (Roulette, 1960).

Harry Burleigh set the poem "Lovely, dark, and lonely one" from the 1932 collection The Dream Keeper and Other Poems to music in 1935, his last art song. Italian composer Mira Sulpizi set Hughes's text to music in her 1968 song "Lyrics".

Hughes's life has been portrayed in film and stage productions since the late 20th century. In Looking for Langston (1989), British filmmaker Isaac Julien claimed him as a black gay icon—Julien thought that Hughes's sexuality had historically been ignored or downplayed. Film portrayals of Hughes include Gary LeRoi Gray's role as a teenage Hughes in the short subject film Salvation (2003) (based on a portion of his autobiography The Big Sea), and Daniel Sunjata as Hughes in the Brother to Brother (2004). Hughes' Dream Harlem, a documentary by Jamal Joseph, examines Hughes's works and environment.

Paper Armor (1999) by Eisa Davis and Hannibal of the Alps (2005) by Michael Dinwiddie are plays by African-American playwrights that address Hughes's sexuality. Spike Lee's 1996 film Get on the Bus, included a black gay character, played by Isaiah Washington, who invokes the name of Hughes and punches a homophobic character, saying: "This is for James Baldwin and Langston Hughes."

Hughes was also featured prominently in a national campaign sponsored by the Center for Inquiry (CFI) known as African Americans for Humanism.

Hughes's Ask Your Mama: 12 Moods for Jazz, written in 1960, was performed for the first time in March 2009 with specially composed music by Laura Karpman at Carnegie Hall, at the Honor festival curated by Jessye Norman in celebration of the African-American cultural legacy. Ask Your Mama is the centerpiece of "The Langston Hughes Project", a multimedia concert performance directed by Ron McCurdy, professor of music in the Thornton School of Music at the University of Southern California. The European premiere of The Langston Hughes Project, featuring Ice-T and McCurdy, took place at the Barbican Centre, London, on November 21, 2015, as part of the London Jazz Festival mounted by music producers Serious.

The novel Harlem Mosaics (2012) by Whit Frazier depicts the friendship between Langston Hughes and Zora Neale Hurston, and tells the story of how their friendship fell apart during their collaboration on the play Mule Bone.

On September 22, 2016, his poem "I, Too" was printed on a full page of The New York Times in response to the riots of the previous day in Charlotte, North Carolina.

== Literary archives ==
The Beinecke Rare Book & Manuscript Library at Yale University holds the Langston Hughes papers (1862–1980) and the Langston Hughes collection (1924–1969) containing letters, manuscripts, personal items, photographs, clippings, artworks, and objects that document the life of Hughes. The Langston Hughes Memorial Library on the campus of Lincoln University, and at the James Weldon Johnson Collection at Yale also hold archives of Hughes's work. The Moorland–Spingarn Research Center at Howard University includes materials acquired from his travels and contacts through the work of Dorothy B. Porter.

== Honors and awards ==
=== Living ===
- 1926: Hughes won the Witter Bynner Undergraduate Poetry Prize.
- 1935: Hughes was awarded a Guggenheim Fellowship, which allowed him to travel to Spain and Russia.
- 1941: Hughes was awarded a fellowship from the Rosenwald Fund.
- 1943: Lincoln University awarded Hughes an honorary Litt.D.
- 1954: Hughes won the Anisfield-Wolf Book Award.
- 1960: the NAACP awarded Hughes the Spingarn Medal for distinguished achievements by an African American.
- 1961: National Institute of Arts and Letters.
- 1963: Howard University awarded Hughes an honorary doctorate.
- 1964: Western Reserve University awarded Hughes an honorary Litt.D.

=== Memorial ===
Hughes's work continues to have a major readership in contemporary China.

- 1978: the first Langston Hughes Medal was awarded by the City College of New York.
- 1979: Langston Hughes Middle School was created in Reston, Virginia.
- 1981: New York City Landmark status was given to the Harlem home of Langston Hughes at 20 East 127th Street (40°48′26″N 73°56′26″W) by the New York City Landmarks Preservation Commission and 127th Street was renamed "Langston Hughes Place". The Langston Hughes House was listed on the National Register of Historic Places in 1982.
- 2000: Langston Hughes Elementary was opened in Lawrence, Kansas.
- 2002: The United States Postal Service added the image of Langston Hughes to its Black Heritage series of postage stamps.
- 2002: scholar Molefi Kete Asante listed Langston Hughes on his list of 100 Greatest African Americans.
- 2009: Langston Hughes High School was created in Fairburn, Georgia.
- 2012: inducted into the Chicago Literary Hall of Fame.
- 2015: Google Doodle commemorated his 113th birthday.

== Published works ==
=== Poetry collections ===
- The Weary Blues, Knopf, 1926
- Fine Clothes to the Jew, Knopf, 1927
- The Negro Mother and Other Dramatic Recitations, 1931
- Dear Lovely Death, 1931
- The Dream Keeper and Other Poems, Knopf, 1932
- Scottsboro Limited: Four Poems and a Play, Golden Stair Press, N.Y., 1932
- A New Song (1938, incl. the poem "Let America be America Again")
- Madrid 1937 with etchings by Dalla Husband, Gonzalo More, Paris, 1939
- Note on Commercial Theatre, 1940
- Shakespeare in Harlem, Knopf, 1942
- Freedom's Plow, New York: Musette Publishers, 1943
- Jim Crow's Last Stand, Atlanta: Negro Publication Society of America, 1943
- Lament for Dark Peoples and Other Poems, 1944
- Lenin, 1946
- Fields of Wonder, Knopf, 1947
- One-Way Ticket, 1949
- Montage of a Dream Deferred, Holt, 1951
- Selected Poems of Langston Hughes, 1958
- Ask Your Mama: 12 Moods for Jazz, Hill & Wang, 1961
- The Panther and the Lash: Poems of Our Times, 1967
- The Collected Poems of Langston Hughes, Knopf, 1994

=== Novels and short story collections ===
- Not Without Laughter. Knopf, 1930
- The Ways of White Folks, Knopf, 1934
- Simple Speaks His Mind, 1950
- Laughing to Keep from Crying, Holt, 1952
- Simple Takes a Wife, 1953
- The Sweet Flypaper of Life, photographs by Roy DeCarava. 1955
- Simple Stakes a Claim, 1957
- Tambourines to Glory, 1958
- The Best of Simple, 1961
- Simple's Uncle Sam, 1965
- Something in Common and Other Stories, Hill & Wang, 1963
- Short Stories of Langston Hughes, Hill & Wang, 1996

=== Non-fiction books ===
- The Big Sea, New York: Knopf, 1940
- Famous American Negroes, 1954
- Famous Negro Music Makers, New York: Dodd, Mead, 1955
- I Wonder as I Wander, New York: Rinehart & Co., 1956
- A Pictorial History of the Negro in America, with Milton Meltzer. 1956
- Famous Negro Heroes of America, 1958
- Fight for Freedom: The Story of the NAACP. 1962
- Black Magic: A Pictorial History of the Negro in American Entertainment, with Milton Meltzer, 1967

=== Major plays ===
- Mule Bone, with Zora Neale Hurston, 1931
- Mulatto, 1935 (renamed The Barrier, an opera, in 1950)
- Troubled Island, with William Grant Still, 1936
- Little Ham, 1936
- Emperor of Haiti, 1936
- Don't You Want to be Free?, 1938
- Street Scene, contributed lyrics, 1947
- Tambourines to Glory, 1956
- Simply Heavenly, 1957
- Black Nativity, 1961
- Five Plays by Langston Hughes, Bloomington: Indiana University Press, 1963
- Jerico-Jim Crow, 1964

=== Books for children ===
- Popo and Fifina, with Arna Bontemps, 1932
- The First Book of Negroes, 1952
- The First Book of Jazz, 1954
- Marian Anderson: Famous Concert Singer, with Steven C. Tracy, 1954
- The First Book of Rhythms, 1954
- The First Book of the West Indies, 1956
- First Book of Africa, 1964
- Black Misery, illustrated by Arouni, 1969; reprinted 1994, Oxford University Press.

=== As editor ===
- The Poetry of the Negro, 1746–1949: an anthology, edited with Arna Bontemps, Garden City, New York: Doubleday, 1949.
- An African Treasury: Articles, essays, stories, poems by Black Africans, Pyramid, 1960.
- Poems from Black Africa, Indiana University Press, 1963.

== Other writings ==
- The Langston Hughes Reader, New York: Braziller, 1958.
- Good Morning Revolution: Uncollected Social Protest Writings by Langston Hughes, Lawrence Hill, 1973.
- The Collected Works of Langston Hughes, Missouri: University of Missouri Press, 2001.
- The Selected Letters of Langston Hughes, edited by Arnold Rampersad and David Roessel. Knopf, 2014.
- "My Adventures as a Social Poet" (essay), Phylon, 3rd Quarter 1947.
- "The Negro Artist and The Racial Mountain" (article), The Nation, June 23, 1926.

== See also ==
- African-American literature
- Langston Hughes Society
- Pan-Africanism
