= African-American art =

Visual arts of the people of African descent in the United States of America

African-American art is a broad term describing visual art created by African Americans. The range of art they have created, and are continuing to create, over more than two centuries is as varied as the artists themselves. Some have drawn on cultural traditions in Africa, and other parts of the world where the Black diaspora is found, for inspiration. Others have found inspiration in traditional African-American plastic art forms, including basket weaving, pottery, quilting, woodcarving and painting, all of which are sometimes classified as "handicrafts" or "folk art".

Many have also been inspired by European traditions in art, as well as personal experience of life, work and studies there. Like their Western colleagues, many work in Realist, Modernist and Conceptual styles, and all the variations in between, including America's home-grown Abstract expressionist movement, an approach to art seen in the work of Howardena Pindell, McArthur Binion and Norman Lewis, among others.

Like their peers, African-American artists also work in an array of media, including painting, print-making, collage, assemblage, drawing, sculpture and more. Their themes are similarly varied, although many also address, or feel they must address, issues of American Blackness. A part of this media can include physical designs found within the home.

Once known as the "sculptor of horrors", Meta Vaux Warrick Fuller favored a mix of conceptual realism and symbolism, and took inspiration from ghost stories. Mentored by Henry Ossawa Tanner, critiqued by Auguste Rodin, and exhibited in the 1903 Salon, she recognized that a continued career relied on "meet[ing] requests for race-based work from the leading Black scholars, activists, and luminaries who controlled the commission pipeline". By accepting that reality, W. E. B. Du Bois became one of her patrons, and she became the first African-American woman recipient of a federal commission ... for progress-themed dioramas for Jamestown's tercentennial ... and, later, for the fiftieth anniversary celebration of the Emancipation Proclamation", but it all came at some cost.

Another extreme is illustrated by an artist like Emory Douglas, the former minister of culture for the Black Panther Party, whose art was consciously radical, and has since become iconic. "[C]redited with popularising the term 'pigs' for corrupt police officers", his best-known imagery was often harshly critical of the existing power structure, openly violent and, like all political iconography, intended to persuade.

Three sculptors

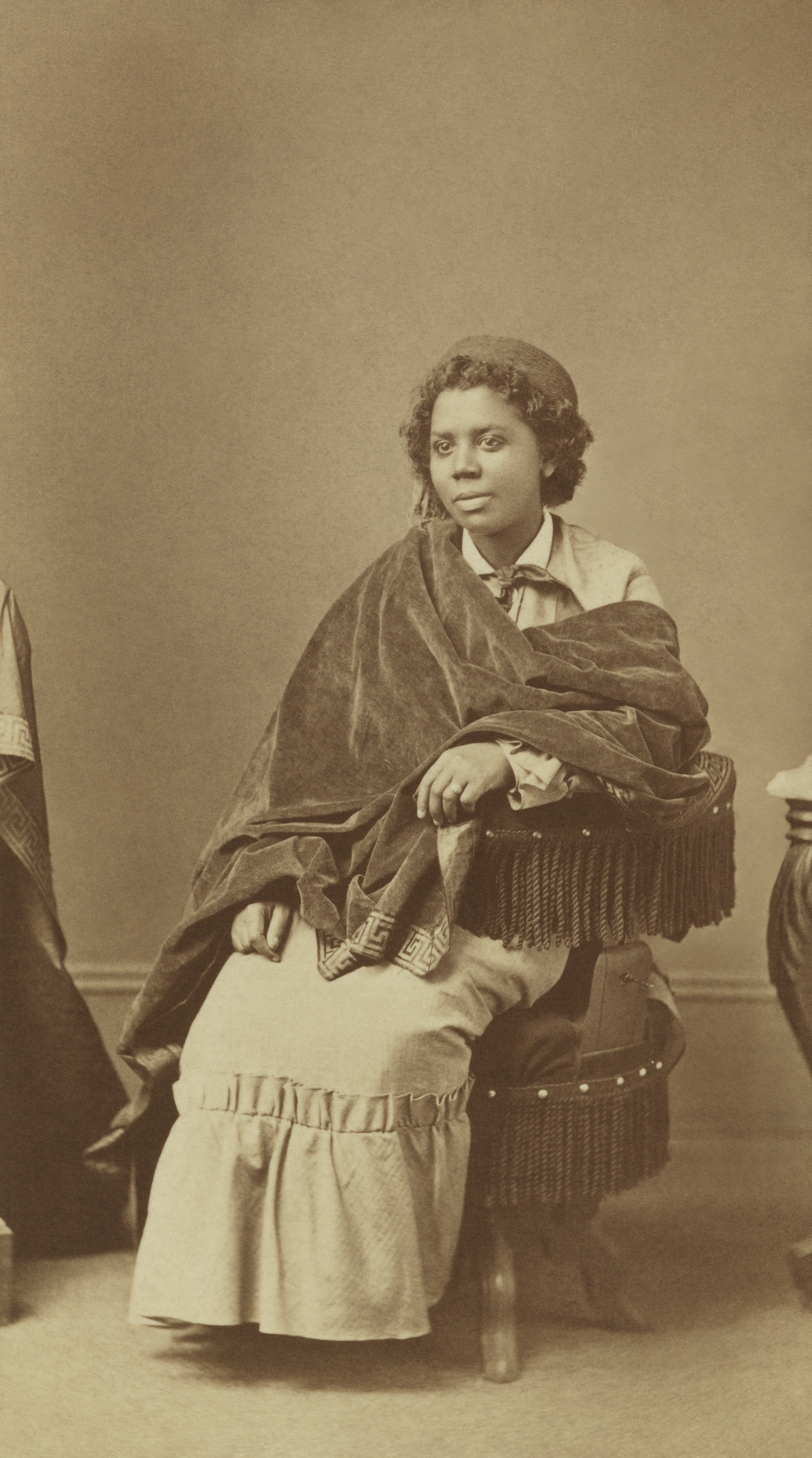
Edmonia Lewis was commissioned to do President Grant's portrait, c. 1870.

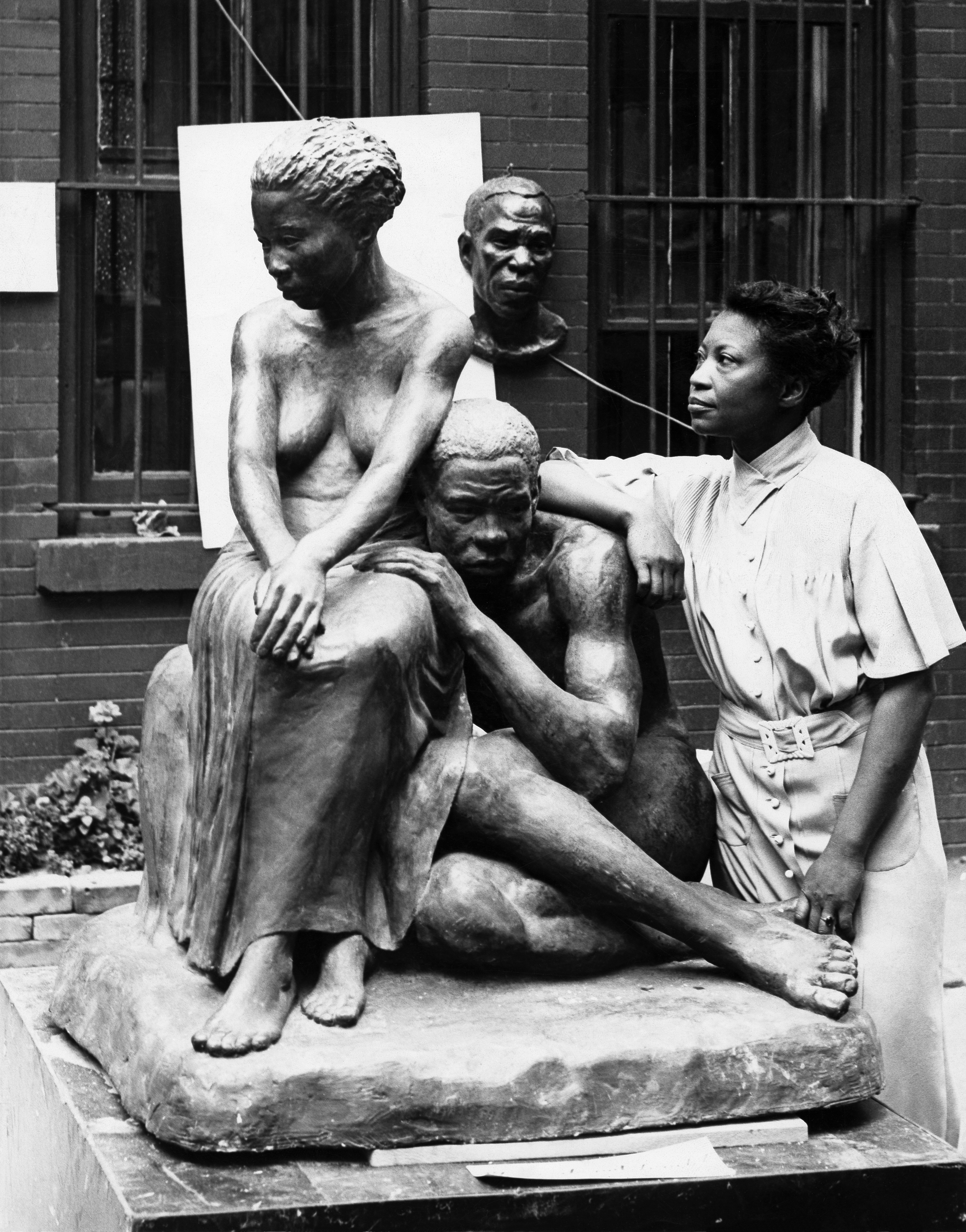
Augusta Savage with Realization, her WPA Federal Art Project, 1938.

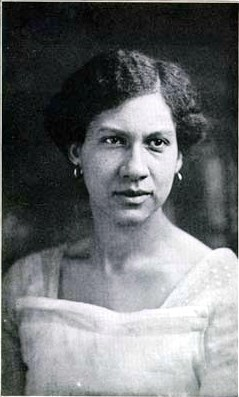
Meta Vaux Warrick Fuller was Rodin's protegee, 1910.

Sculptor Edmonia Lewis, by contrast, financed her first trip to Europe in 1865 by selling sculptures of abolitionist John Brown and Robert Gould Shaw, the Union Colonel who led the enlisted black 54th Massachusetts Infantry Regiment during the Civil War. She would later incorporate issues of race more subtly, using modern themes and ancient symbols in Neoclassical sculpture to suggestive ends. In response to a bust Lewis had made of her, her patron Anna Quincey Waterston wrote admiringly of her: "Tis fitting that a daughter of the race / Whose chains are breaking should receive a gift / So rare as genius."

The grandchild of slaves, print artist and sculptor Elizabeth Catlett was also an activist. Although some of her art includes confrontational symbols from the Black Power movement, she is best known for her portrayals of African-American heroes — Martin Luther King, Malcolm X, Harriet Tubman — and strong maternal women. Sculptor Augusta Savage's work was similarly uplifting. In a large commission for the 1939 New York World's Fair, Lift Every Voice and Sing, which is often described as the Black National Anthem, inspired a called Lift Every Voice and Sing, also known as The Harp as it depicted black singers as the strings of the instrument.

Richard Hunt, is a sculptor born on Chicago's South Side in 1935. A recurrent theme of his work is the integration and expression of African-American history and culture, despite his focus on his own freedom as an artist to work in an abstract mode or one referential or suggestive of his subjects. A descendant of enslaved people brought to this country through the port of Savannah, Georgia, Richard Hunt has singularly made the largest contribution to public art in the U.S.; more than 160 public sculpture commissions grace prominent locations in 24 states and Washington D.C. As a 19-year-old, Richard Hunt taught himself how to weld. Only two years later, he gained national recognition when the Museum of Modern Art acquired his sculpture, Arachne. Another Richard Hunt sculpture, Hero Construction, now stands as the centerpiece of The Art Institute of Chicago. Richard Hunt has held over 150 solo exhibitions and is represented in more than 100 public museums.

Painter Faith Ringgold, who is known for her politicized art, has been described as having a "gorgeous gut punch". Her The American People Series #20: Die which depicts a bloody clash between Cubist black and white figures, was hung opposite Pablo Picasso's Les Demoiselles d'Avignon in the newly renovated MOMA in 2019, the better to start a conversation between the "savage force" of their respective compositions. Conceptual artist Fred Wilson focuses on other kinds of composition, "juxtaposing wildly anomalous items, such as a slave statue and a set of fine china". A 1999 MacArthur "genius grant" recipient, his work encourages "unpacking and upending assumptions about race and history surrounding each".

Narrative artists like Jacob Lawrence use history painting to tell a story in images, as his own Migration Series shows. The 60-panel epic depicts the relocation of a million African Americans to the industrialized North after World War II. As in the cases of Kehinde Wiley and Amy Sherald, history painting can also involve portraiture; in this instance, the official portraits of Barack and Michelle Obama, respectively.

Artists like Horace Pippen and Romare Bearden chose more ordinary subject matter, relying on contemporary life to inspire uncontroversial imagery. The influential Henry Tanner did, too, in paintings like The Banjo Lesson and the Thankful Poor although those paintings — like many of his landscapes and Biblical scenes — often seem illuminated from within. The first African-American to enroll in the prestigious Pennsylvania Academy of the Fine Arts in 1880, Tanner studied with Realist painter Thomas Eakens. He went on to become the first African-American artist to earn international acclaim. He was elected to the National Academy of Design in 1910 and designated an honorary chevalier of the Order of the Legion of Honor in 1923.

Design can be used as a way to "facilitate cultural communication." The United States' complex history with slavery and its aftermath informs how many Black Americans choose to incorporate parts of Black culture into art and design. This is because many parts of Black American culture have been shaped by Western interactions with Africa, which has impacted the lived experiences of Black Americans for generations. This impact has been seen through the creation of art, as many art pieces like woodwork, pottery, and furniture have been used as a symbol of freedom for Black Americans during times of struggle for emancipation.

African-American art is influenced by traditional African culture and Western culture that was forced upon Black slaves. There can be tensions between these African and Western identities for African Americans, especially when African Americans let their heritage inform their design decisions. This is because there is also a complex relationship between the artwork Black designers create and the current Eurocentric standards that still exist within America's art and design fields. Historical assimilation impacts the creative process of including Black culture within design pieces. Sometimes, Black designers change their work to align with these Eurocentric standards to gain more recognition.

== Early African-American art ==
=== Pre-colonial, Antebellum and Civil War eras ===
Early African-American Art

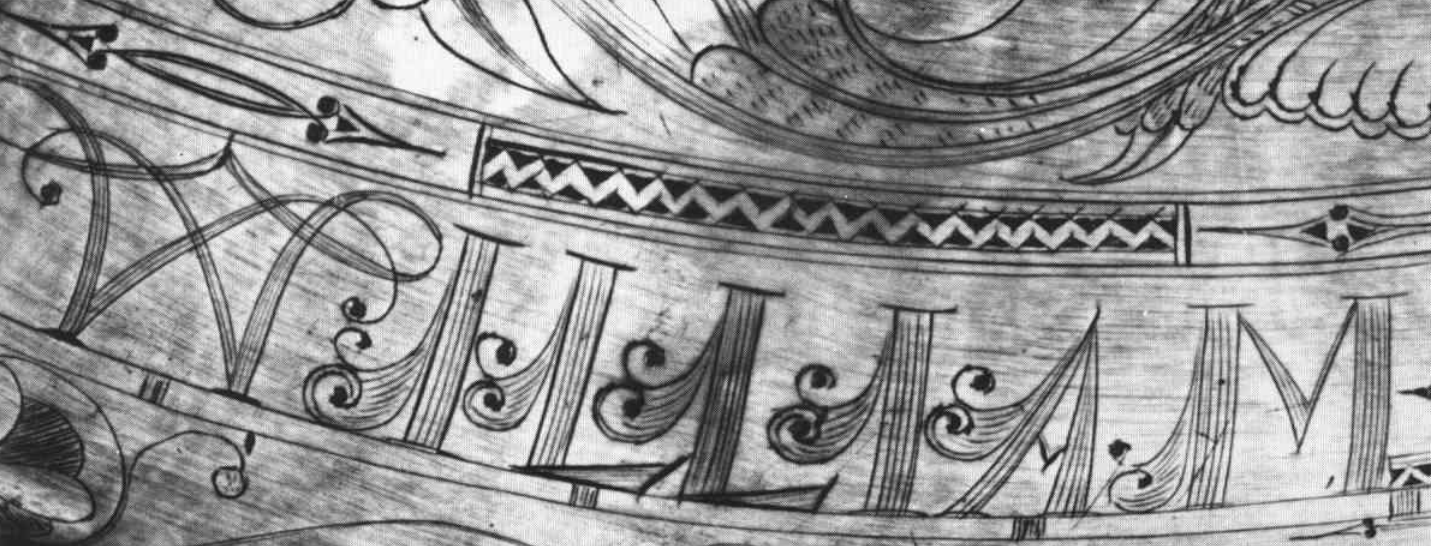
Powder horn carved by John Bush, 1754

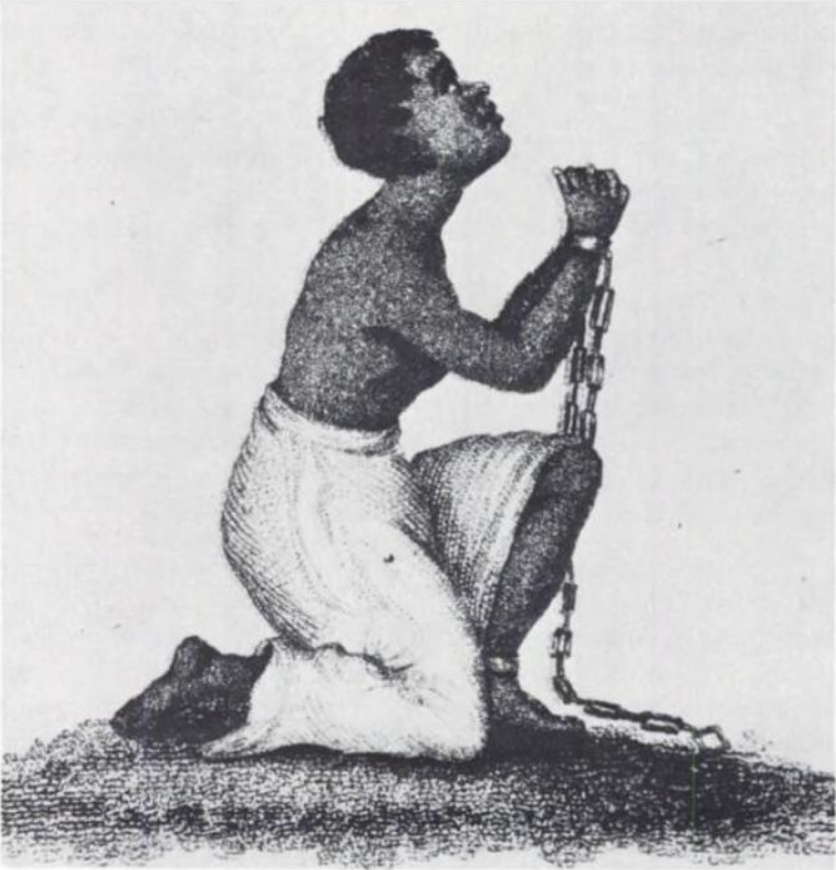
Engraving of a chained female slave by Patrick H. Reason, 1835. Often circulated with the caption "Am I not a woman and a sister?"

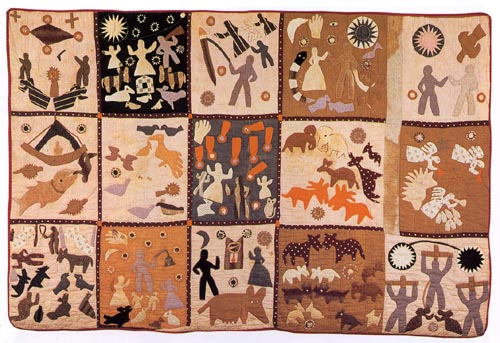
Harriet Powers, Bible quilt, Mixed Media. 1898.

The earliest evidence of African-American art in the United States is the work of skilled craftsmen slaves from New England. Two categories of slave craft items survive from colonial America: articles that were created for personal use by slaves and articles created for public use. Examples from between the 17th century and the early 19th century include: small drums, quilts, wrought-iron figures, baskets, ceramic vessels, woodcuts, and gravestones.

Many of Africa's most skilled slave artisans were hired out by slave owners. With the consent of their masters, some slave artisans were also able to keep a small percentage of the wages earned in their spare time to save enough money to purchase their freedom, and that of their family members.

The public works of art produced by slave craftsmen were an important contribution to the Colonial economy. In New England and the Mid-Atlantic colonies, slaves were apprenticed as goldsmiths, cabinetmakers, engravers, carvers, portrait painters, carpenters, masons and iron workers. The construction and decoration of the Janson House, built on the Hudson River in 1712, was the work of African-Americans. Many of the oldest buildings in Louisiana, South Carolina, and Georgia were built by craftsmen slaves.

Some colonial art may have been by enslaved artists, but because the works are not signed, cannot be positively identified as such. For instance, the Boston printer Thomas Fleet is known to have owned an enslaved woodcut artist named Peter Fleet, who is mentioned by Isaiah Thomas in his history of early American printing, and whose initials appear on a woodcut illustration for the 1743 pamphlet The Prodigal Daughter. It is not possible to identify exactly how many other woodcuts in John Fleet's many publications were cut by James Fleet.

In the mid-18th century, John Bush was a powder horn carver and soldier with the Massachusetts militia fighting with the British in the French and Indian War. Patrick H. Reason, Joshua Johnson, and Scipio Moorhead were among the earliest known portrait artists, from the period of 1773–1887. Patronage by some white families allowed for private tutoring in special cases. Many of these sponsoring whites were abolitionists. The artists received more encouragement and were better able to support themselves in cities, of which there were more in the North and border states.

Harriet Powers (1837–1910) was an African-American folk artist and quilt maker from rural Georgia, born into enslavement. Now nationally recognized for her quilts, she used traditional appliqué techniques to combine local legends, African symbolism, Bible stories, and natural phenomena on her quilts. In her storytelling quilts she critically reflects her complex experience of the post-slavery United States. Only two of her late quilts have survived: Bible Quilt 1886 and Bible Quilt 1898. Her quilts are considered among the finest examples of 19th-century Southern quilting.

Like Powers, the women of Gee's Bend developed a distinctive, bold and sophisticated quilting style based on traditional American (and African-American) quilts, but with a geometric simplicity. Although widely separated by geography, they have qualities reminiscent of Amish quilts and Modern art. The women of Gee's Bend passed their skills and aesthetic down through at least six generations to the present. At one time, scholars believed slaves sometimes used quilt blocks to alert other slaves to escape plans during the time of the Underground Railroad, but most historians do not agree. Quilting remains alive as form of artistic expression in the African-American community.

=== Reconstruction ===
After the Civil War, it became increasingly acceptable for African-American-created works to be exhibited in museums, and painters and sculptors increasingly produced works for this purpose. These were works mostly in the European Romantic and Classical traditions of landscapes and portraits. Edward Mitchell Bannister, Henry Ossawa Tanner and Edmonia Lewis are the most notable from this period. Others include Meta Vaux Warrick Fuller, a female artist who, like Edmonia Lewis, was a sculptor, as well as Grafton Tyler Brown and Nelson A. Primus.

The goal of widespread recognition across racial boundaries was first eased within America's big cities, including Philadelphia, Boston, Chicago, New York, and New Orleans. Even in these places, however, there were discriminatory limitations. Abroad, however, African Americans were much better received. In Europe — especially Paris, France — these artists were freer to experiment with techniques outside traditional western art. Freedom of expression was much more prevalent in Paris and, to a lesser extent, Munich and Rome.

== Contemporary art ==
Archibald Motley

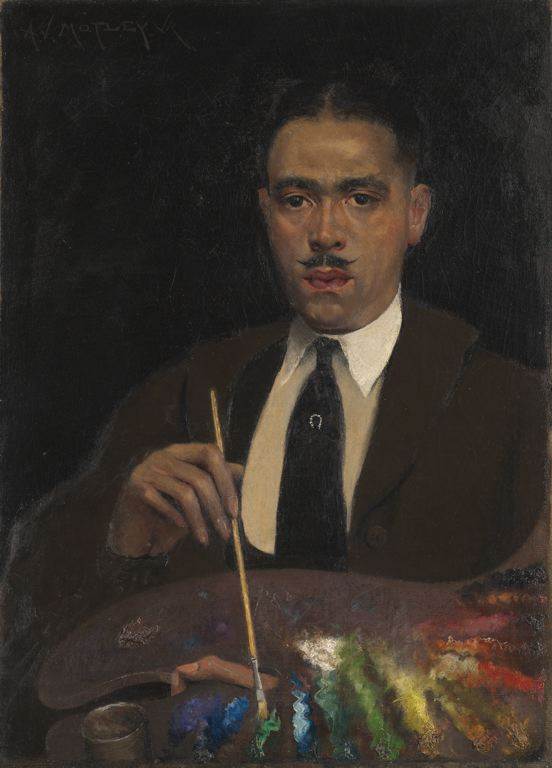
Self portrait, 1920

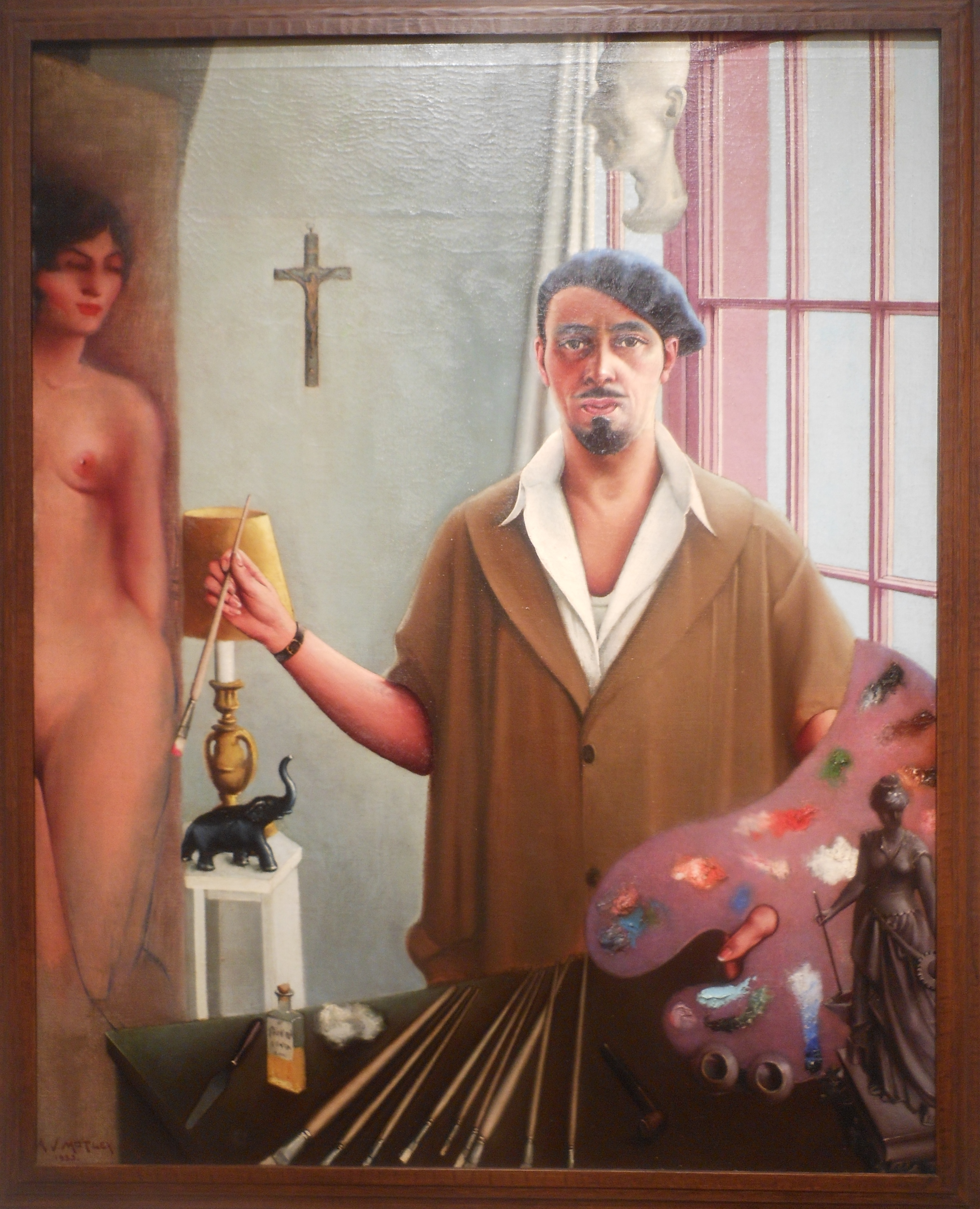
Self portrait, 1933

Jacob Lawrence

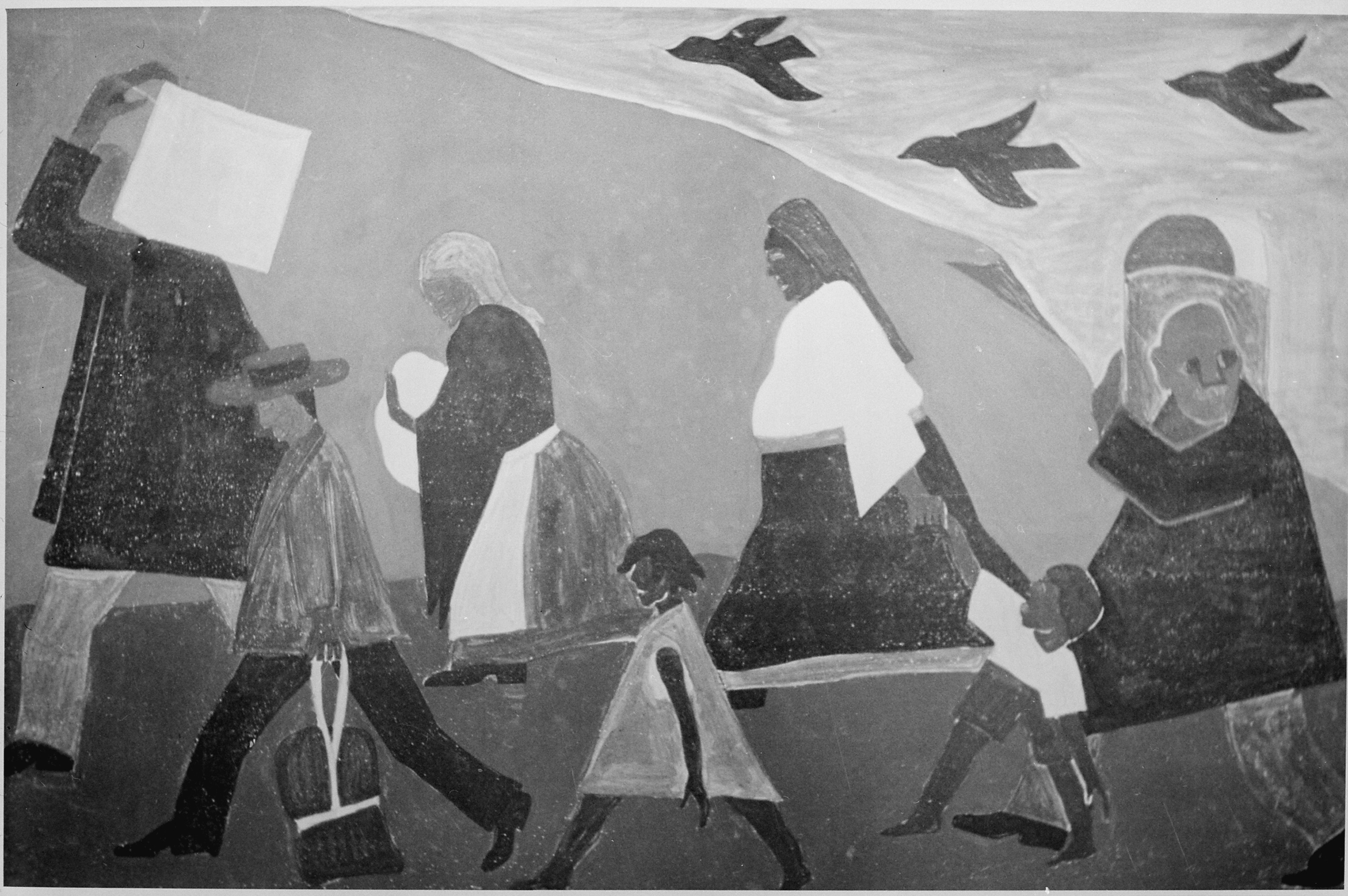
Jacob Lawrence gained recognition at age 23 for his 60-panel Migration Series, depicting the Great Migration of African Americans from the rural South to the urban North. The name of this panel is Douglass Argued Against Poor Negroes Leaving the South

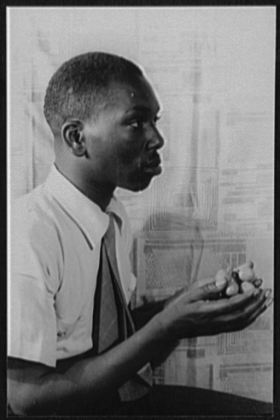
Portrait of Jacob Lawrence, 1941.

=== The Harlem Renaissance ===
The Harlem Renaissance refers to an enormous flourishing in African-American art of all kinds, including visual art. Ideas that were already widespread in other parts of the world at the time had begun to spread into U.S. artistic communities during the 1920s. Notable artists in this period included Richmond Barthé, Aaron Douglas, Lawrence Harris, Palmer Hayden, William H. Johnson, Sargent Johnson, John T. Biggers, Earle Wilton Richardson, Malvin Gray Johnson, Archibald Motley, Augusta Savage, Hale Woodruff and photographer James Van Der Zee.

William E. Harmon, an art patron and aficionado, established the Harmon Foundation in 1922, and it served as a large-scale patron of African-American art until 1967, generating interest in, and recognition for, artists who might have otherwise remained unknown. The Harmon Award and the annual "Exhibition of the Work of Negro Artists" further contributed to the support, as did the William E. Harmon Foundation Award for Distinguished Achievement Among Negroes, which although not limited to visual artists was awarded to several of them, including Hale Woodruff, Palmer Hayden and Archibald Motley. In 1929, the funding temporarily ended as a result of the Great Depression, only to resume mounting exhibitions and offering funding once the economy revived artists like Jacob Lawrence, Laura Wheeler Waring and others.

By 1933, the U.S. Treasury Department's Public Works of Art Project was attempting to provide support for artists in 1933, but their efforts proved ineffective. President Franklin D. Roosevelt created the Works Progress Administration (WPA) in 1935, and that program succeeded at providing all American artists, and especially African-American artists, with a means to earn a living in a devastated economy. By the middle of the 1930s, more than 250,000 African Americans were involved with the WPA, including Jacob Lawrence, Gwendolyn Knight, sculptor William Artis; painter and children's book illustrator Ernest Crichlow, cartoonist and illustrator Elton C. Fax, photographer Marvin Smith, Dox Thrash, who invented the printmaking method carborundum Mezzotint, painters Georgette Seabrooke and Elba Lightfoot, best known for their Harlem Hospital murals; Chicago printmaker Eldzier Cortor; and renowned Illinois-based artist Adrian Troy and many others. Many of these artists found themselves drawn to the interwar movement known as Social Realism, which reflected the politics and socioeconomic views of a generation that had been drafted into WWI, only to dance through the Roaring 1920s and crash in the Great Depression.

Important cities with significant black populations and important African-American art circles included Philadelphia, Boston, San Francisco and Washington, D.C. The WPA led to a new wave of important black art professors. Mixed media, abstract art, cubism, and social realism became not only acceptable, but desirable. Artists of the WPA united to form the 1935 Harlem Artists Guild, which developed community art facilities in major cities. Leading forms of art included drawing, sculpture, printmaking, painting, pottery, quilting, weaving and photography. In 1939, however, the costly WPA and its projects all were terminated. In 1943, James A. Porter, a professor in the Department of Art at Howard University, wrote the first major text on African-American art and artists, Modern Negro Art.

=== Mid-century ===
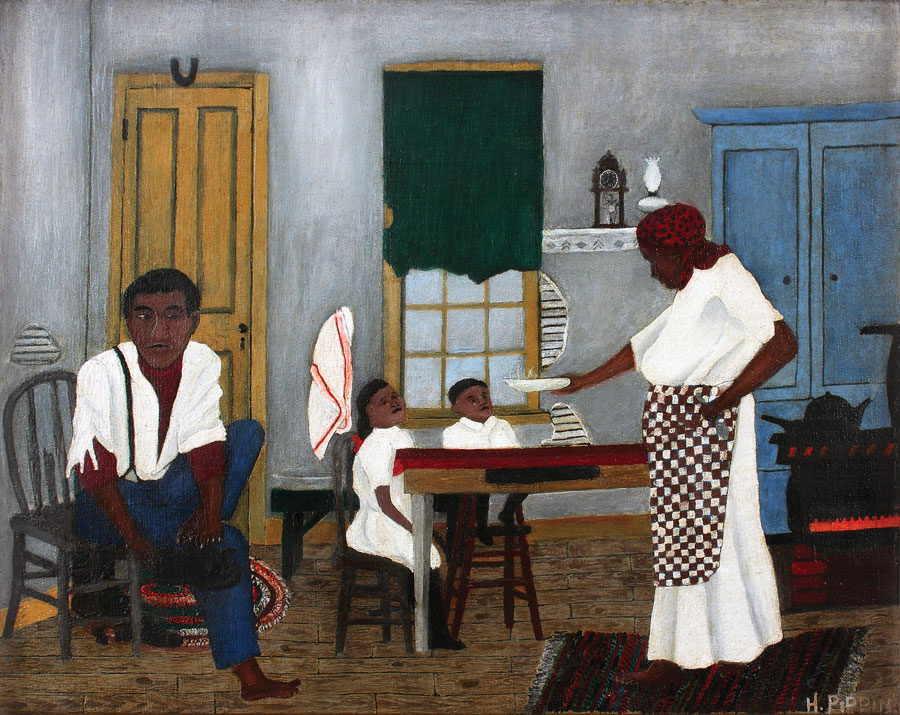
Sunday Morning Breakfast by Horace Pippin, 1943.

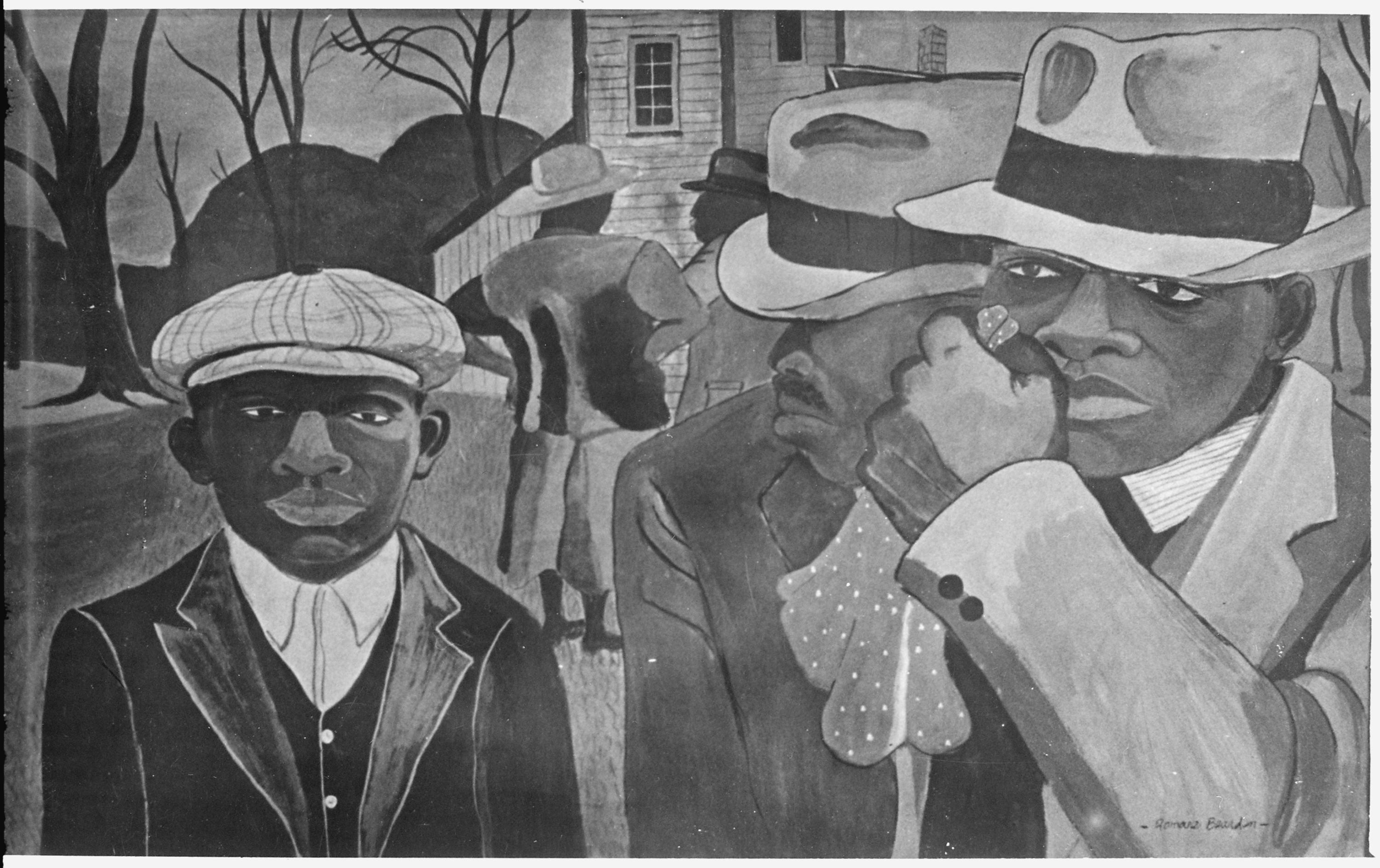
Romare Bearden, After Church, n.d.

In the 1950s and 1960s, few African-American artists were widely known or accepted. Despite this, the Highwaymen, a loose association of 26 African-American artists from Fort Pierce, Florida, created idyllic, quickly realized images of the Florida landscape and peddled some 200,000 of them from the trunks of their cars. In the 1950s and 1960s, it was impossible to find galleries interested in selling artworks by a group of unknown, self-taught African Americans, so they sold their art directly to the public rather than through galleries and art agents. Rediscovered in the mid-1990s, they are recognized today as an important part of American folk history, and the current market price for an original Highwaymen painting can easily bring in thousands of dollars. In 2004, the original group of 26 were inducted into the Florida Artists Hall of Fame. Currently eight of the 26 are deceased, including A. Hair, H. Newton, Ellis and George Buckner, A. Moran, L. Roberts, Hezekiah Baker and, most recently, Johnny Daniels. The full list of 26 can be found in the Florida Artists Hall of Fame, as well as various highwaymen and Florida art websites.

After the Second World War, some artists took a global approach, working and exhibiting abroad, in Paris, and as the decade wore on, relocated gradually in other welcoming cities such as Copenhagen, Amsterdam, and Stockholm: Barbara Chase-Riboud, Edward Clark, Harvey Cropper, Beauford Delaney, Herbert Gentry, Bill Hutson, Clifford Jackson, Sam Middleton, Larry Potter, Haywood Bill Rivers, Merton Simpson, and Walter Williams.

Some African-American artists did make it into important New York galleries by the 1950s and 1960s: Horace Pippin, Romare Bearden, Jacob Lawrence, Richard Hunt, William T. Williams, Norman Lewis, Thomas Sills, and Sam Gilliam were among the few who had successfully been received in a gallery setting. Richard Hunt was the first African American visual artist to serve on the National Council on the Arts, appointed by President Lyndon B. Johnson in 1968. Hunt was the fourth African American on the council, after Marian Anderson, Ralph Ellison, and Duke Ellington. In 1971, Richard Hunt was the first African American sculptor to have a major solo retrospective at the Museum of Modern Art.

The Civil Rights Movement of the 1960s and 1970s led artists to capture and express the changing times. Galleries and community art centers developed for the purpose of displaying African-American art, and collegiate teaching positions were created by and for African-American artists. Some African-American women were also active in the feminist art movement in the 1970s. Faith Ringgold made work that featured black female subjects and that addressed the conjunction of racism and sexism in the U.S., while the collective Where We At (WWA) held exhibitions exclusively featuring the artwork of African-American women.

By the 1980s and 1990s, hip-hop graffiti began to predominate in urban communities. Most major cities had developed museums devoted to African-American artists. The National Endowment for the Arts provided increasing support for these artists.

=== Late 20th/early 21st century ===
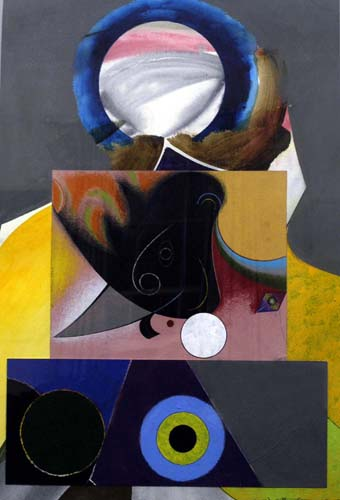
Midnight Golfer by Eugene J. Martin, mixed media collage on rag paper, 1990.

Kara Walker, a contemporary American artist, is known for her exploration of race, gender, sexuality, violence and identity in her artworks. Walker's silhouette images work to bridge unfinished folklore in the Antebellum South and are reminiscent of the earlier work of Harriet Powers. Her nightmarish yet fantastical images incorporate a cinematic feel. In 2007, Walker was listed among Time magazine's "100 Most Influential People in The World, Artists and Entertainers". Textile artists are part of African-American art history. According to the 2010 Quilting in America industry survey, there are 1.6 million quilters in the United States. One historic non profit organization with several members who are quilters and fiber artists is Women of Visions, Inc. located in Pittsburgh, Pennsylvania at the Pittsburgh Center for the Arts. WOV Inc artists past and present work in a variety of mediums. Those who have shown internationally include Renee Stout and Tina Williams Brewer.

Influential contemporary artists include Larry D. Alexander, Laylah Ali, Amalia Amaki, Emma Amos, Jean-Michel Basquiat, Dawoud Bey, Camille Billops, Mark Bradford, Edward Clark, Willie Cole, Robert Colescott, Louis Delsarte, David Driskell, Leonardo Drew, Melvin Edwards, Ricardo Francis, Charles Gaines, Ellen Gallagher, Herbert Gentry, Sam Gilliam, David Hammons, Jerry Harris, Joseph Holston, Richard Hunt, Martha Jackson-Jarvis, Katie S. Mallory, M. Scott Johnson, Rashid Johnson, Joe Lewis, Glenn Ligon, James Little, Edward L. Loper Sr., Alvin D. Loving, Kerry James Marshall, Eugene J. Martin, Richard Mayhew, Sam Middleton, Howard McCalebb, Charles McGill, Thaddeus Mosley, Sana Musasama, Senga Nengudi, Joe Overstreet, Martin Puryear, Adrian Piper, Howardena Pindell, Faith Ringgold, Gale Fulton Ross, Alison Saar, Betye Saar, John Solomon Sandridge, Raymond Saunders, John T. Scott, Joyce Scott, Gary Simmons, Lorna Simpson, Renee Stout, Kara Walker, Carrie Mae Weems, Stanley Whitney, William T. Williams, Jack Whitten, Fred Wilson, Richard Wyatt Jr., Richard Yarde, and Purvis Young, Kehinde Wiley, Mickalene Thomas, Barkley Hendricks, Jeff Sonhouse, William Walker, Ellsworth Ausby, Che Baraka, Emmett Wigglesworth, Otto Neals, Dindga McCannon, Terry Dixon (artist), Frederick J. Brown, Gee Horton and many others.

== Galleries ==
=== Art ===
==== Early African-American ====
(Selection was limited by availability.)

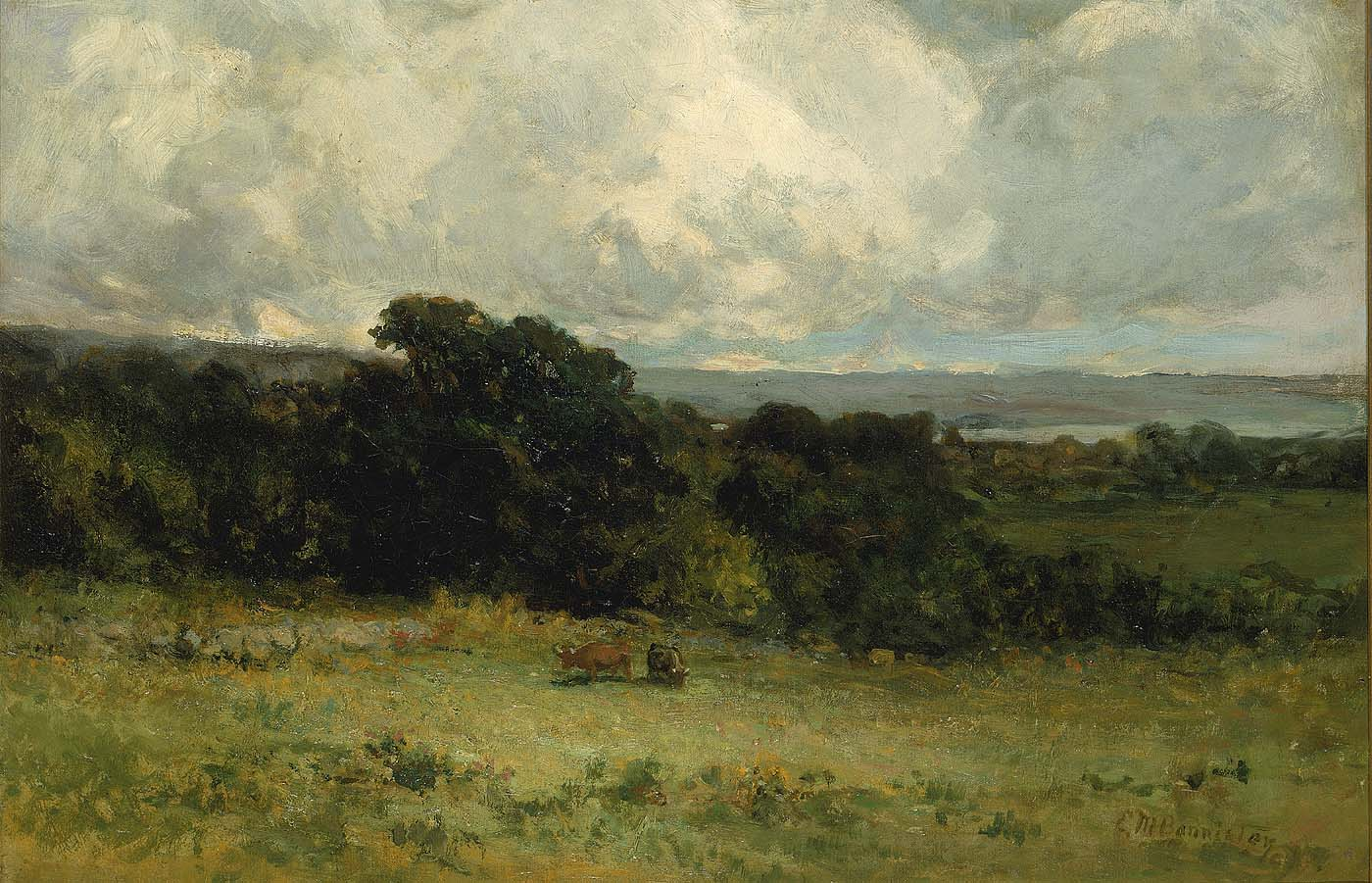
Painter Edward Mitchell Bannister, Pleasant Pastures, 1887.

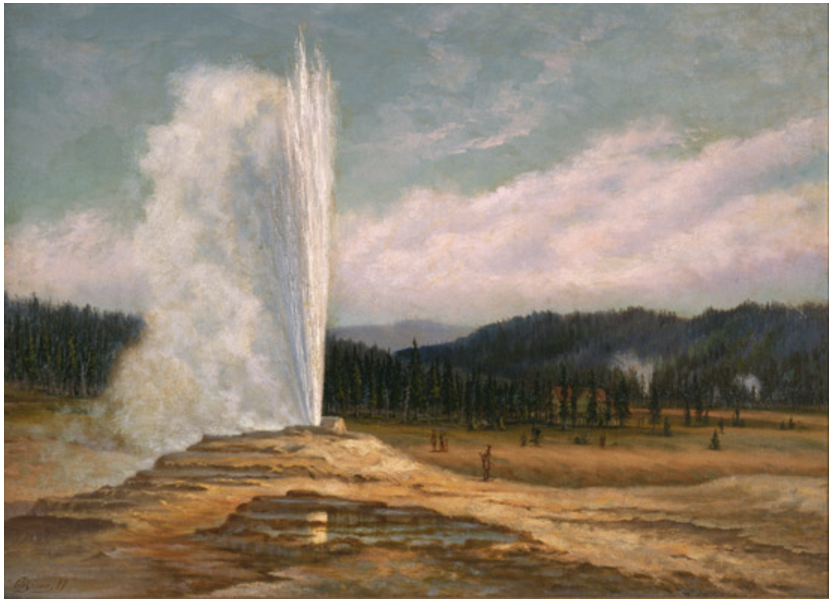
Painter Grafton Tyler Brown, Old Faithful Geyser, Yellowstone National Park, 1887.

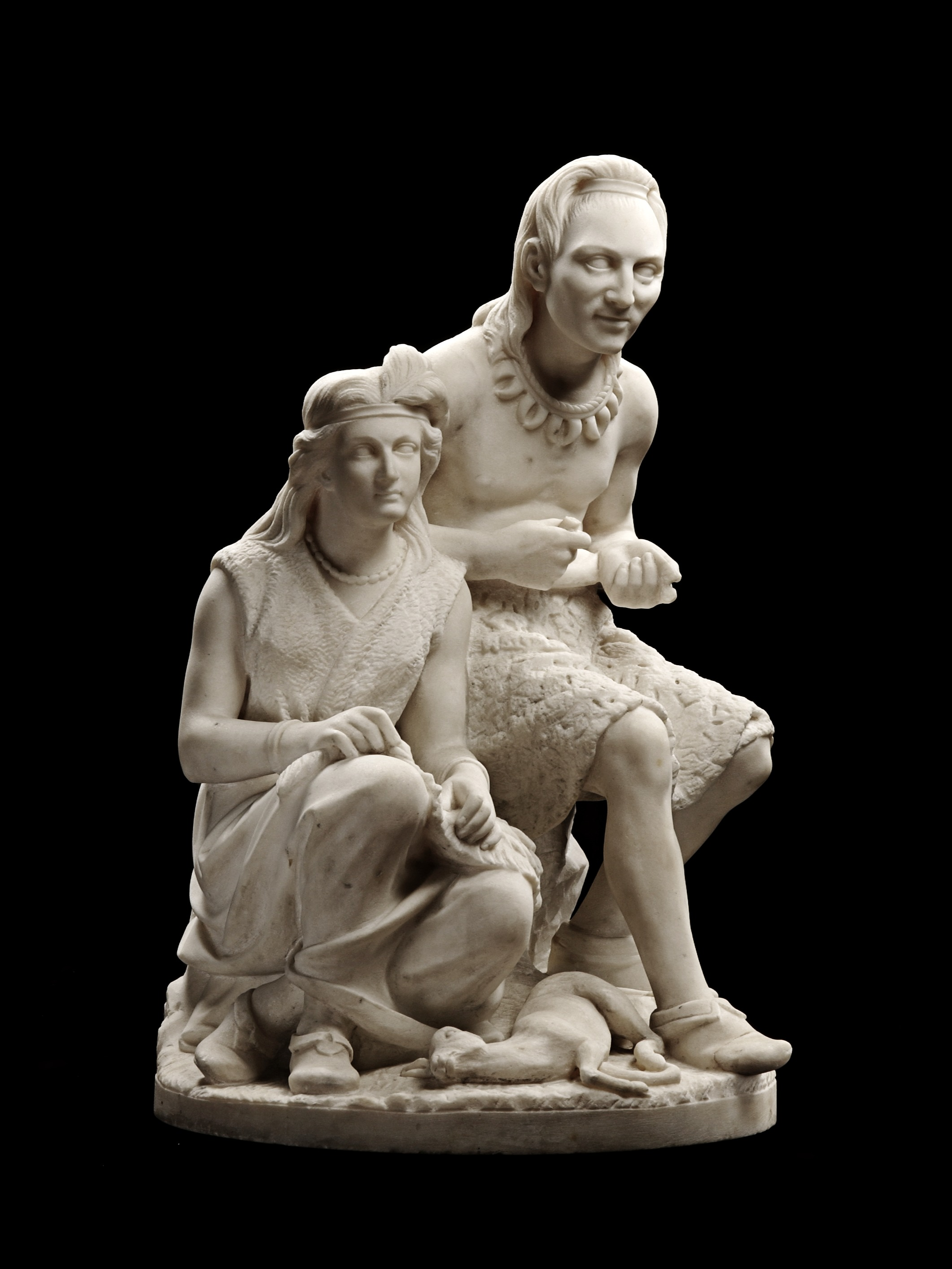
Sculptor Edmonia Lewis, Old Arrow Maker, 1872.

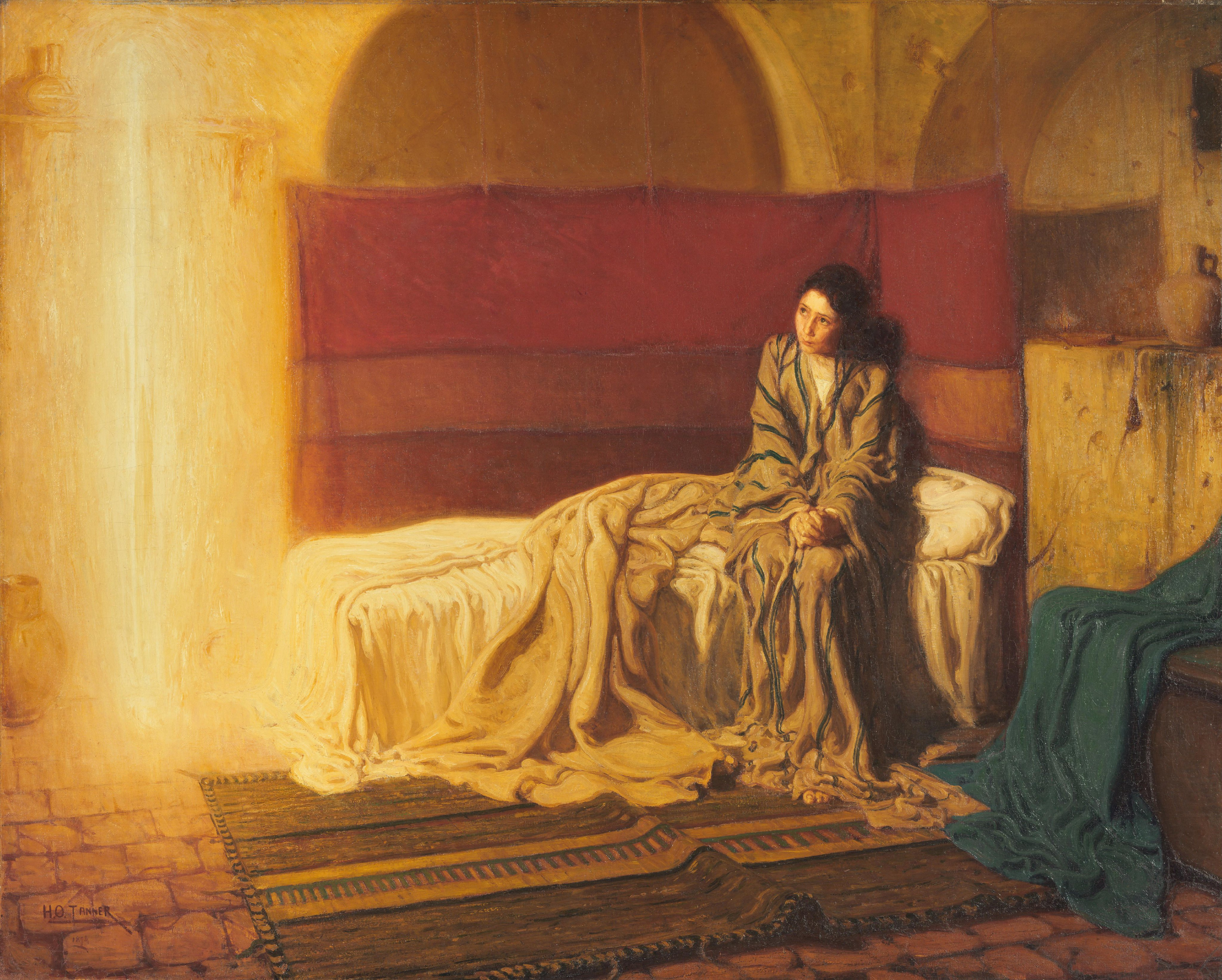
Painter Henry Ossawa Tanner, The Annunciation, 1898.

==== Harlem Renaissance ====
(Selection was limited by availability.)

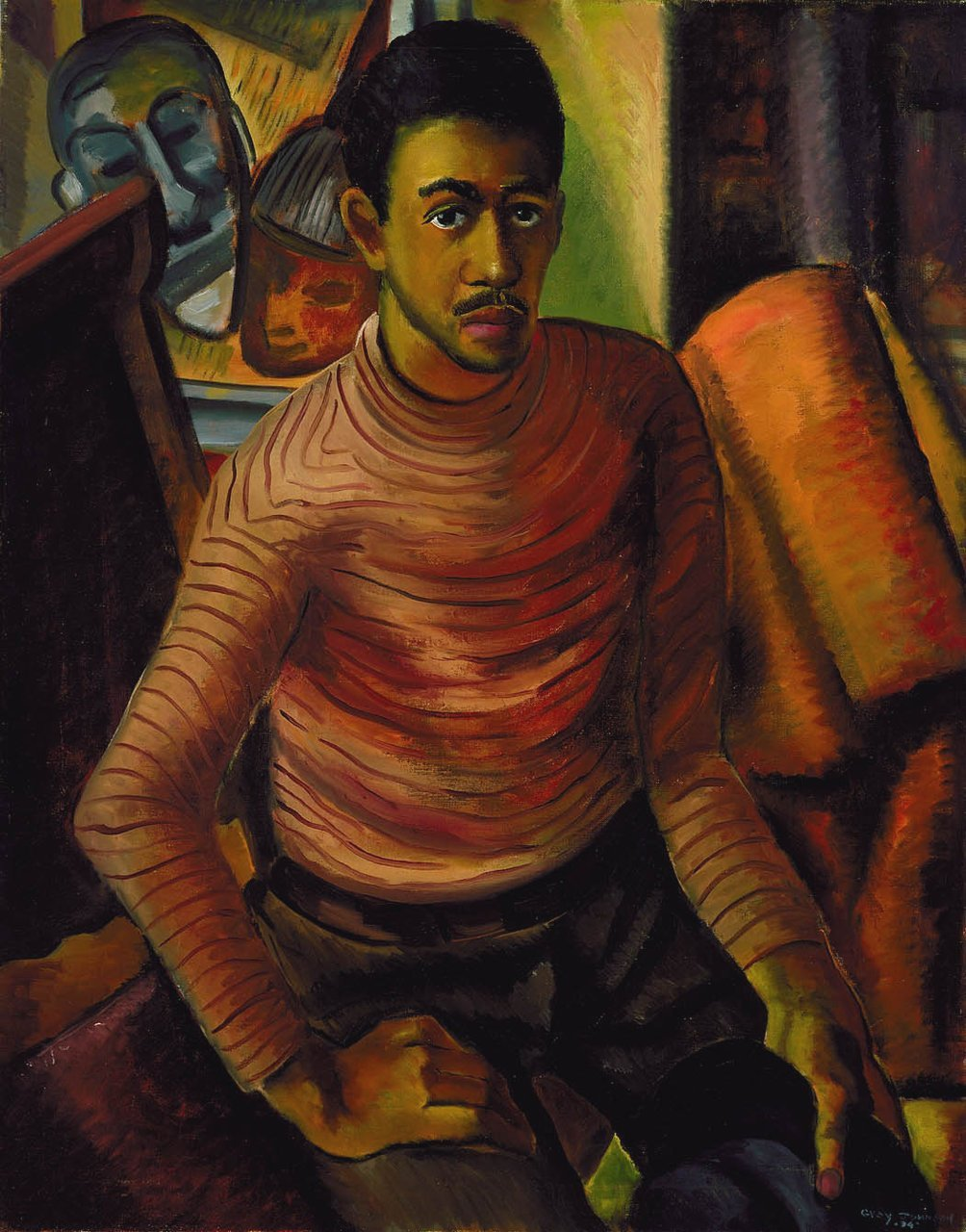
Self-portrait by painter Malvin Gray Johnson, 1934.

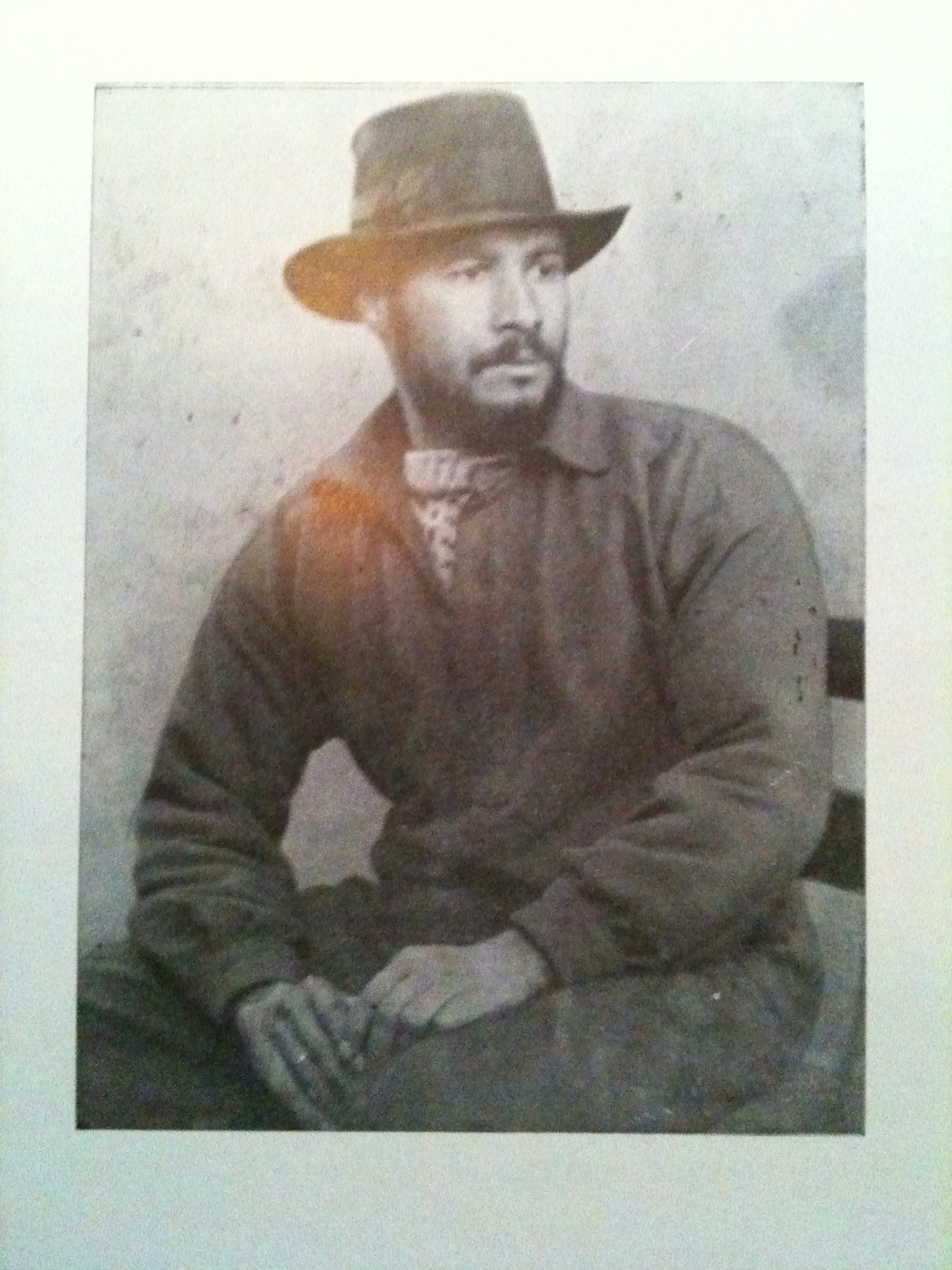
Photo by the painter William H. Johnson, 1931.

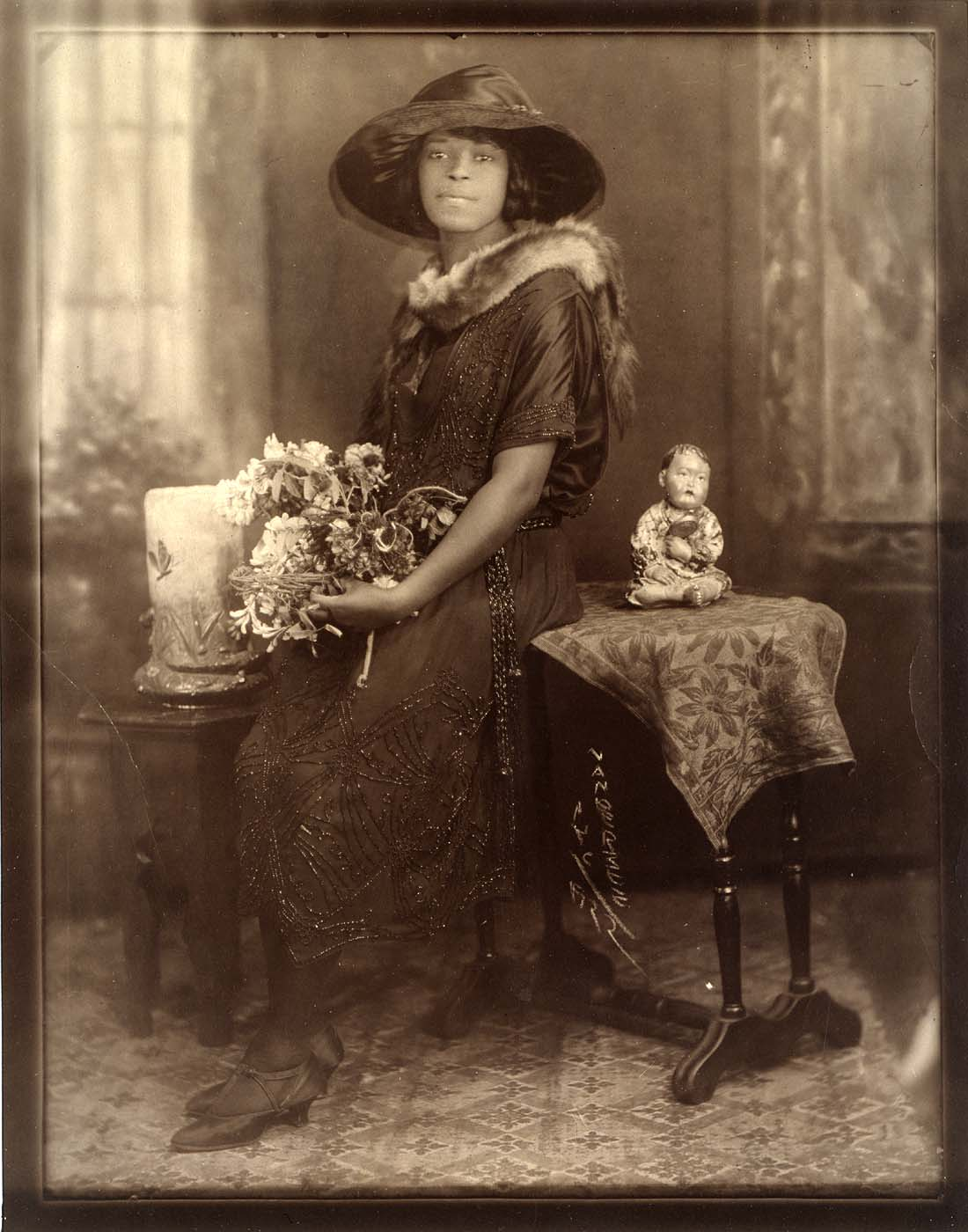
Photographer James Van Der Zee's photo of a woman in evening attire, 1922.

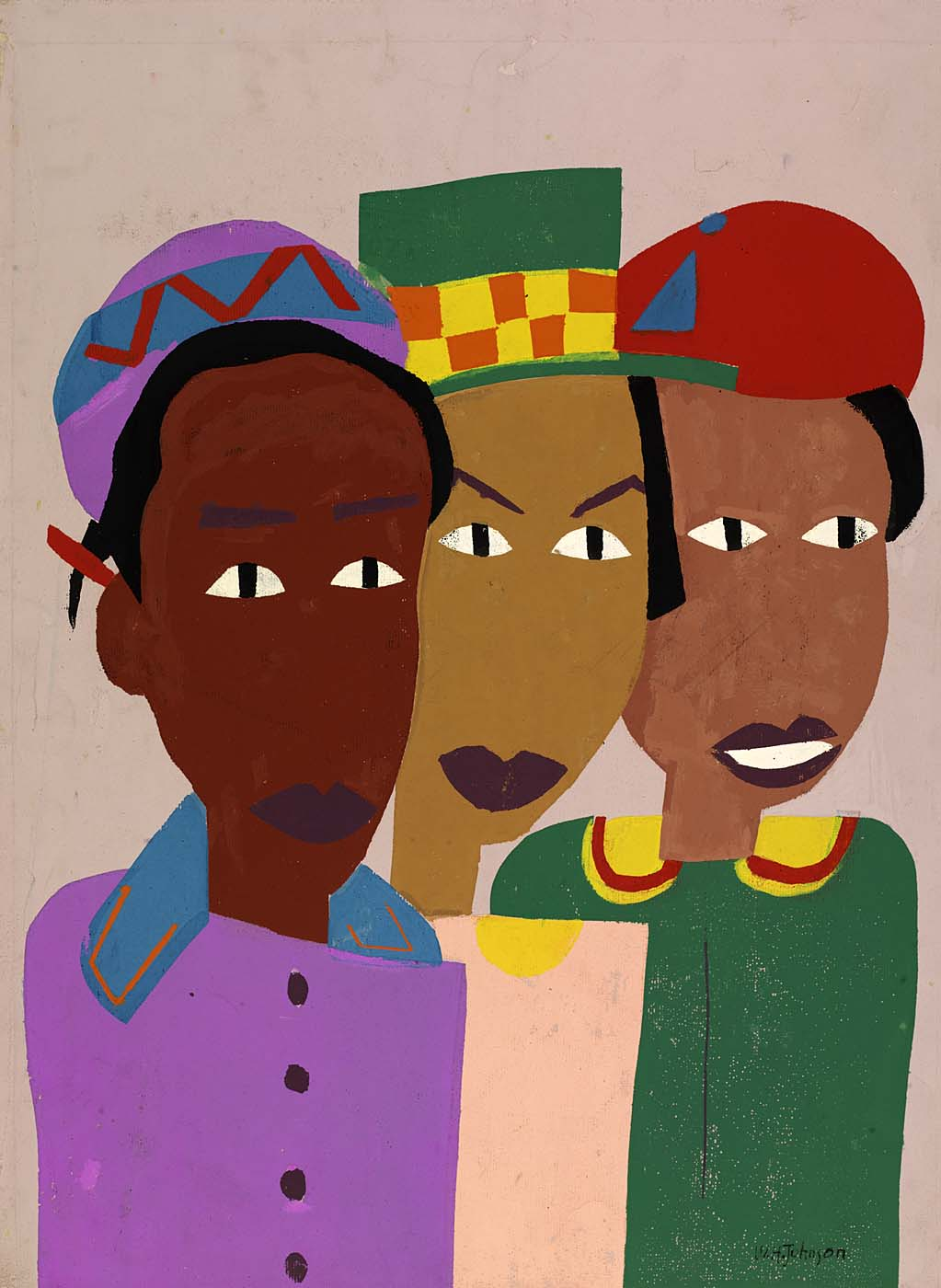
William H. Johnson's Three Friends, c. 1945.

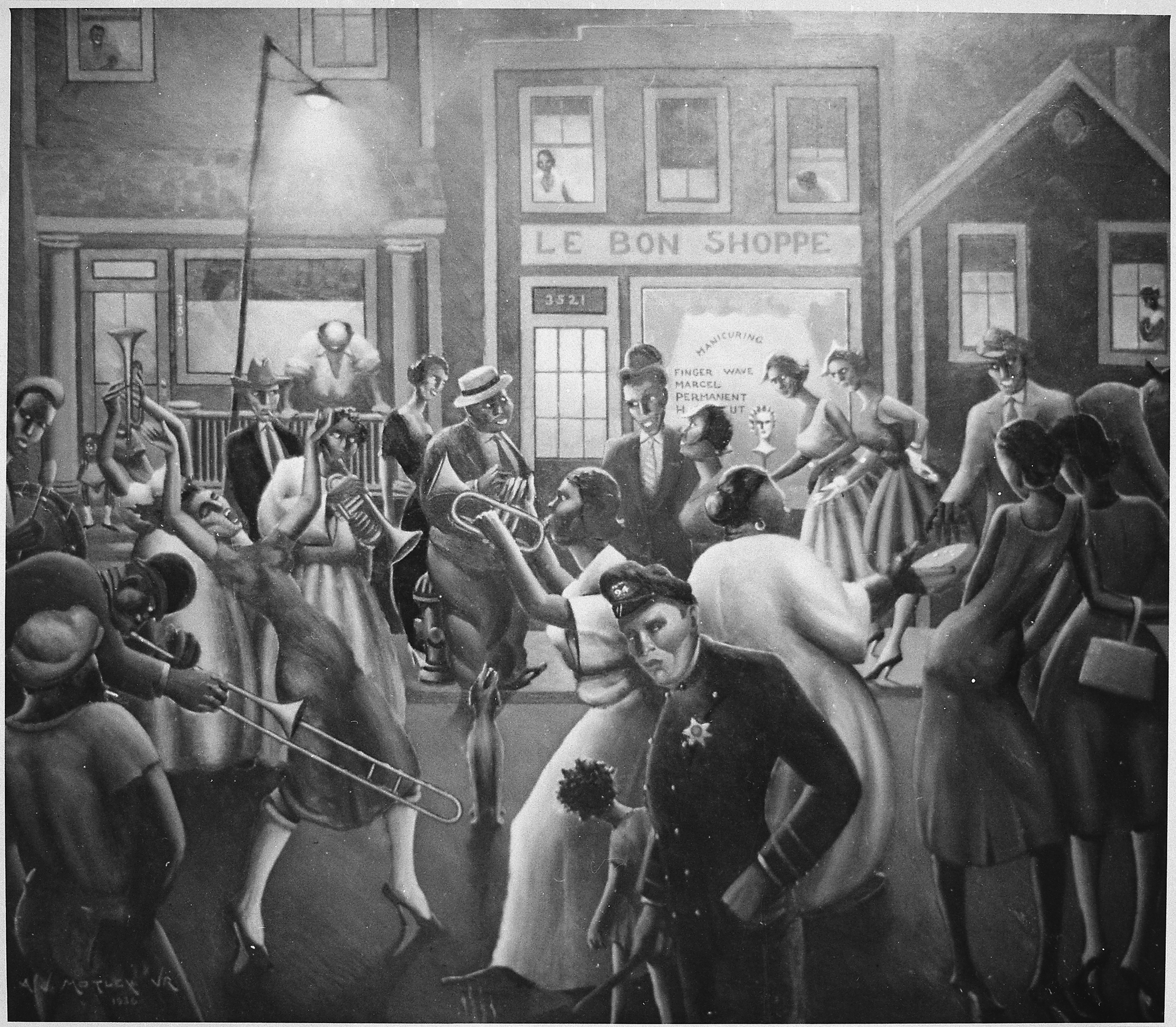
Archibald Motley, Gettin' Religion, 1948.

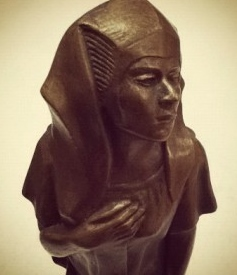
Meta Vaux Warrick Fuller's Ethiopia Awakening, 1921.

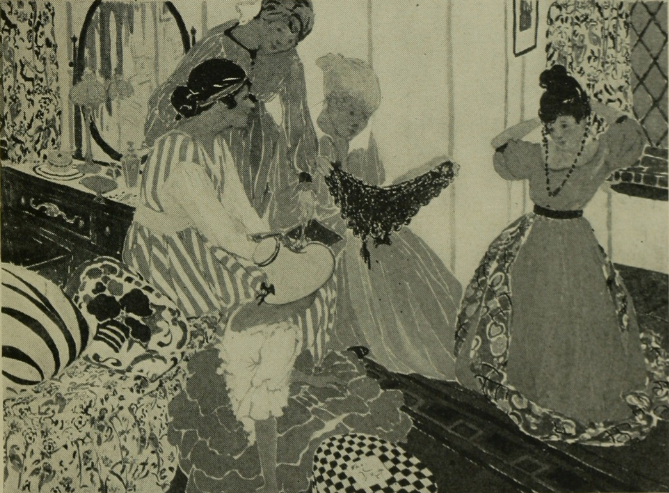
Laura Wheeler's Heirlooms, 1916.

==== Contemporary ====
(Selection was limited by availability.)

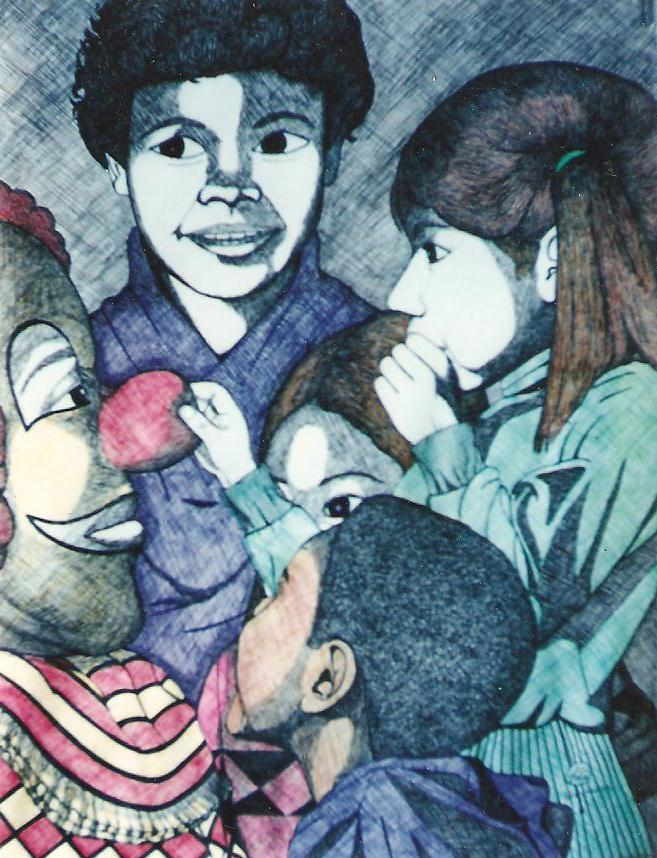
Larry D. Alexander, Send in the Clown, 2007.

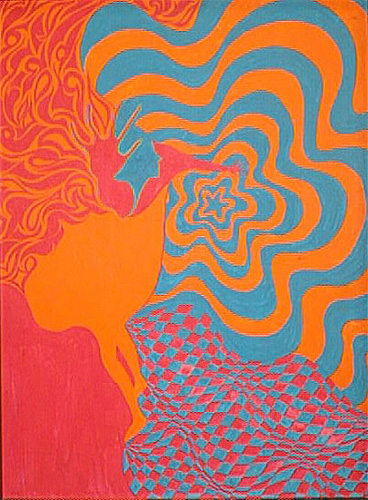
Adrian Piper's Alice Down the Rabbit Hole, 1965.

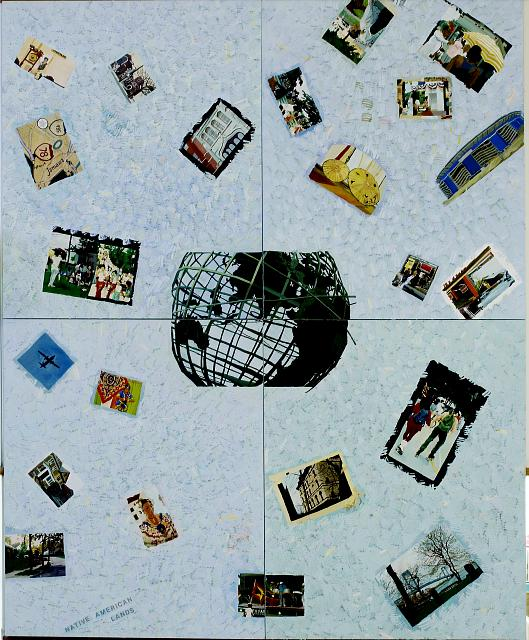
Howardeena Pindell's Queens, Festival, 2007.

=== Artists ===
==== Harlem Renaissance ====
(Selection was limited by availability.)

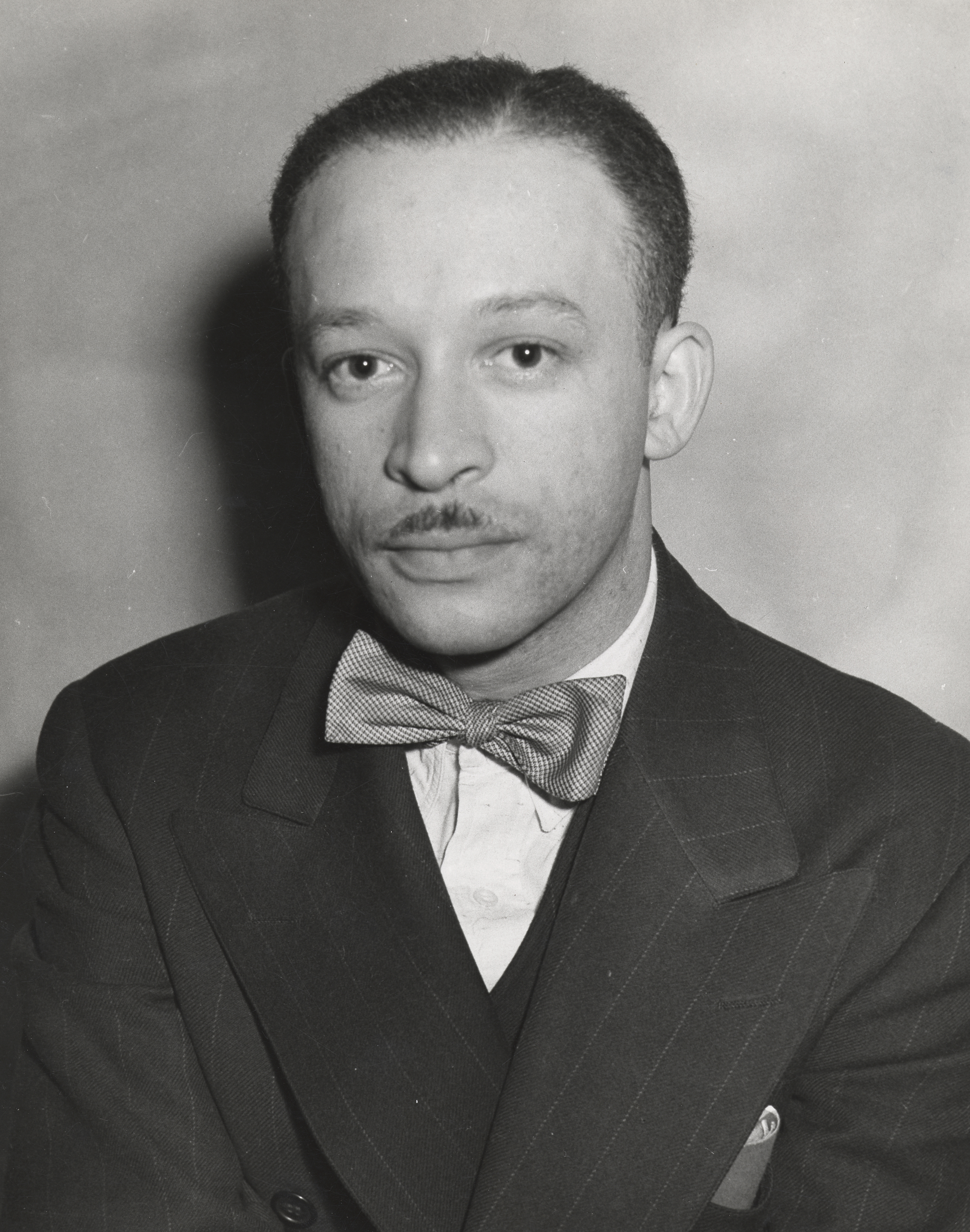
Painter, sculptor, illustrator and muralist Charles Alston in 1939.

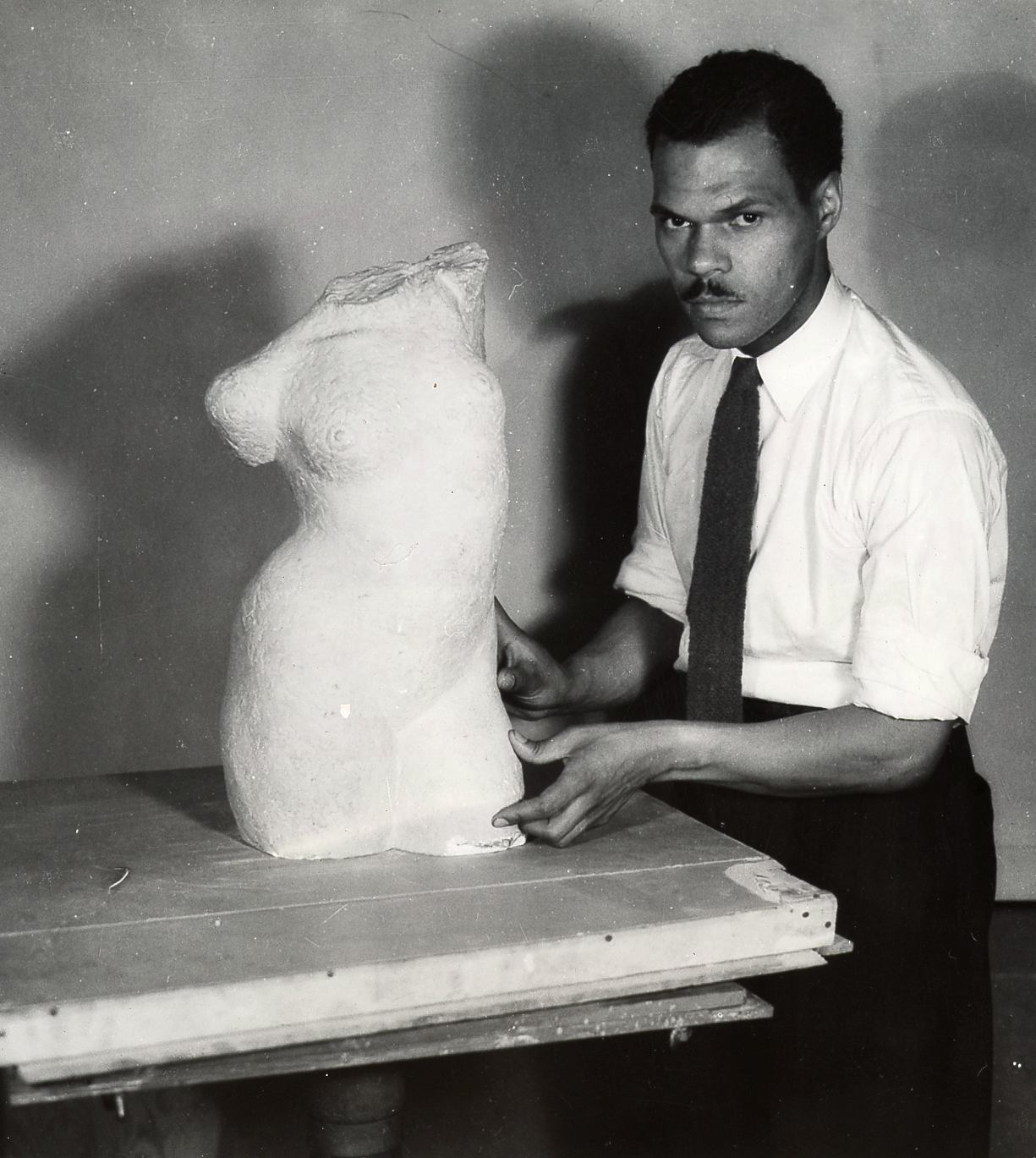
Sculptor and character artist Henry W. Bannarn in 1937.

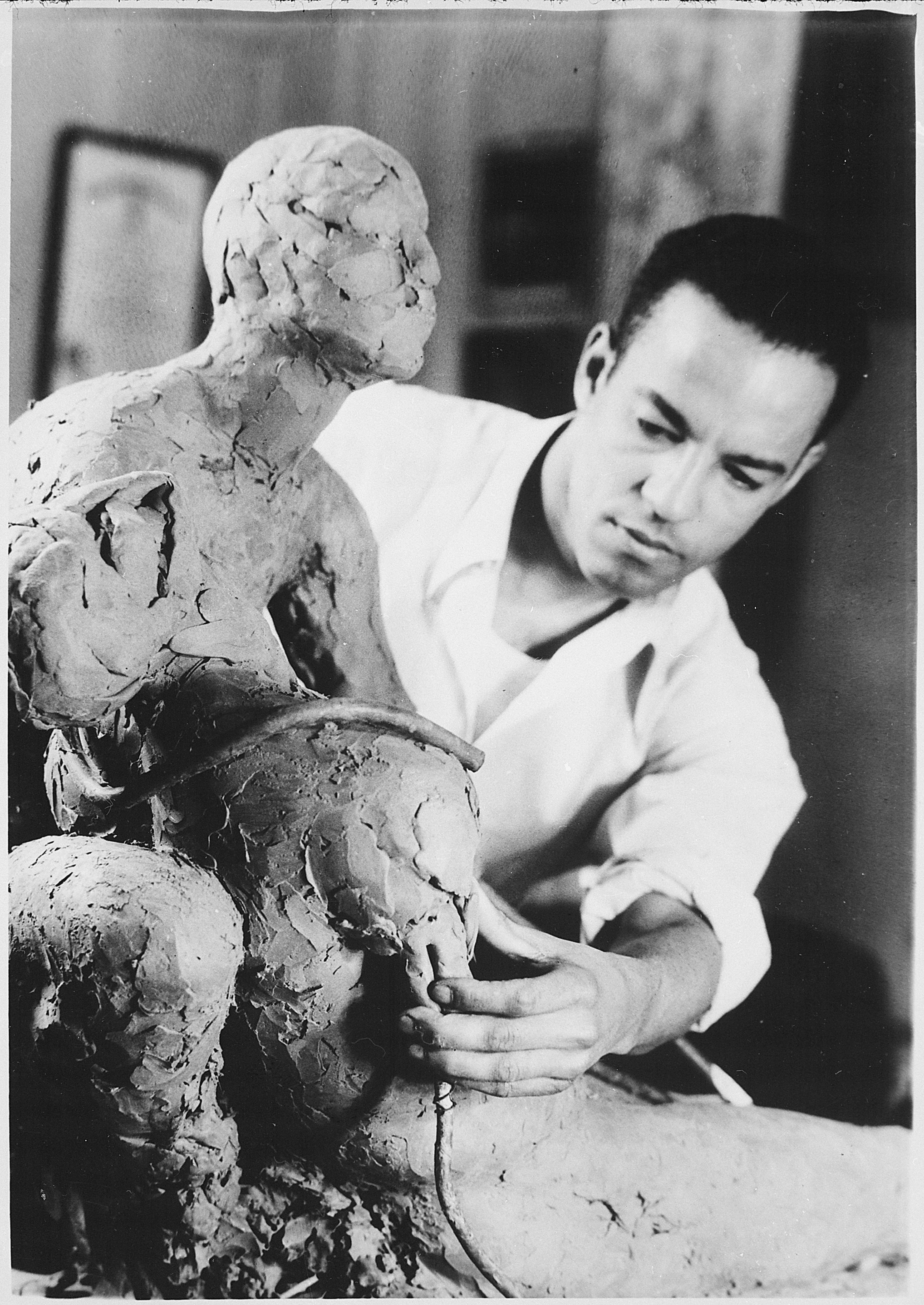
Sculptor Richmond Barthé working on a clay figure, n.d.

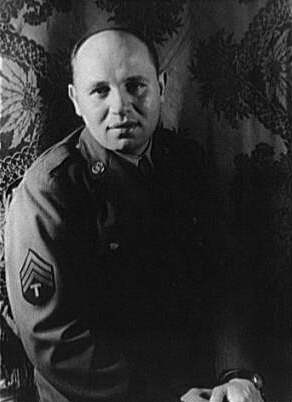
Artist Romare Bearden, photographed in his military uniform in 1944.

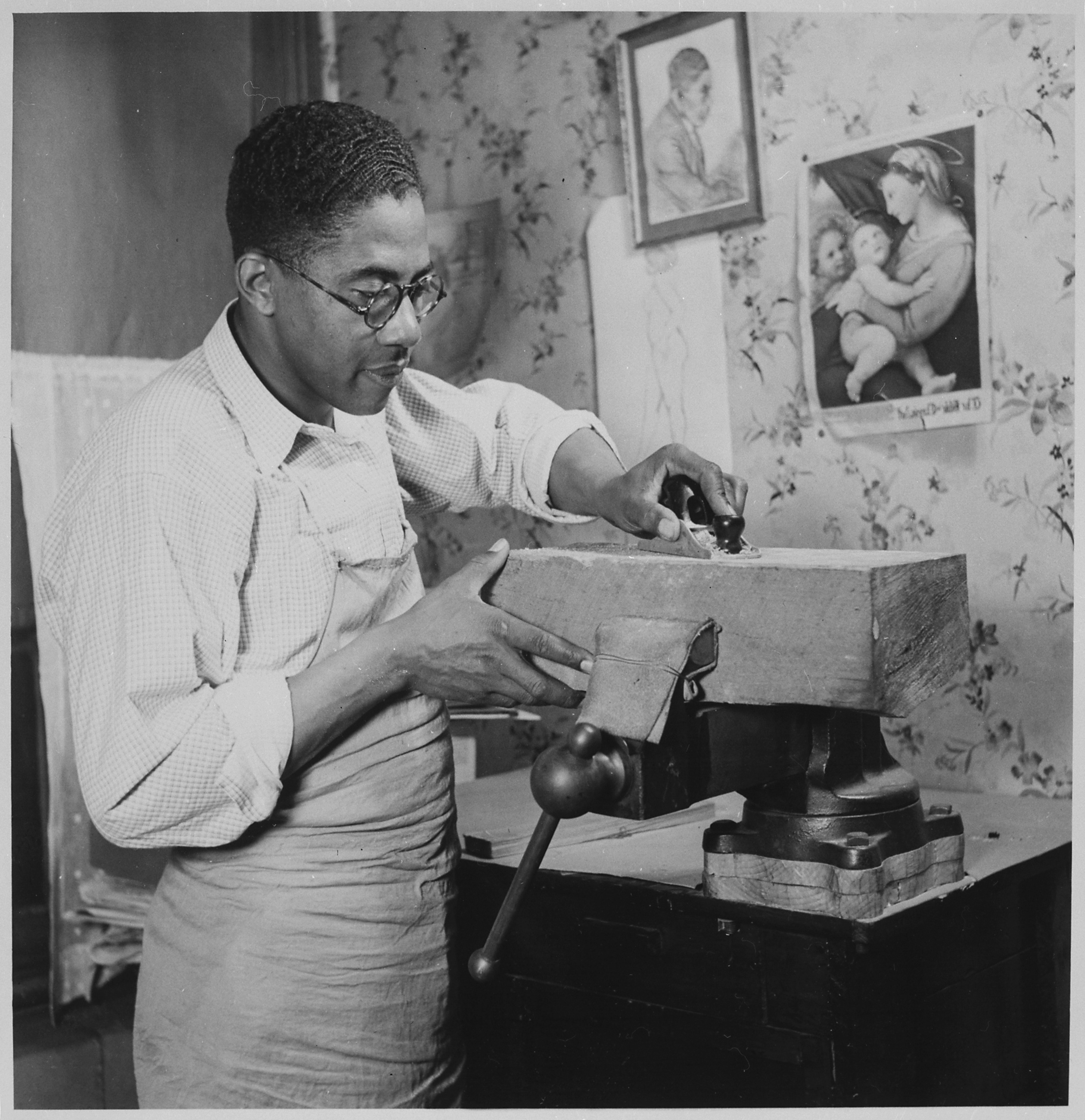
Sculptor Leslie Bolling carving a sculpture, n.d.

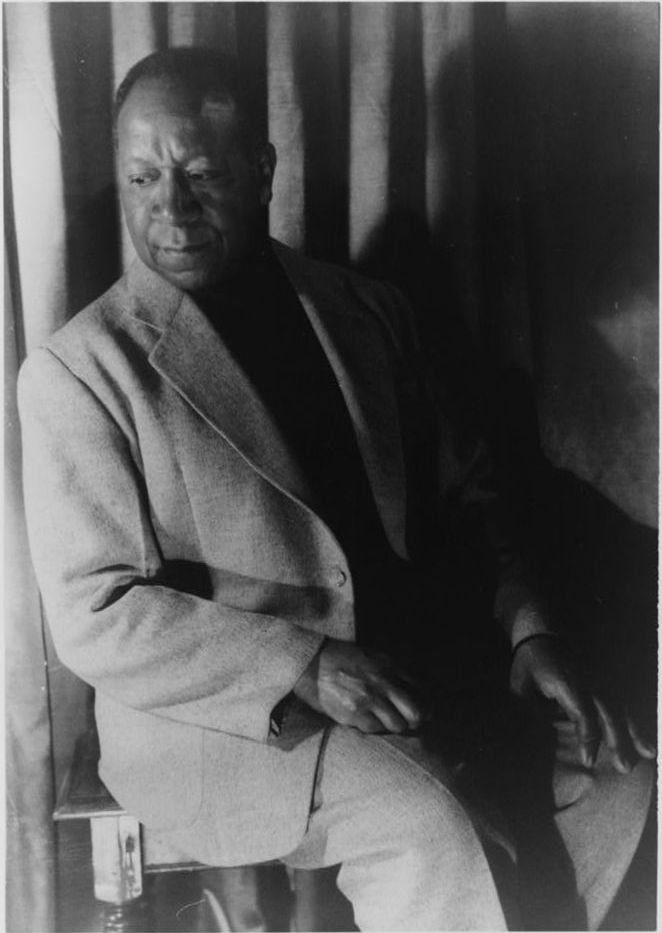
Modernist painter Beauford Delaney in 1952.

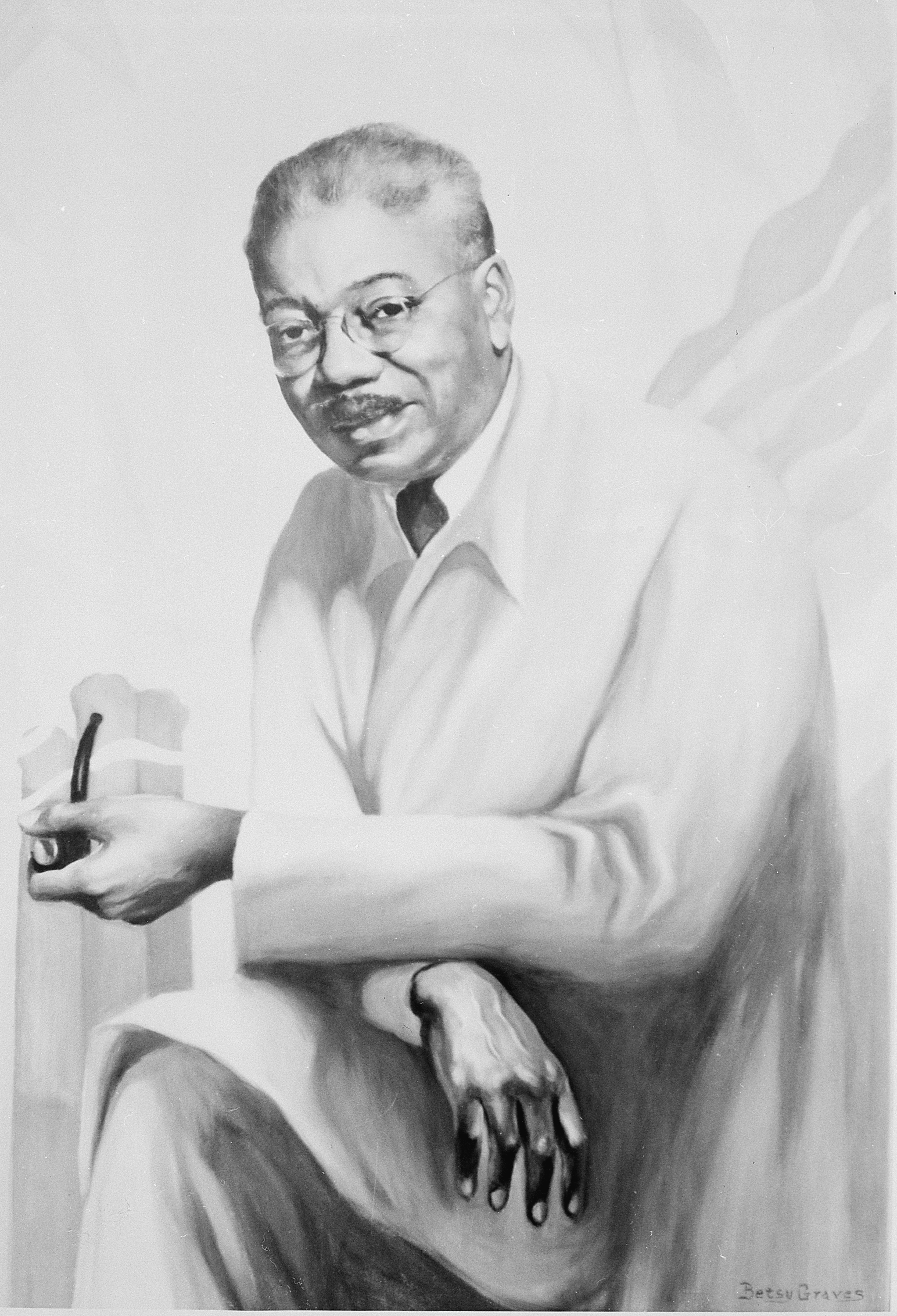
Painter and illustrator Aaron Douglas, n.d.

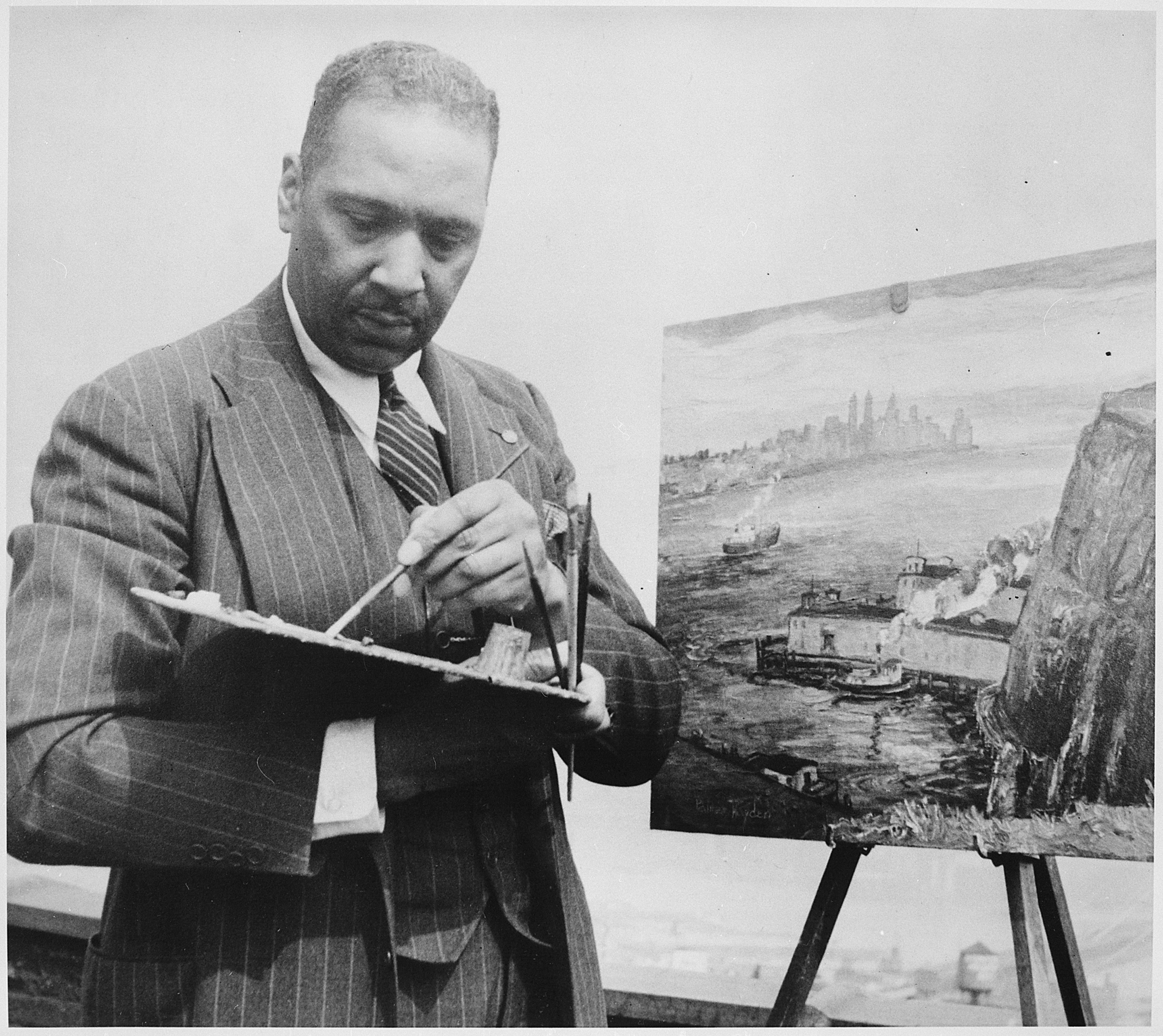
Painter Palmer Hayden working on a landscape, n.d.

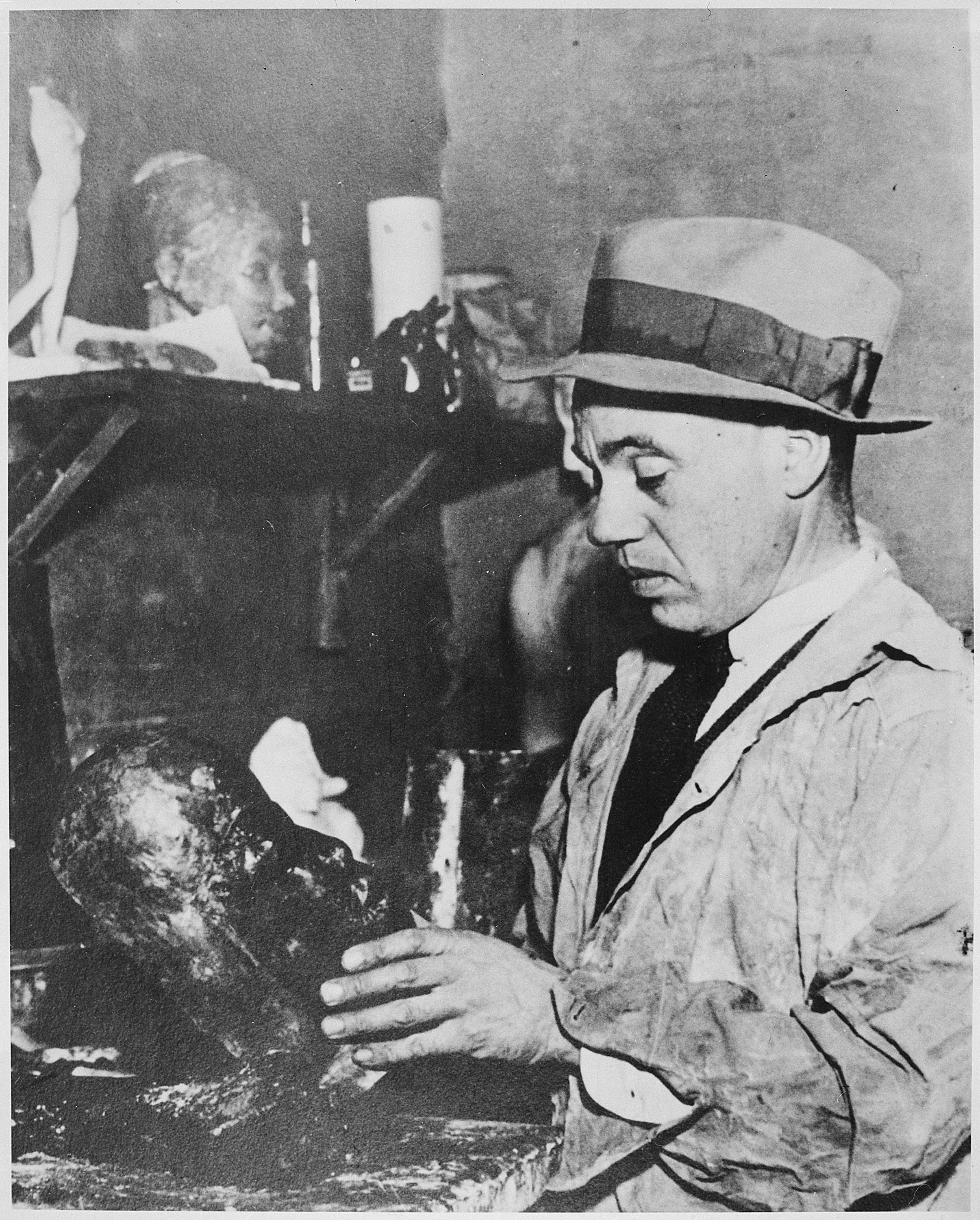
Artist Sargent Johnson, assessing his own sculpture, n.d.

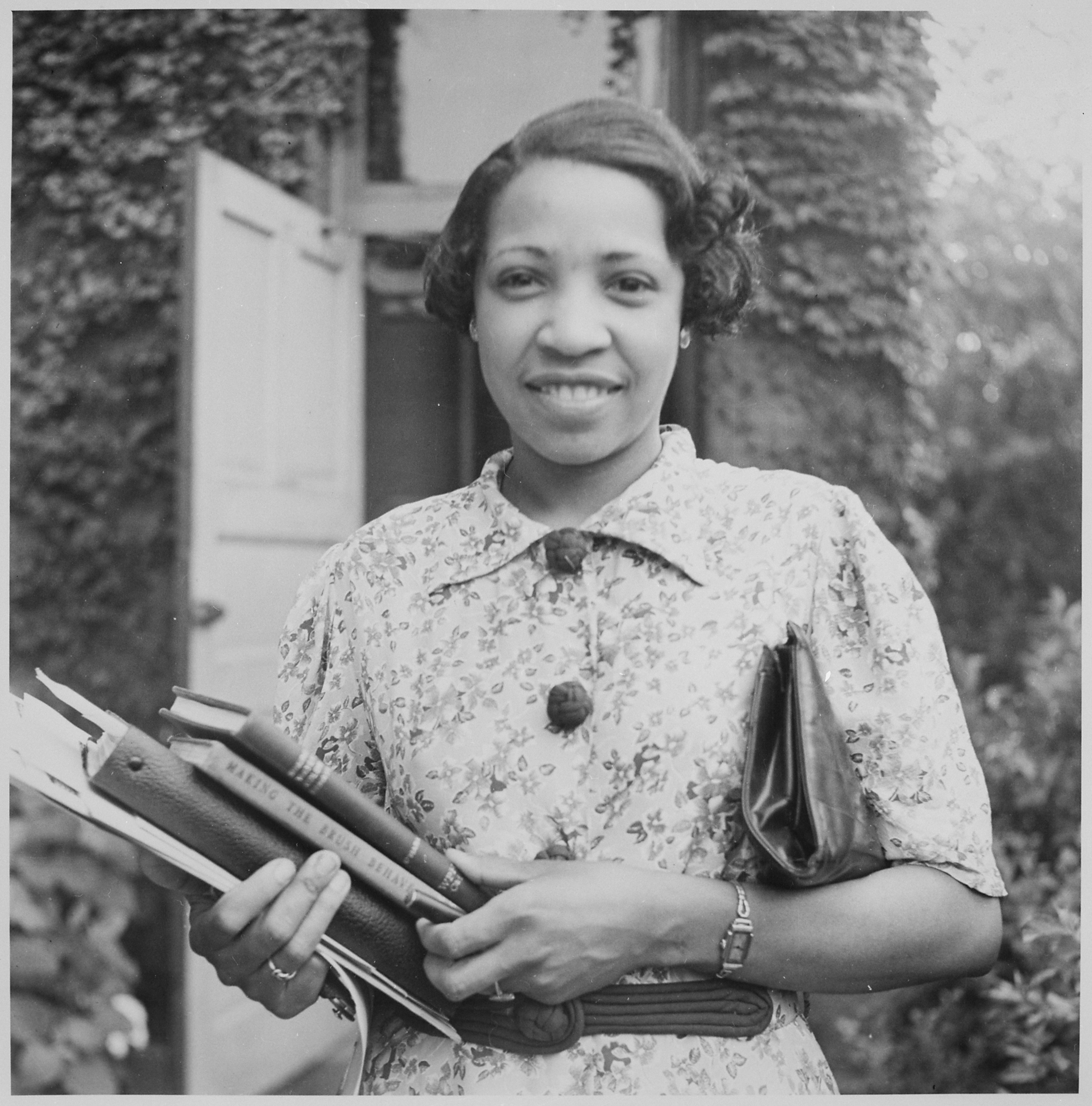
Artist Loïs Mailou Jones in 1936.

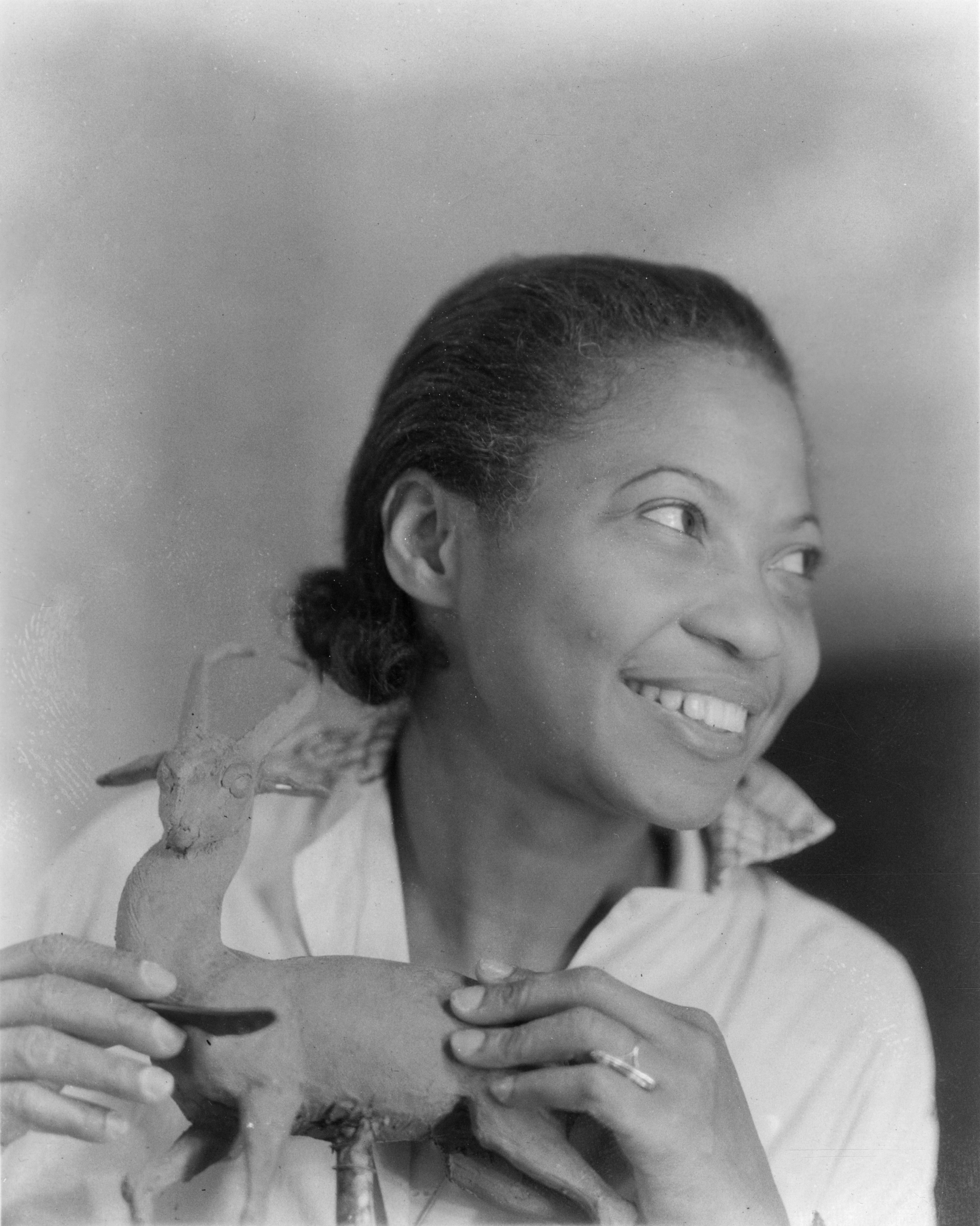
Sculptor Augusta Savage, photographed between 1935 and 1947.

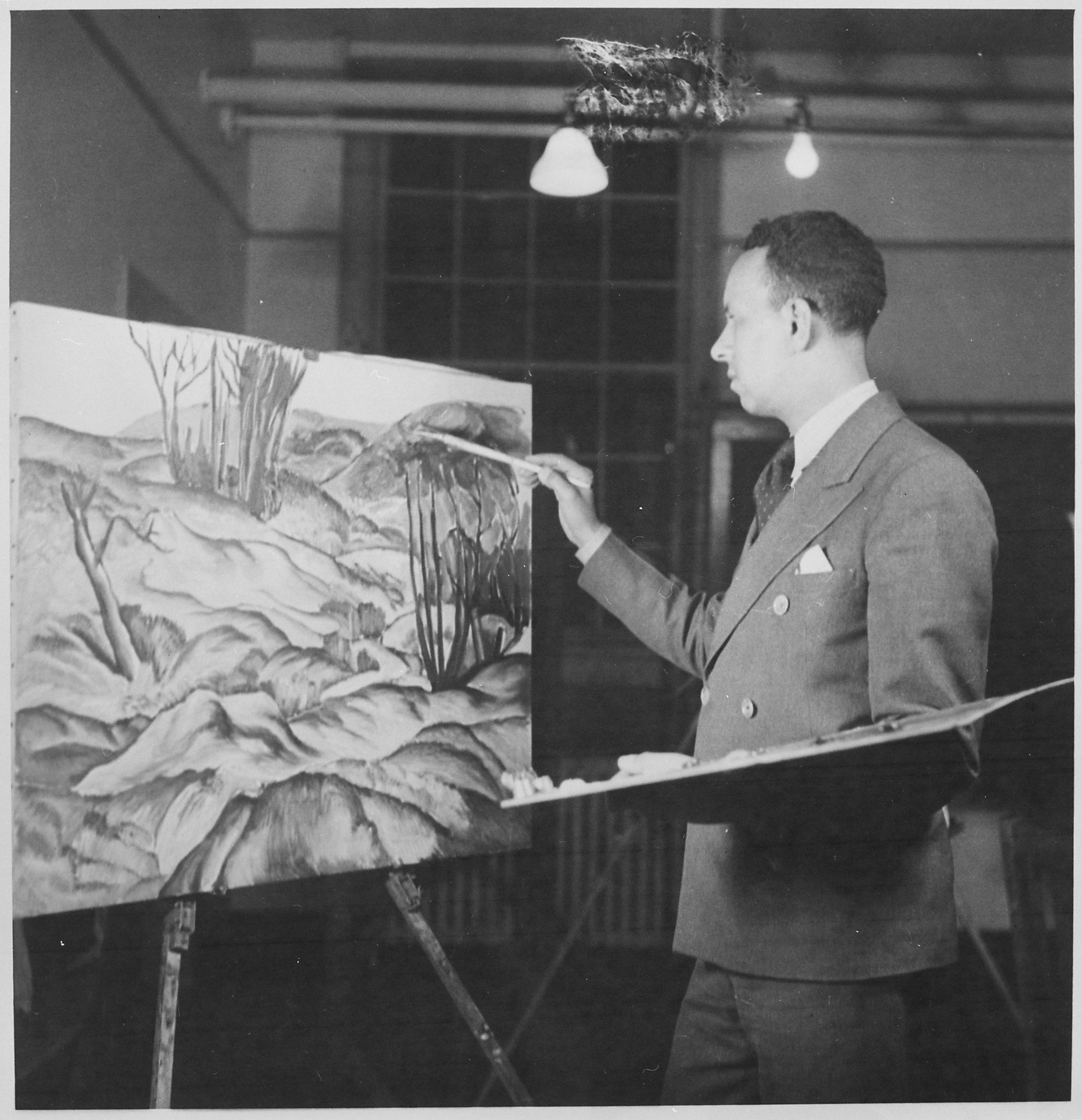
Painter Hale Woodruff at work on a canvas, c. 1936.

==== Contemporary ====
(Selection was limited by availability.)

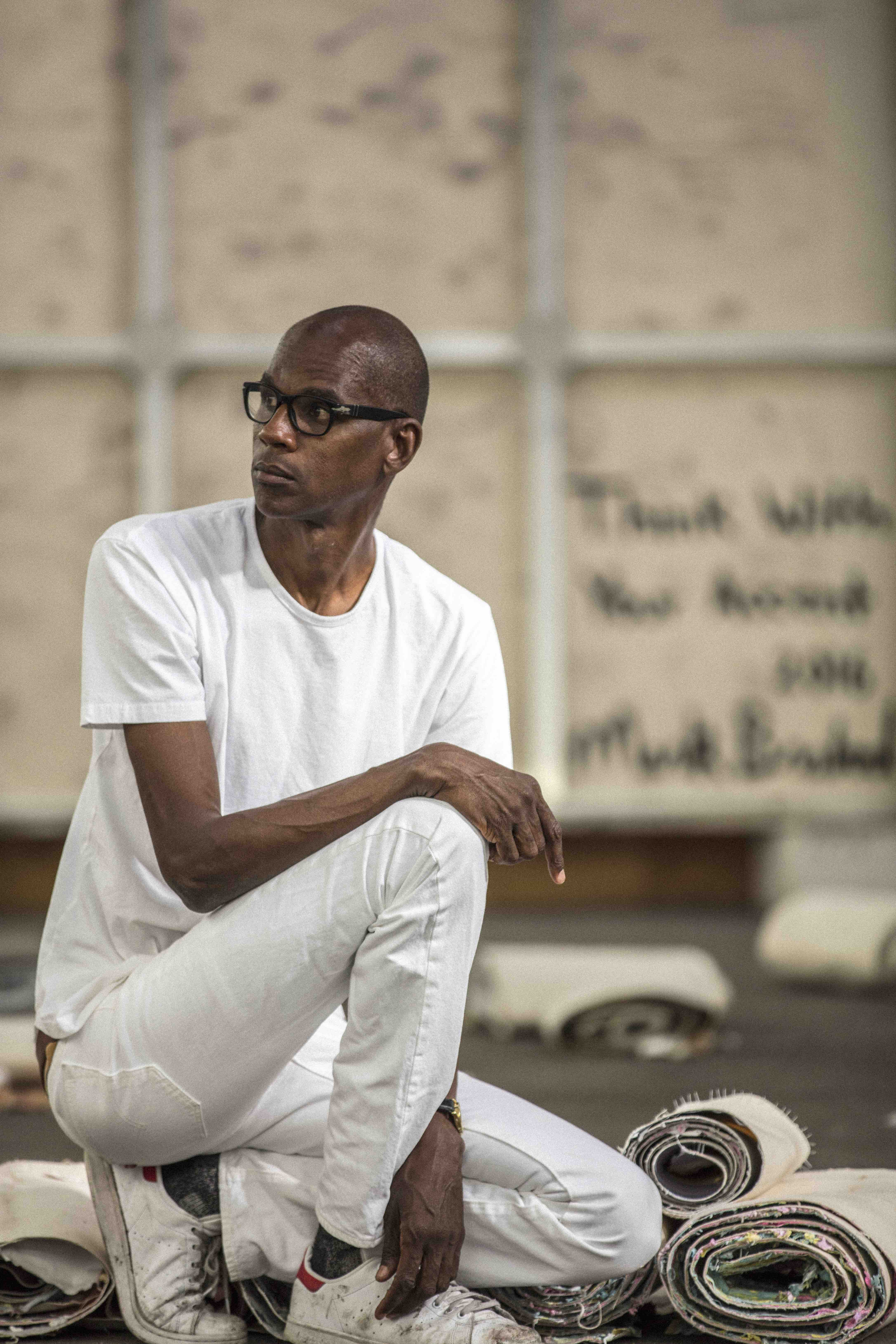
Painter and collagist Mark Bradford in 2016.

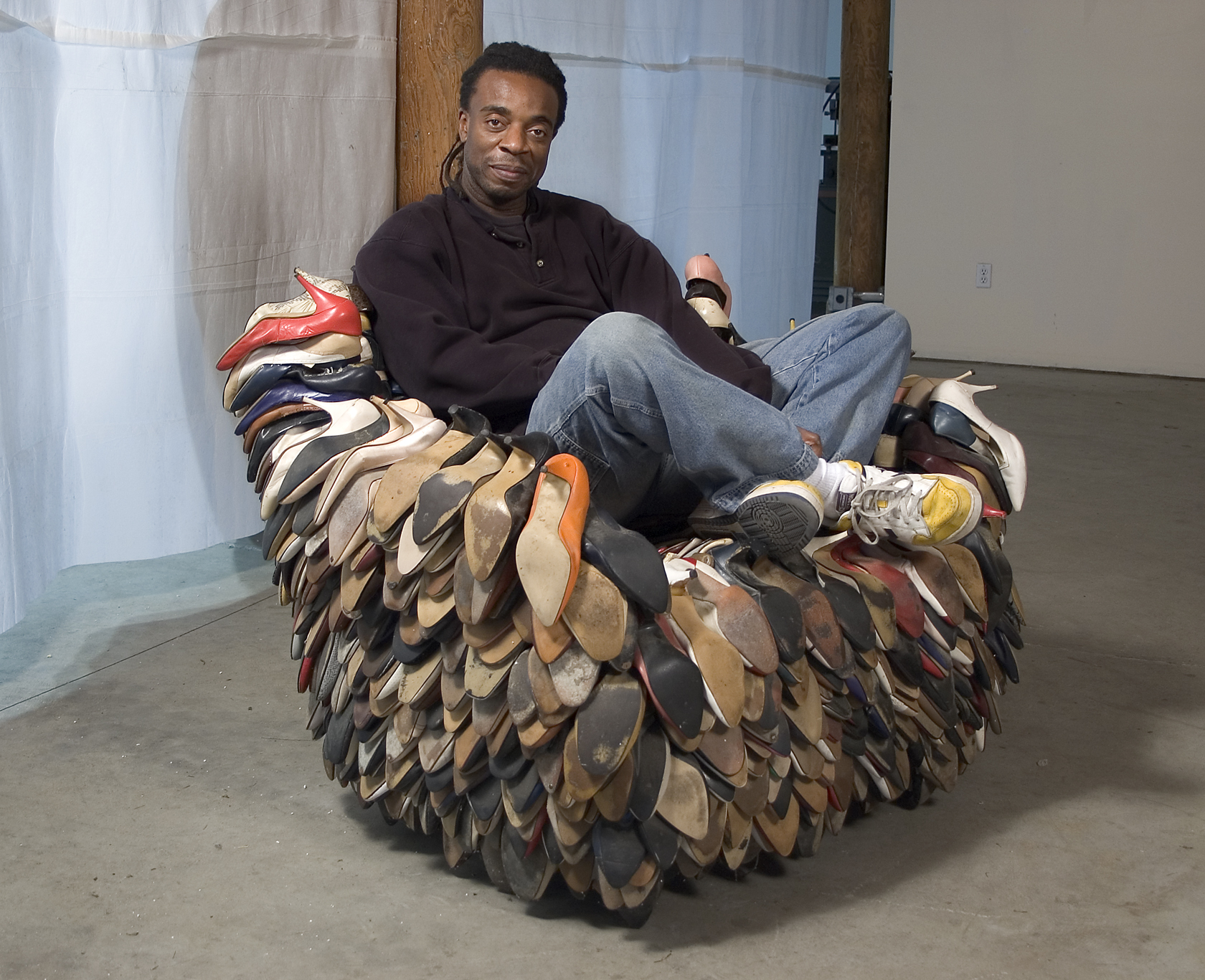
Sculptor, printer, and conceptual and visual artist Willie Cole in 2004.

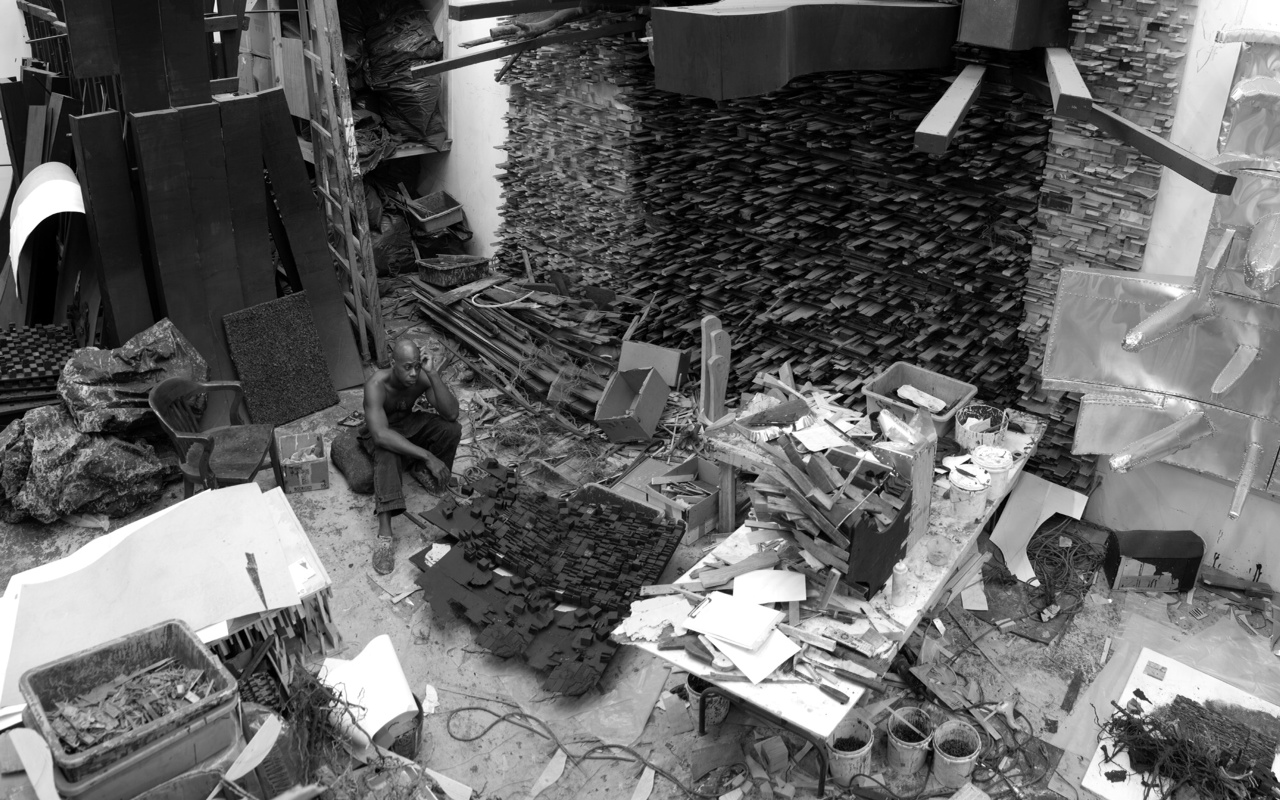
Artist Leonardo Drew in Brooklyn studio in 2012.

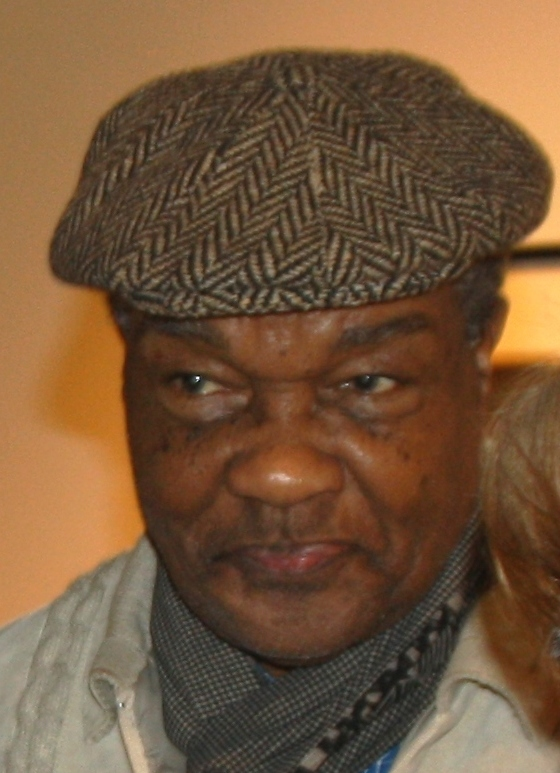
Artist, scholar and curator David C. Driskell in 2016.

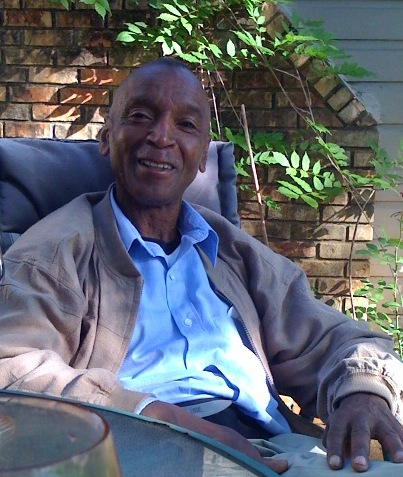
Sculptor and collagist Jerry Harris in 2008.

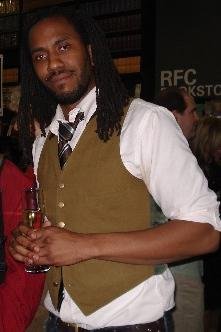
Conceptual post-black artist Rashid Johnson in 2008.

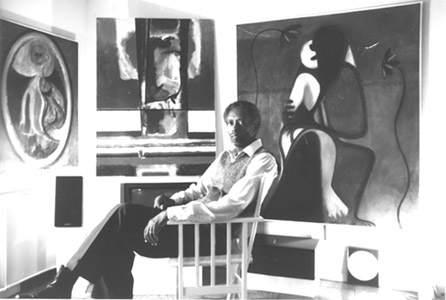
Painter, collagist and draftsman Eugene J. Martin in 1990.

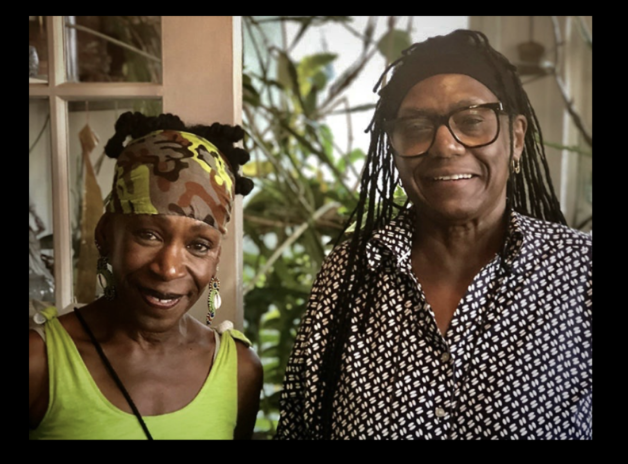
Artists Sana Musasama and Janet Olivia Henry in 2019.

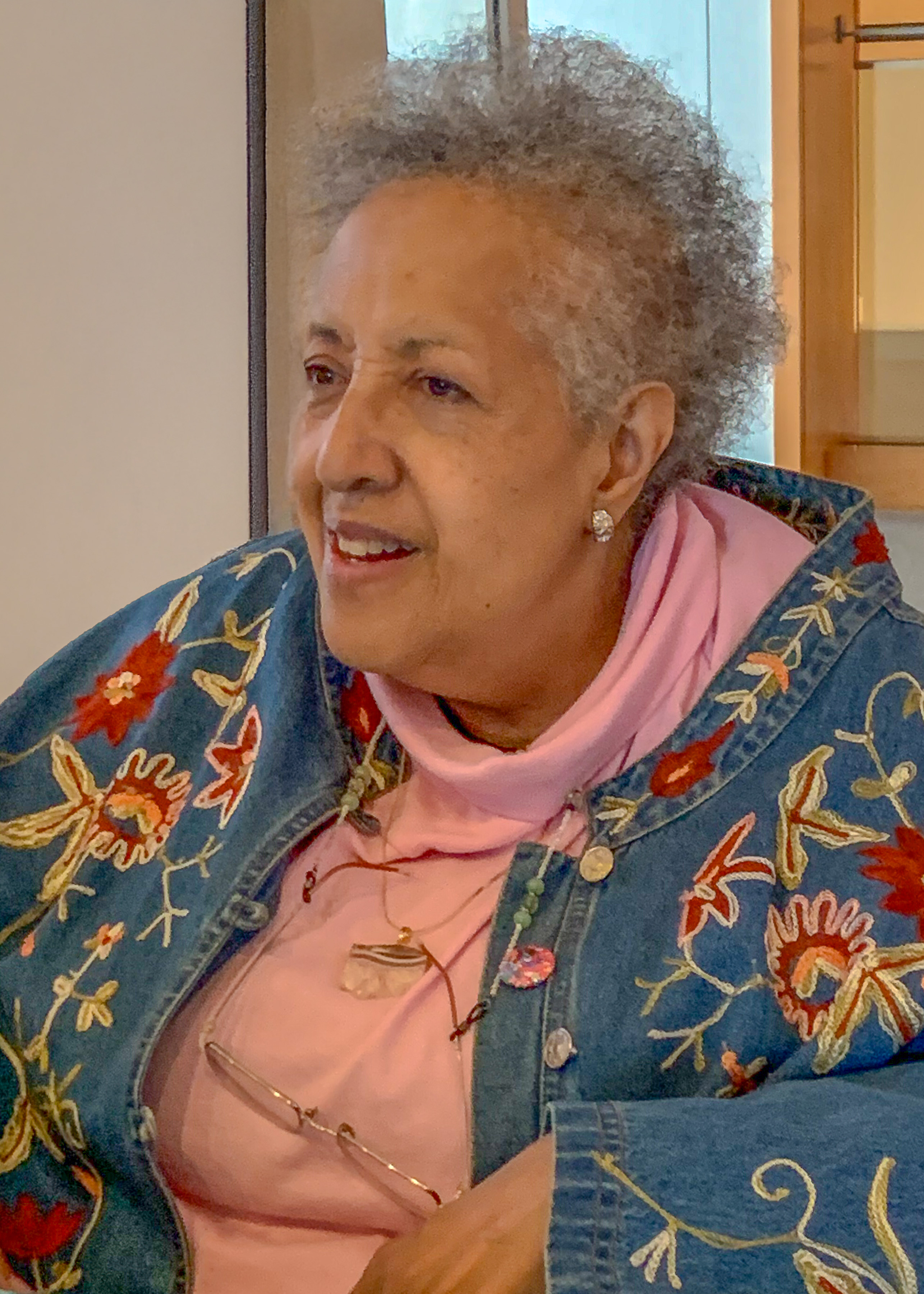
Painter and mixed media artist Howardena Pindell in 2019.

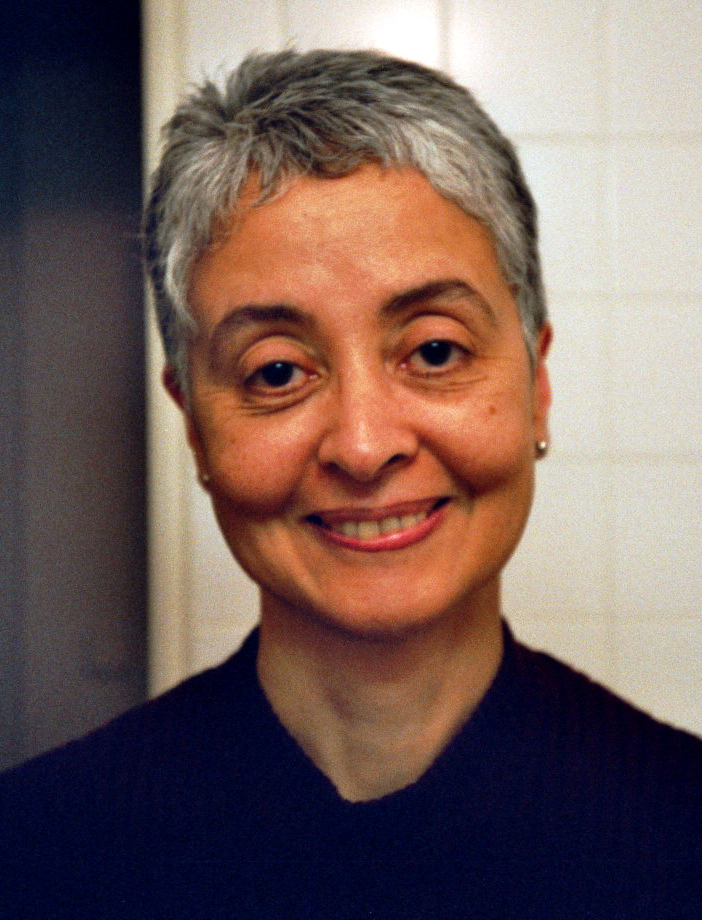
Conceptual artist Adrian Piper in 2005.

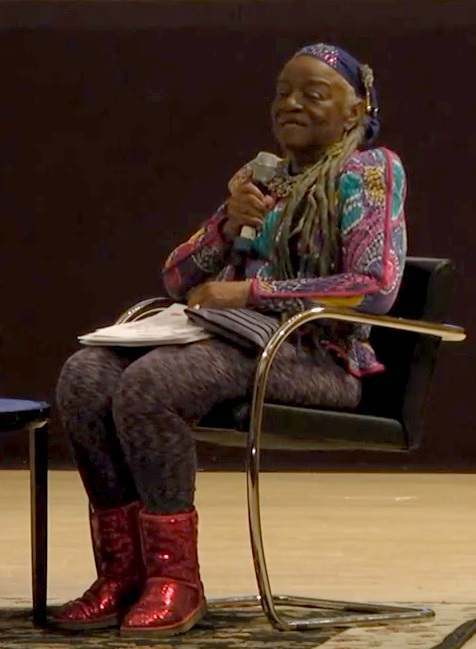
Painter and mixed media sculptor Faith Ringgold in 2017.

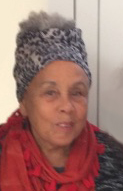
Assemblage artist Betye Saar in 2017.

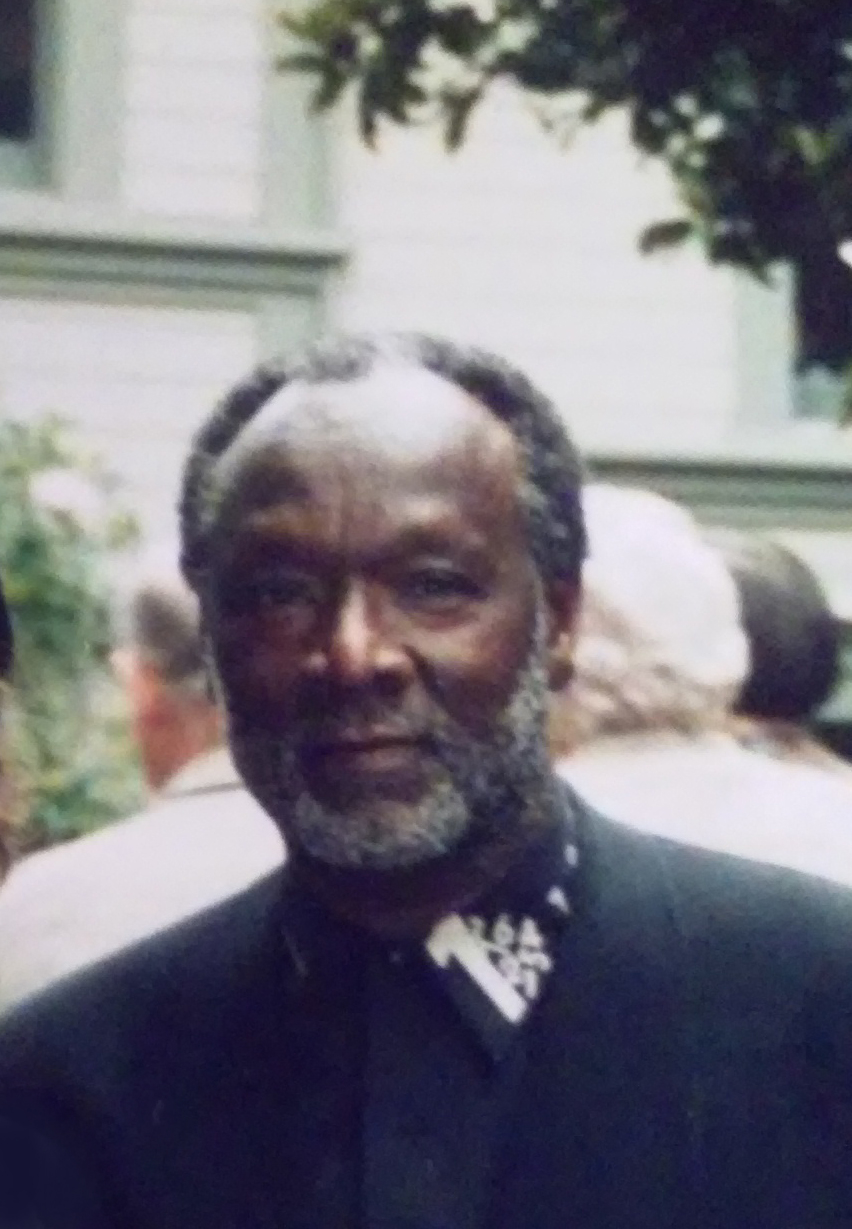
Multimedia painter Raymond Saunders in 1995.

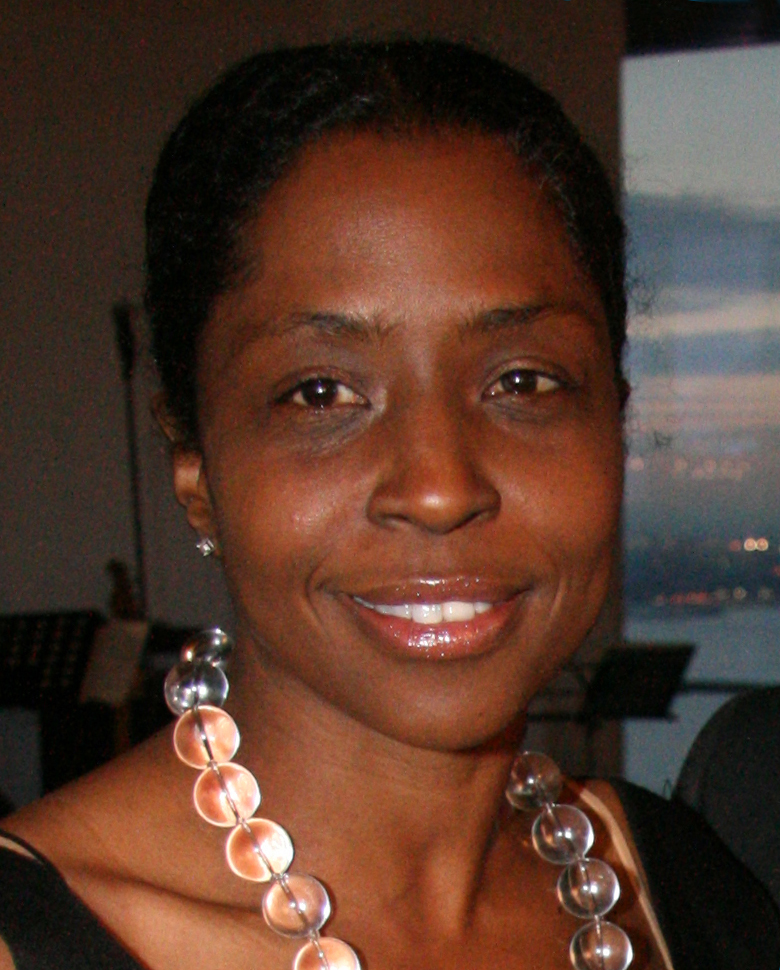
Photographer and multimedia artist Lorna Simpson in 2009.

== Collections of African-American art ==
Many American museums hold works by African-American artists, including Smithsonian American Art Museum Colleges and universities with important collections include Fisk University, Spelman College and Howard University. Other important collections of African-American art include the Walter O. Evans Collection of African American Art, the Paul R. Jones collections at the University of Delaware and University of Alabama, the David C. Driskell Center's art collection, the Harmon and Harriet Kelley Collection of African American Art, the Schomburg Center for Research in Black Culture, the Studio Museum in Harlem and the Mott-Warsh collection.

== See also ==
- African-American culture
- African-American literature
- African-American music
- Black Abstractionism
- Black Arts Movement
- Black Art: In the Absence of Light
- Chicano art
- Gullah/Geechee Cultural Heritage Corridor
- The Highwaymen (landscape artists)
- James A. Porter Colloquium on African American Art
- List of African-American visual artists
- Visual art of the United States

== Sources ==
- Romare Bearden, Harry Henderson, A History of African-American Artists. From 1792 to the Present, New York: Pantheon Books, 1993.
- Driskell, David C. (2001), The Other Side of Color: African American Art in the Collection of Camille O. and William H. Cosby Jr. Pomegranate. ISBN 978-0-7649-1455-3
- Sylvester, Melvin R. African Americans in Visual Arts: A Historical Perspective. Long Island University. Retrieved January 23, 2005.
- Perry, Regenia A. (1972). Selections of nineteenth-century Afro-American art. New York: The Metropolitan Museum of Art.
