= Melvin Edwards =

American sculptor (1937–2026)

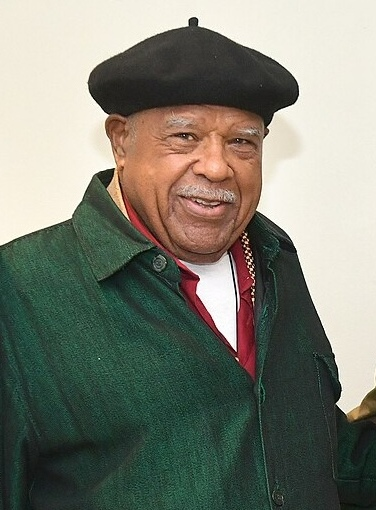
- Edwards in 2024
- Born: Melvin Eugene Edwards Jr. May 4, 1937; Houston, Texas, U.S.
- Died: March 30, 2026 (aged 88); Baltimore, Maryland, U.S.
- Education: University of Southern California (BFA)
- Known for: Sculpture
- Notable work: Lynch Fragments (1963–1966, 1973, 1978–2026); Rockers (1970–2026); Breaking of the Chains (1995); David's Dream (2023)
- Spouses: Karen Hamre (m. 1960, divorced) Jayne Cortez (m. 1975; died 2012) Diala Touré (before 2026)
- Children: 3

Melvin Eugene Edwards Jr. (May 4, 1937 – March 30, 2026) was an American abstract sculptor, printmaker, and arts educator. Edwards, an African-American artist, was raised in segregated communities in Texas and an integrated community in Ohio. He moved to California in 1955, beginning his professional art career while an undergraduate student. Originally trained as a painter, Edwards began exploring sculpture and welding techniques in Los Angeles in the early 1960s, before moving again to New York in 1967.

Edwards was best known for his Lynch Fragments sculptures, a series of small, abstract steel assemblage sculptures made with spikes, scissors, chains, and other small metal objects welded together into wall reliefs, which he first began making in 1963. In addition to their titular reference to lynching, these works were described by the artist as metaphors for the struggles and successes of African Americans living in the United States.

He was also known for his minimalist sculptural environments built with strands of barbed wire and chain beginning in the late 1960s; his kinetic Rockers sculptures, painted metal works built on discs that can rock back and forth; and his monumental outdoor sculptures, often characterized by the use of straight-edged triangular, circular, and rectangular metal forms along with oversized chain motifs. Edwards also worked extensively in printmaking, beginning in college and continuing throughout his career. Edwards's works, despite containing many elements of abstract art, often deviated from a pure expression of abstraction through explicit references to African-American and African history as well as contemporary politics and events in their titles and underlying materials.

Edwards mounted more than a dozen solo exhibitions in museums and galleries across the United States and internationally. In 1970, he was the first African-American sculptor to receive a solo exhibition at the Whitney Museum in New York. Following a period of decline in attention from curators and critics in New York in the late 1970s and 1980s, Edwards's art was included in several high-profile national and international exhibitions in the 2000s and 2010s, leading to an increase in critical attention toward his work both within the art world and more broadly. Edwards also taught art in several universities across the country, including a 30-year teaching career at Rutgers University, from which he retired in 2002. He lived and worked between upstate New York, New Jersey, and Senegal, as well as Baltimore toward the end of his life.

== Early life and education ==
Melvin Eugene Edwards Jr. was born on May 4, 1937, in Houston, Texas, the eldest of four children born to Thelmarie Edwards and Melvin Edwards Sr. The family moved in 1942 to McNair, Texas, where Edwards started first grade, before moving again to Dayton, Ohio, in 1944 for Melvin Sr.'s job at the Boy Scouts of America. Edwards attended the racially integrated schools Wogoman Elementary and Irving Elementary in Dayton. He said that he first began to understand the concept of art after his fourth-grade art teacher at Irving had the class practice figure drawing; while the other students drew cartoon images of their classmate who was posing, Edwards noticed that his own drawing was a more realistic portrayal: "this was a revelation to me. It was a surprise... that that could be done." He often took trips with his family and school to the Dayton Art Institute.

In 1949, his family moved in with Edwards's grandmother in Houston, having returned to Texas for his father's new job with Houston Lighting & Power. His parents divorced later in his childhood. Edwards grew up in Houston during a time of racial segregation, attending E. O. Smith Junior High School and Phillis Wheatley High School. He began seriously making art at a young age, encouraged by his parents; his father was himself an amateur painter who built Edwards's first easel with a family friend. While attending high school, a teacher introduced Edwards to abstract art and he was one of two students selected from his school to take art classes at the Museum of Fine Arts, Houston. He was also an avid athlete, playing football throughout high school.

After graduating from high school, he moved to Los Angeles in 1955, living with his aunt and uncle while working part-time to pay for courses at Los Angeles City College. While in college, he held a number of jobs, including at the post office, in a warehouse, and as a hospital porter. He was interested in studying art but at the same time wanted to continue his sports career, so he transferred to the University of Southern California (USC), where he was able both to play football and study. His first period of study at USC was primarily focused on painting, and his professors included Francis de Erdely and Hans Burkhardt. Edwards then accepted a scholarship to attend the Los Angeles County Art Institute (now the Otis College of Art and Design), his first sculpture teachers there being Renzo Fenci and Joe Mugnaini, but he transferred back to USC after six months when he received a scholarship to return to play football. Edwards nearly failed one of his undergraduate history courses at USC; he attributed his grade to a disagreement over the professor's Eurocentric views. This inspired his later visits to Africa to learn about the history of the continent.

While attending USC, Edwards met fellow art student Karen Hamre; the two married in 1960 and Hamre gave birth to their first daughter the same year. Edwards became friends with several other artists in Los Angeles, including Marvin Harden, Daniel LaRue Johnson, Ron Miyashiro, Ed Bereal, and David Novros. It was around this period that Edwards met Charles White, one of the best-known African-American artists of the era, who had moved to Los Angeles in 1956; the actor Ivan Dixon would soon purchase one of Edwards's works as a gift for White. Edwards also began spending time at Dwan Gallery, owned by Virginia Dwan, meeting well-known artists associated with minimalism and land art.

Edwards finished the majority of his undergraduate coursework by 1960, although he did not receive his degree until 1965, due to an uncompleted language course necessary for graduation.

== Life and career ==
=== 1960s ===
==== 1960–1964: Early career, first Lynch Fragments ====
After finishing the majority of his studies at USC, Edwards asked graduate student and sculptor George Baker to teach him to weld. Edwards took additional night classes with Baker in 1962 to learn more about the technique and process. To help support his family, Edwards found employment in a ceramics factory owned by fellow USC graduate Tony Hill, where he was trained in specialized finishing techniques to complete the modernist ceramics produced in the factory. In addition, he later found work at a film production company owned by Novros's father. The company's office was located near June Wayne's Tamarind Lithography Workshop (now the Tamarind Institute), and Edwards would visit the center during his lunch breaks, meeting influential national artists such as George Sugarman, Richard Hunt, Leon Golub, and Louise Nevelson, as well as Museum of Modern Art (MoMA) print curator Riva Castleman. Living in Los Angeles, Edwards was also introduced to the work of a number of Mexican muralist artists, including David Alfaro Siqueiros, Diego Rivera, and José Clemente Orozco, which he said inspired him to similarly draw on his cultural background in his art in order to communicate his social and political views.

Edwards spent several years in the early 1960s experimenting with different welding techniques, eventually buying his own equipment and setting up a studio in a garage that Hill owned. In 1963, this experimentation resulted in a small abstract relief sculpture titled Some Bright Morning, comprising a shallow cylindrical form accented by bits of steel, a blade-shaped triangle of steel, and a short chain hanging from the piece with a small lump of metal at its end. Edwards explained that the title of the piece was a reference to a story from Ralph Ginzburg's anthology 100 Years of Lynchings, a compilation of reports on lynchings in the United States published the year prior. The story, as retold by Edwards, relays the narrative of a black family in Florida successfully fighting back against their white neighbors who had threatened to come to the property on "some bright morning" (Note: While Edwards has used the quote "some bright morning" in reference to the Florida story from Ginzburg's anthology, the phrase was not actually used in that story. The quote originates from a different narrative in Ginzburg's book about a farmer in Georgia who was lynched in 1919 after engaging in labor organizing.) in order to kill them. This sculpture became the first in his Lynch Fragments series. Partly inspired by developments in the Civil Rights Movement and unrest in Los Angeles over the police killing of a black man in 1962, these welded metal wall reliefs are usually small in size. Edwards described the series as a metaphor for the struggles experienced by African Americans. He employed a variety of metal objects to create these abstract works, including hammer heads, scissors, locks, chains, and railroad spikes.

Edwards traveled to New York for the first time in 1963, visiting MoMA after having heard that it was possible to meet well-known artists who were working as guards there. The first person he met at the museum was the artist William Majors, a member of the African-American art group Spiral. On his trip to the city, Edwards also met artist Hale Woodruff, another member of Spiral, and showed Woodruff several of his Lynch Fragments sculptures.

In the mid-1960s, Edwards began assisting Dwan Gallery with freelance repairs for sculptures and installations by several of the gallery's artists, including Jean Tinguely's mechanical sculptures. Edwards also helped artist Mark di Suvero to install a number of works alongside a highway in Los Angeles.

==== 1965–1969: Rising recognition, move to New York, Smokehouse ====
The first one-person exhibition of sculpture by Edwards was held in 1965 at the Santa Barbara Museum of Art. He exhibited several of his Lynch Fragments sculptures there, along with the first iteration of a work titled Chaino, which consisted of a small abstract metal assemblage suspended in midair with chains attached to the walls and a metal rod hanging from the ceiling; he later built a metal armature for Chaino so that it could be displayed suspended without the need of a wall or ceiling rod. Writing in Artforum, critic David Gebhard positively reviewed the exhibition, saying: "Perfection of workmanship and a full understanding of material has been united with the formal content of each work." In 1965, Edwards also began teaching at the Chouinard Art Institute (now the California Institute of the Arts). His second and third children, twin daughters, were born that same year.

The Lifted X (1965) at the Museum of Modern Art.

Around this time, he also began to create a new series of works comprising dense central abstract assemblage forms suspended within various types of metal enclosures, similar to Chaino. He created several such works in 1965, including The Lifted X, named in honor of Malcolm X after his murder in February that year; this piece consists of a large metal form with a meat hook hanging from its underside, lifted above a metal armature with an "X" formed by the bars on its base. Toward the end of 1965, he showed several of these works in a group exhibition of five younger artists from L.A. at the Los Angeles County Museum of Art. In 1966, Edwards created Cotton Hangup, a similar assemblage form, hung at first from the ceiling; however, he eventually reworked the piece so as to let it be suspended in mid-air from three chains anchored to the gallery ceiling and walls. While he believed that some viewers would interpret these suspended chain works as thematically oriented around lynching, Edwards said that the works represented for him "an opportunity to investigate the principles of suspension".

His work was included in the historical survey exhibition The Negro in American Art, organized by art historian James Porter at UCLA in 1966. Sam Gilliam was also included in the exhibition, and after Edwards saw Gilliam's work, the two became friends and colleagues. Edwards visited New York again in 1966 to search for housing and studio space in the city for his family to relocate. On this trip, he helped his friend Robert Grosvenor install a sculpture in the exhibition Primary Structures at the Jewish Museum, which introduced Edwards to a broader group of artists working in minimalism. Also in 1966, Edwards participated in the construction of the Peace Tower in Los Angeles, an abstract public sculpture and exhibition space designed to protest the Vietnam War; Edwards and di Suvero constructed the metal armature serving as the base. Art historian Kellie Jones described Edwards as "one of the city's most visible African-American artists" by 1967.

Edwards moved to New York in January 1967, relocating with his wife and children. Johnson and Miyashiro, who had both themselves moved to the city from California, helped the family settle. He had been encouraged by other artists, Sugarman in particular, to move to New York in order to further his career and find more opportunities. He also made the decision to stop creating new sculptures for the Lynch Fragments series, choosing instead to focus on other, larger works. Edwards and Hamre decided to separate shortly after they moved to New York, and she returned to California with their daughters. The couple divorced soon afterwards. After moving to New York, Edwards secured a position teaching art at Orange County Community College in the Hudson Valley north of the city.

He was soon introduced to the artist William T. Williams at a party for Sugarman after the artist Al Held recommended they connect; they quickly became close friends and colleagues. Around this period, Edwards also met the painter and writer Frank Bowling, another black abstract artist, who became a champion of Edwards's work in his criticism. In the summer of 1968, Edwards attended a residency at the Sabathani Community Center in Minneapolis, Minnesota, where he began to create large abstract geometric painted-metal sculptures; the Walker Art Center exhibited the works soon afterwards, one of the museum's first exhibitions of public sculpture. These painted sculptures used bright, primary colors, a theme he was inspired to explore by Sugarman's work. Edwards then traveled to Los Angeles, to install a large solo exhibition at the Barnsdall Art Center, before returning to New York to join Williams and his new initiative Smokehouse.

Smokehouse (also known as Smokehouse Associates) was a New York-based community wall-painting initiative developed by Williams, named for the outdoor structure often used in the rural southern United States to cure meat. The project was born from a desire shared by Williams and others to develop public art projects that could have a positive social effect on their communities. Smokehouse created a series of wall paintings consisting of hard-edge graphics and geometric patterns, designed and executed with local community members, all located along several streets in Harlem. The group's ethos was in direct contrast to a similar initiative in New York, City Walls, which had begun several years prior and which consisted of mostly white artists displaying their own artwork on buildings without consulting the residents, an approach the Smokehouse artists believed to be self-centered. Although Smokehouse was primarily community-based, the group did give several presentations about their initiative to art world audiences; Edwards described these presentations as semi-performance art, wherein the artists would throw black-eyed peas at the audiences during the lecture as a provocation and a demonstration of "an example of African culture transposed to here". Edwards later connected his time with Smokehouse to his interest in Mexican muralists such as Orozco and Siqueiros. He participated primarily during the summers of 1968 and 1969.

Edwards moved into a farmhouse in Orange County in the fall of 1968, living alone. During this period, he began developing a new series of barbed wire sculptural installations. These works comprised strands of barbed wire and chain strung in different shapes and patterns from walls and ceilings in gallery spaces, extending into the room to form environments rather than discrete individual sculptures. In early 1969, Edwards's friend from Los Angeles, Bob Rogers, suggested that he create illustrations for a poetry collection by Jayne Cortez. Edwards and Cortez had met briefly in California, but were reacquainted and became closer in New York after Edwards provided several drawings for her first book, Pissstained Stairs and the Monkey Man's Wares.

Edwards, Williams, and Gilliam exhibited their work together with Williams's former classmate Stephan Kelsey (Note: Kelsey's first name is spelled variously as "Stephan" by Binstock and Schmidt Campbell, as "Stephen" by Godfrey, and as "Steven" by Craft and Booker.) in June 1969 at the Studio Museum in Harlem for the exhibition X to the Fourth Power. Edwards showed the first of his barbed-wire installations, including Pyramid Up and Down Pyramid, a pyramidal form made with lengths of barbed wire stretched across a corner of the gallery. Edwards, Williams, and Gilliam, all African-American artists making abstract art, would go on to stage several additional exhibitions as a trio in the 1970s. At the time of the exhibition, some black artists, curators, and activists had begun to view art as a secondary concern to the needs of political developments such as the rise of the black power movement, preferring art of the era that served an explicit functional purpose within a social movement rather than art made as aesthetic exploration or for non-political use, including abstract art, a debate that was ongoing within the Studio Museum itself. The works that Edwards exhibited, along with those of his fellow artists, were explicitly non-representational and did not serve a political function; several reviews of the exhibition focused on this perceived tension.

In the fall of 1969, Bowling curated the exhibition 5+1 (Note: The title of the exhibition is a reference to the nationalities of the artists: five Americans plus Bowling, a citizen of the United Kingdom born in British Guiana.) at SUNY Stony Brook featuring work by six black artists making abstract art: Edwards, Williams, Johnson, Al Loving, Jack Whitten, and Bowling himself. Edwards exhibited the second of his barbed-wire installations, Curtain for William and Peter, a wall of strands of barbed wire hung from the ceiling that ran the entire length of the gallery and divided the space in two, named for Williams and the artist Peter Bradley.

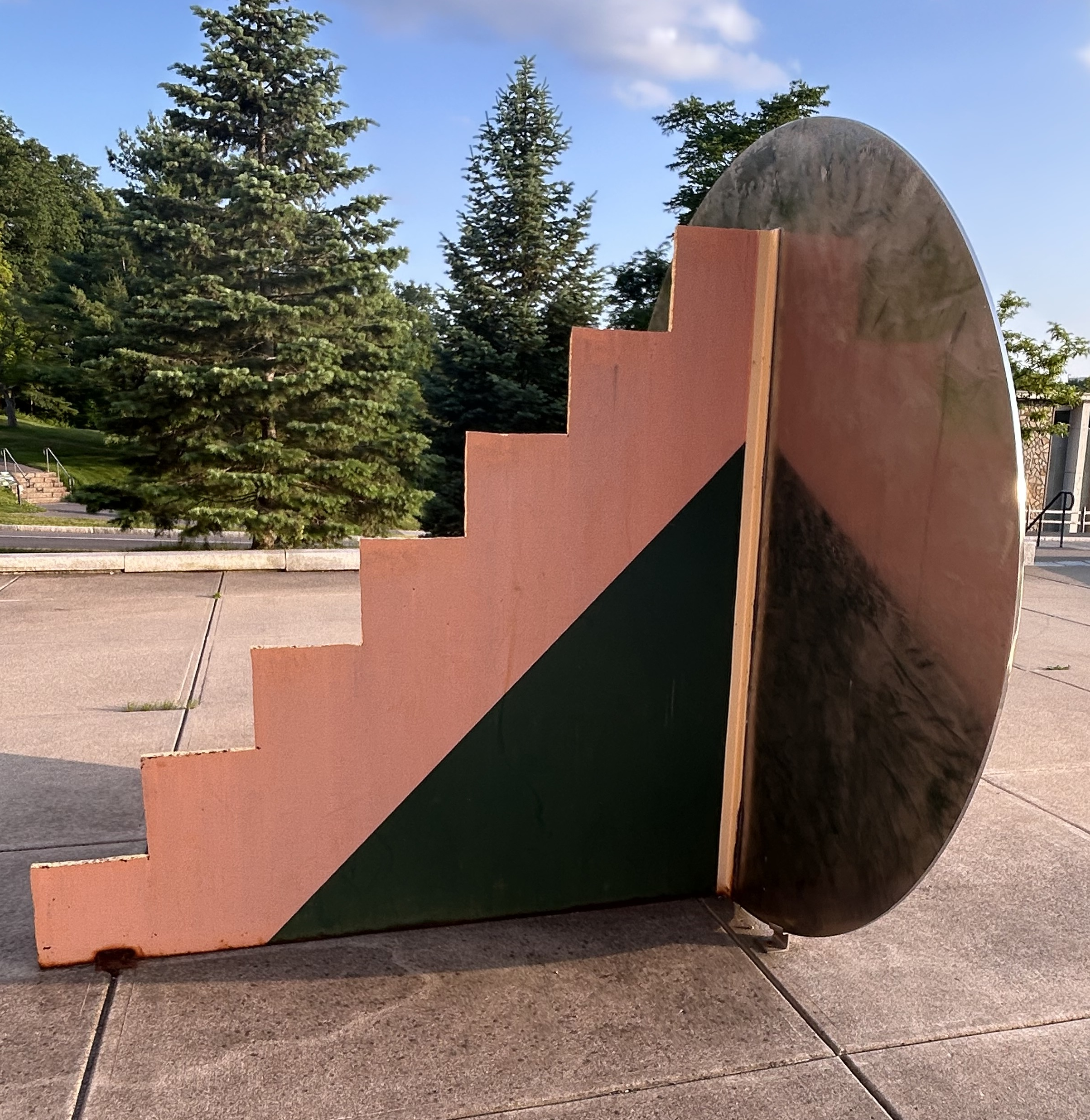
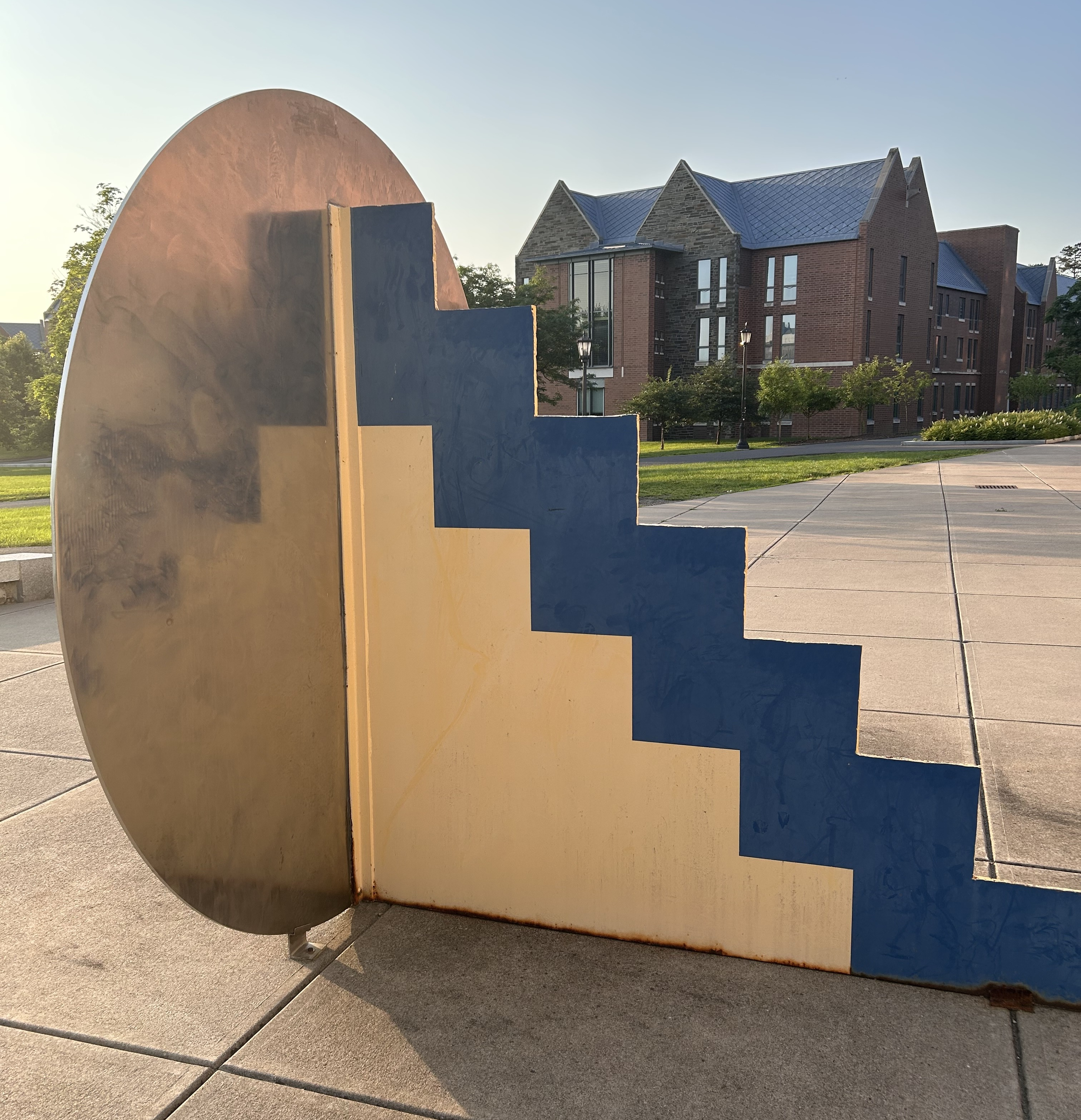
Both sides of Edwards's first public sculpture commission, Homage to My Father and the Spirit (1969), at Cornell University.

Edwards also completed his first major public commission in 1969, the outdoor sculpture Homage to My Father and the Spirit, created for Cornell University's Johnson Museum. The sculpture comprises a large vertical stainless steel disc connected to a triangular panel of steel with a stepped outer edge painted orange, green, blue, and yellow. That same year, he met the French poet Léon-Gontran Damas, a founder of the Négritude intellectual movement, at a party that Cortez hosted for Damas in her apartment. Damas became a friend and mentor to the younger artist, often visiting New York, where Edwards would drive him around for his meetings and appointments; Edwards and Cortez also traveled to Washington, D.C., to see Damas and his wife.

=== 1970s: Whitney exhibition, Rockers, travel to Africa ===
Edwards was invited to show his work in the survey exhibition Afro-American Artists at the Museum of Fine Arts, Boston, in early 1970 but declined to participate. He said that the curator of the exhibition, Edmund Gaither, had asked him "You'd object to being in a black show?", to which Edwards replied: "No, white artists don't object to being in white shows." Bowling was also invited to contribute work for the exhibition and titled his submission, a painting from 1968, as Mel Edwards Decides in reference to Edwards's decision-making process in regards to participating in the show or not.

Installation view of Edwards's solo exhibition at the Whitney Museum in 1970. At left: "look through minds mirror distance and measure time" – Jayne Cortez; at right: Curtain for William and Peter.

In March 1970, Edwards staged a solo exhibition, Melvin Edwards: Works, at New York's Whitney Museum, curated by Robert M. Doty; Edwards was the first African-American sculptor (Note: Although Edwards was the first African-American sculptor to receive a solo exhibition at the Whitney, painter Al Loving was the first African-American artist overall, having staged a solo show at the museum in 1969.) to receive a solo show in the museum's history. Doty had originally expected Edwards to show his Lynch Fragments sculptures, but Edwards had stopped making new works in the series after moving to New York. Edwards said that Doty "reluctantly went along" with his choice to install several barbed-wire installations, including two new works: Corner for Ana, a set of horizontal barbed wires creating a triangle form in a corner, named for the artist's daughter; and "look through minds mirror distance and measure time" – Jayne Cortez, a tunnel-like installation named for a poem by Cortez. Additionally, he recreated Pyramid Up and Down Pyramid and Curtain for William and Peter for the show. The only immediate review of the exhibition - by Robert Pincus-Witten in Artforum - was negative, but Bowling published a defense of the show in ARTnews the following year. Artist David Hammons saw the exhibition and said it influenced his work.

Edwards's sketch for Homage to Coco (1970), featured in the catalogue for the Whitney Museum's annual sculpture exhibition.

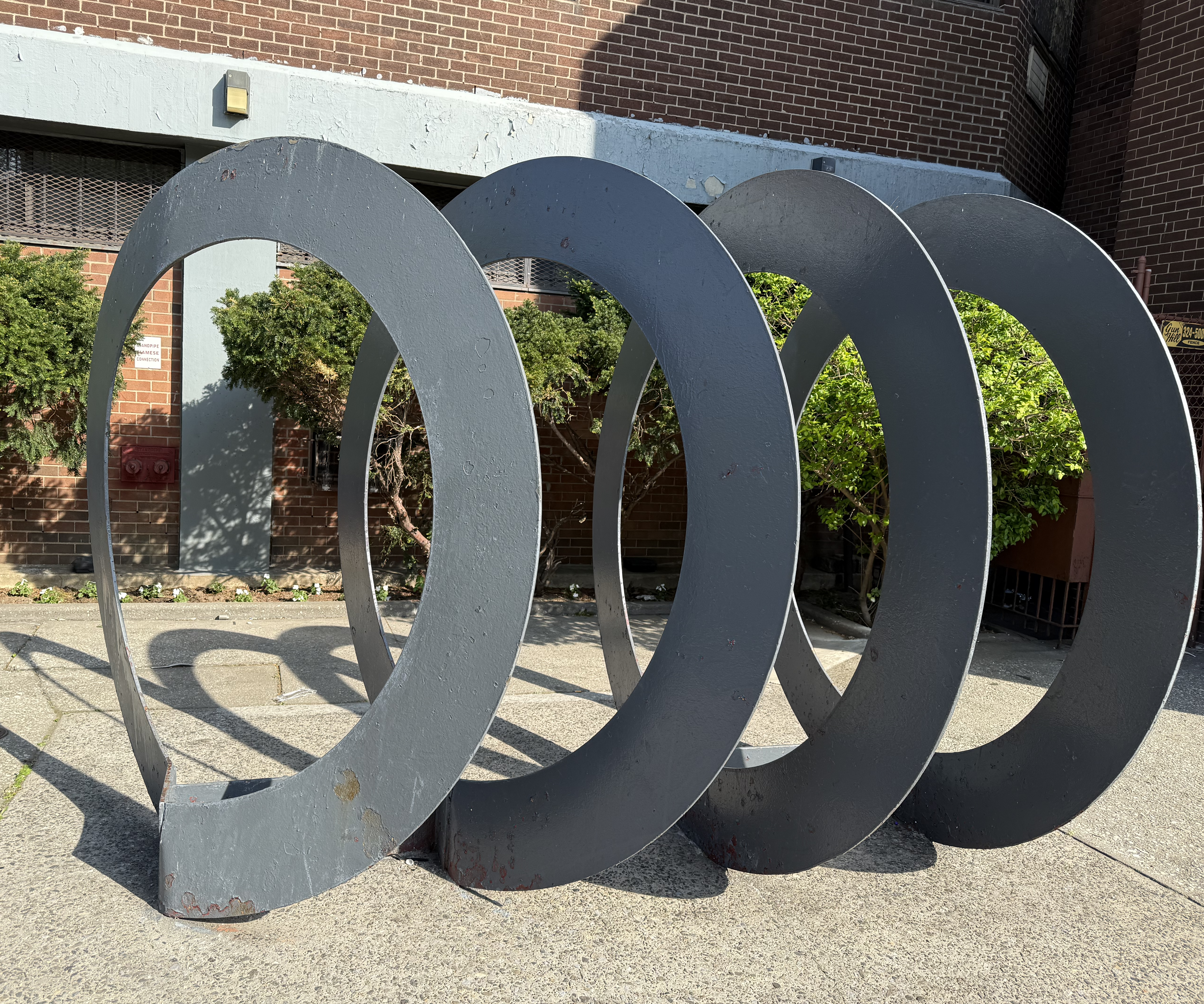
Double Circles (1970), Edwards's second public art commission, on view in Harlem.

In 1970, Edwards also began work on his Rockers series, kinetic sculptures built on large half-circles of metal that can rock back and forth. Edwards said the series was inspired by his grandmother Coco's rocking chair; Edwards had injured himself on the chair as a child, holding onto the memory into adulthood. Edwards used the term "syncopate" to describe the interaction while rocking, and the similarities between syncopation in African-American music and the movement in these sculptures; he extensively cited jazz music as an influence on his work. The first work in the series, Homage to Coco, completed in 1970, comprised two painted half-circles of steel connected by crossbars, with a series of steel chains running between the forms that swung as the work rocked. He originally sketched the work to include barbed wire instead of chains but executed the change after receiving the components from his fabricator. Homage to Coco was first shown at the Whitney Museum's annual sculpture exhibition several months after Edwards's solo exhibition at the museum. The same year, he installed his second public sculpture commission, Double Circles, (Note: Double Circles was installed on the sidewalk directly outside the apartment complex. At some point in the 1970s, the work was painted red by an unknown party, possibly to cover graffiti that had accumulated on the sculpture, but it was eventually painted gray, similar to its original color. The work was also struck by a truck and several of the circular forms were bent inward by the collision. As of 2015, the sculpture was still installed outside the apartment building.) outside Bethune Towers, an apartment complex in Harlem. The sculpture, comprising a series of large vertical steel circles with empty centers large enough to walk through, was described by curator Mary Schmidt Campbell as "distinctly recreational in feeling". Comparing Double Circles to Edwards's previous commission at Cornell, Homage to My Father and the Spirit, artist Rudolf Baranik argued that "Edwards knew to whom he was speaking: the title for the Cornell piece was both a reminder and a warning [...] while to the Black children of the crowded Bethune Towers he gave a gift of play."

In 1970, Edwards was also appointed to an assistant professorship at the University of Connecticut. That summer, he took his first trip to Africa, visiting the West African republics of Nigeria, Togo, Benin, and Ghana. He traveled with the program "Educators to Africa", accompanied by Cortez and a group composed mostly of African-American teachers. After his first trip in 1970, he traveled with Cortez to different parts of Africa many times throughout the coming decades, saying in 1987: "I go every chance I get – I've probably been back to Africa more times since 1970 than I've been to Texas." He spoke extensively about the influence of his time in Africa on his work, noting in particular his experiences in the early 1970s in the Nigerian city of Ibadan. Edwards found a large creative community in Ibadan, meeting and becoming friends with the artist Demas Nwoko and writer Lindsay Barrett. While in Nigeria's Benin City, Edwards was trained in bronze casting by Chief Moregbe Inneh, a leader of the city's bronze casters.

Edwards's work was set to be included in the Whitney Museum's exhibition Contemporary Black Artists in America in 1971, but he withdrew his work in protest – along with 24 other black artists – after the Whitney refused to hire a black curator for the show and the Black Emergency Cultural Coalition called for a boycott of the exhibition. The curator of the exhibition, Doty, originally asked Edwards to write an essay for the show's catalogue but rejected Edwards's submission, which primarily focused on the art world's failure to support African-American artists. After withdrawing from the show, Edwards published a statement in Artforum, co-signed by Williams, Gilliam, Johnson, Hunt, and others, that condemned the Whitney's exhibition and their view of the art world's treatment of black artists. Edwards also returned to Nigeria for a trip in 1971.

In 1972, he accepted a position as an assistant professor at Rutgers University's Livingston College. The same year, Edwards, Gilliam, and Williams mounted a three-person exhibition at the School of the Art Institute of Chicago organized by the artist Emilio Cruz, titled Interconnections. The works in the exhibition included Good Friends in Chicago, a double-tiered Rockers work featuring two stacked rocking metal forms. Edwards said the title "refers to the fact that when we went out there to do a show, there was no money to ship stuff out", and he used Hunt's studio to make the work after arriving in the city, "So the piece was an homage to our friendship."

As an undergraduate, Edwards studied printmaking techniques but had largely stopped working in the medium after university; in 1973, he was encouraged to start making prints again by printmaker Robert Blackburn, and he made several works in Blackburn's Printmaking Workshop in New York's East Village. He traveled to Nigeria again the same year. Also in 1973, Edwards briefly returned to making Lynch Fragments sculptures, spurred by pro-segregationist protests in parts of New York and attacks on black people in his neighborhood, although he ceased making new works for the series by the end of the year. He did show them in several exhibitions over the following years; in 1974, he exhibited multiple new works from the series in a three-person show with Gilliam and Williams, Extensions, at the Wadsworth Atheneum in Hartford, Connecticut. Edwards and Cortez married in 1975.

Edwards staged another three-person exhibition with Gilliam and Williams in 1976, Resonance, at Morgan State University in Baltimore. He showed several works with titles that referenced his travels to and study of Africa, including Angola 1973 and Luanda 1975. Edwards participated in FESTAC (the Second World Black and African Festival of Arts and Culture) in Lagos in 1977. He traveled with Cortez to Nigeria for the event and they stayed together with all the other participants in the same residential complex, allowing them to meet and engage with a large number of artists from the African diaspora, an experience Edwards said was "more than exciting – it was important." Several artists whom he met at the festival became lifelong friends and colleagues, including Mozambican painter Malangatana Ngwenya.

The Studio Museum in Harlem hosted Edwards's first retrospective exhibition in 1978, which included a set of his Lynch Fragments sculptures, works from his Rockers series, and a multi-part steel work dedicated to Damas, who died the same year. Damas had asked Edwards to create a work for his home but died before Edwards could begin work on it; the artist exhibited it in partial form at the Studio Museum and finished it over the ensuing three years. The sculpture, Homage to the Poet Léon Gontran Damas, comprises a vertical semi-circular steel form, steel panels and shapes leaned against one another, and a bench-like form encircled by a metal chain on the ground, all oriented facing east toward Africa. The retrospective received very little critical attention; Schmidt Campbell, the director of the museum, said: "It was like nothing, like the show didn't happen... It was scary." The exhibition offered Edwards the opportunity to see several Lynch Fragments sculptures together after several years, inspiring him to restart the series and continue creating new works throughout his career.

In 1978, he also began serving as the American editor of Nwoko's art-focused journal New Culture, writing extensively about African-American art for a Nigerian audience and publishing images of his own sculptures and illustrations.

=== 1980s: Public sculpture, international travel, critical lull ===
In 1980, Edwards became a full professor at the Mason Gross School of the Arts at Rutgers. The same year, he traveled to Egypt for the first time, as well as to Kenya, Gambia, and France. In 1981, he went with Cortez to Cuba on a trip organized by the artist Ana Mendieta that also included curator Lucy Lippard, giving a lecture to the Casa de las Américas about African-American art and meeting several well-known Cuban artists, including Wifredo Lam. Edwards made a sculpture in Lam's memory upon his death in 1982. He also reconnected with the Cuban artist Gilberto de la Nuez, whom he had first met at a FESTAC-sponsored exhibition.

Also in 1982, Edwards completed a sculpture for a public-housing complex in Columbus, Ohio, commissioned by the Greater Columbus Arts Council. The work, titled Out of the Struggles of the Past to a Brilliant Future, comprises a series of steel half-discs and geometric forms that create an archway, supported in part by a large column-like section of oversized, vertical chain made from steel. This work marked Edwards's first use of the chain motif in his freestanding sculpture, as opposed to using actual metal chains as in his smaller works. After the sculpture in Ohio, he was commissioned several times in the 1980s for public works, including a sculpture at Winston-Salem State University in North Carolina and three sculptures in various cities in New Jersey. He mounted a two-decade survey of his sculptures at the Maison de l'UNESCO in Paris in 1984. He showed a large number of newer Lynch Fragments sculptures, including the newest, At Cross Roads, made that year, which contained a metal vise etched with a company logo and a Made in USA marking, among other materials.

Edwards traveled extensively throughout the decade, visiting Nicaragua and France in 1984; Ivory Coast in 1985, in addition to Nigeria, where he returned to Benin City and gifted a Lynch Fragment sculpture to Erediauwa, the Oba of Benin; Zimbabwe in 1986, the first of several trips; and Gabon and Brazil in 1987. In 1988, he made a Lynch Fragment work inspired by his time in Brazil with Cortez, Palmares, created to mark the 100-year anniversary of the abolition of slavery in the country; he had initially visited the country with Cortez to accompany her to a poetry event. Also in 1988, Edwards was awarded a Fulbright Fellowship to Zimbabwe, traveling to the country two summers in a row. While in Zimbabwe on his Fulbright in 1988 and 1989, Edwards taught several workshops in metalworking and sculpture to local community members and created a new body of Lynch Fragments sculptures, the largest of the series up to that point.

He continued to produce new work in the 1980s, but his career in New York faltered somewhat, with fewer exhibitions or high-profile commissions in the city. Curator Lowery Stokes Sims, a supporter of Edwards's work, attributed this to both the artist's choice to pursue abstract art as a black artist at a time when figurative art was considered by some to hold more political value, and to the subject matter of his Lynch Fragments sculptures, which Sims said was "tough stuff for the art world to take in". In 1988, critic Michael Brenson called Edwards "one of the best American sculptors", as well as "one of the least known". The following year, Brenson profiled Edwards and several other black artists in The New York Times, writing that, despite a broad array of awards, exhibitions, and commissions across the country, Edwards "remains largely unknown".

In 1989, Edwards completed an outdoor sculpture commission at the Social Security Administration building in Queens, New York, as part of the GSA's federal Art in Architecture program, one of seven commissions by African-American artists for the building. His sculpture Confirmation, installed in a public plaza in front of the building, was made with a series of large stainless-steel geometric forms, including a disc, a triangle, and an arch.

=== 1990s: First commercial show, 30-year retrospective ===
Edwards continued making Lynch Fragments sculptures throughout the 1980s, exhibiting many of them in a ten-year survey of his work at Montclair State College in 1990. He also opened his first ever solo commercial gallery exhibition in 1990 at CDS Gallery in New York, exhibiting seventeen Lynch Fragments sculptures and a large freestanding stainless-steel work, To Listen, comprising several tall door-like elements with an oversized length of chain running up the side of the piece. Sculptures from the exhibition were purchased by a number of museums, including the Brooklyn Museum, Bronx Museum of the Arts, and MoMA. The owner of the gallery, Clara Diament Sujo, told ARTnews that it was somewhat difficult to sell Edwards's Lynch Fragments sculptures to private collectors despite a large number of museum acquisitions. Speaking in 1990 about his lack of commercial success in the immediate years following his Whitney Museum exhibition, Edwards said: "I certainly thought that around the time when I did my show at the Whitney [...] something else significant should have happened. But when it didn't, I just kept on working."

In 1993, Edwards staged a 30-year retrospective exhibition at the Neuberger Museum of Art (Note: After closing in New York, the retrospective traveled to the Hood Museum of Art in New Hampshire, the Art Museum at Florida International University in Miami, and the McNay Art Museum in San Antonio.) in Purchase, New York. Reviewing the exhibition for The New York Times, critic Michael Kimmelman wrote that Edwards "conformed to the canons of neither figuration nor formalist abstraction, which may partly explain why his art tended to fall between art world stools and why [...] he has had to wait so long for a museum to give him such serious attention." The same year, Edwards was invited to present work at the first Fujisankei Biennale Sculpture Competition in Japan, exhibiting Asafo Kra No, a large outdoor painted-steel work with a chain and a rocking element; the sculpture won the grand prize of the competition and was permanently installed at the Utsukushi-ga-hara Open-Air Museum in Nagano.

Edwards traveled to Senegal in 1996 to take part in the first artist residence at the Goree Institute's Print Workshop. He developed a print portfolio during the residence with the artists Souleymane Keïta and Breyten Breytenbach.

=== 2000s: Time in Senegal, retirement from teaching ===
With assistance from Keïta, Edwards and Cortez began living part-time in Dakar in 2000, and Edwards secured studio space to make work there. Living in Senegal, he began to create new works similar in style to his Lynch Fragments sculptures, but with the addition of metal drainage covers commonly used in the region, onto which he mounted the assemblage forms. He and Cortez purchased a larger property in upstate New York around the same time. Also in 2000, Edwards mounted a survey of his works in printmaking at the Jersey City Museum, showcasing a range of his printed works along with drawings, notebooks, and several small sculptures.

Edwards retired from his long-time position teaching at Rutgers University in 2002, and moved the majority of his larger sculptures from New Jersey to storage in New York, although he kept his studio in New Jersey active. He maintained art studios in Accord, New York, Plainfield, New Jersey, and Dakar.

In 2004 and 2005, Edwards was artist-in-residence at Lafayette College with the Experimental Printmaking Institute. In 2006, his work was included in the survey show Energy/Experimentation: Black Artists and Abstraction, 1964–1980 at the Studio Museum in Harlem, organized by Kellie Jones. The show aimed to recontextualize the work of black artists such as Edwards whose abstract art had been rejected and labeled regressive by contemporaneous black critics.

In 2008, he completed Transcendence, a monumental sculpture commissioned for the campus of Lafayette College in Easton, Pennsylvania. The work, made of a series of stainless-steel geometric forms and chain links stacked atop one another, is dedicated to the self-emancipated 19th-century ophthalmologist David K. McDonogh, who had been sent to Lafayette by his enslaver in 1838 to be educated for a missionary voyage to Liberia but had refused to be sent to Africa, instead becoming in 1844 the college's first black graduate, and starting a long medical career in New York.

=== 2010s: 50-year retrospective, Venice Biennale ===
In the fall of 2010, Edwards staged an exhibition of new and historical works at the gallery Alexander Gray Associates in New York, showing multiple newer Lynch Fragments sculptures with titles referencing contemporary events, including the Iraq War. He also exhibited a number of older works, such as Chaino (1970). Several critics positively reviewed the exhibition, among them Roberta Smith, writing in The New York Times, who said that the exhibition showed "the quiet, undiminished integrity of Mr. Edwards's art". Several of Edwards's Lynch Fragments sculptures were exhibited in Los Angeles in the Hammer Museum's (Note: After closing in Los Angeles, the exhibition traveled to MoMA PS1 in New York.) exhibition Now Dig This! Art and Black Los Angeles 1960-1980 in fall 2011. Edwards's inclusion in the exhibition led to an increase in critical reappraisals of his oeuvre and a new awareness of his work among a younger group of curators. In June 2012, he restaged his barbed-wire sculpture Pyramid Up and Down Pyramid at the Art Basel art fair for Gray's gallery. Cortez died from heart failure in 2012 at the age of 78.

In 2014, Edwards presented his first solo exhibition in the United Kingdom at Stephen Friedman Gallery in London, featuring his sculptures, drawings, and a site-specific installation. Assessing the show for ArtReview, critic Chris Fite-Wassilak stated: "Renewed interest in Edwards's work is timely, given the parallels between the struggles of the 1960s and the current unrest in the US, and while his approach hasn't changed, neither have the problems he sought to address."

The Nasher Sculpture Center in Dallas opened a 50-year retrospective of Edwards's work in January 2015, (Note: After closing in Texas, the retrospective traveled to the Zimmerli Art Museum at Rutgers University in New Jersey and the Columbus Museum of Art in Ohio.) comprising work from every era of his career. One gallery in the exhibition included a complete reinstallation of the artist's barbed-wire sculptures from his 1970 Whitney Museum exhibition. The curator, Catherine Craft, said she became interested in working with Edwards on a show after seeing his works in Now Dig This. Edwards's work was included in the 56th Venice Biennale in May 2015, curated by Okwui Enwezor, the exhibition's first African curator. Enwezor installed a series of Edwards's Lynch Fragments sculptures in two rows on walls facing each other that visitors had to walk between. Edwards's inclusion in the Biennale led to another increase in critical attention on his career. Reviewing the exhibition in Artforum, critic and art historian Benjamin Buchloh said that "Seeing Edwards's work anew" illustrated "the egregious limitations of those definitions of modernist sculpture that excluded Edwards for so many years and deprived him of deserved recognition."

Edwards traveled to Oklahoma in 2016 for a month-long residency at the Oklahoma Contemporary, sourcing materials from local scrapyards to create new works, including several sculptures made with metal forms suspended in the air with chains. He showed many of these new pieces in 2017 at Gray's gallery in New York in his exhibition In Oklahoma. Also in 2017, Edwards mounted a solo exhibition at Brown University's David Winton Bell Gallery, showing historical works as well as several recently completed pieces. Among the new works was Corner for Ana (Scales of Injustice), an installation work featuring a scale holding metal detritus, hanging behind a barrier of barbed wire; Edwards said the work was inspired by the death of a Gambian migrant who drowned in Venice's Grand Canal while onlookers filmed the incident instead of assisting. In March 2017, Edwards and curator Diala Touré spoke to students at Baltimore School for the Arts about the portrayal of the African diaspora in art. That same year, several sculptures by Edwards were included in the historical survey exhibition Soul of a Nation: Art in the Age of Black Power at the Tate Modern (Note: After closing in London, the exhibition traveled to the Crystal Bridges Museum of American Art in Bentonville, Arkansas, the Brooklyn Museum in New York, The Broad in Los Angeles, the de Young Museum in San Francisco, and the Museum of Fine Arts, Houston.) in London, curated by Mark Godfrey and Zoé Whitley. The show, acclaimed by ARTnews as one of the most important exhibitions of the decade, featured several of Edwards's works, including his barbed-wire sculpture Curtain for William and Peter (1969/1970) and Some Bright Morning (1963), the first of his Lynch Fragments sculptures, along with others from the series. Edwards also moved to Baltimore in 2017 and married Diala Touré.

In 2018, the São Paulo Museum of Art (MASP) hosted a survey of Edwards's Lynch Fragments sculptures, the most comprehensive exhibition of the series ever. The following year, Edwards returned to Brazil for a residency and exhibition at the art space Auroras in São Paulo; despite only being in Brazil for two weeks, he created a sizable body of new work, including the room-sized installation piece Continuous Resistance Room, the barbed-wire installation Curtain Calls, and six new Lynch Fragments works. After being shown at Auroras in 2019, the exhibition of new works traveled to the Museu da República in Rio de Janeiro and the Museum of Modern Art of Bahia. Also in 2019, Edwards staged Crossroads, a solo exhibition at the Baltimore Museum of Art. (Note: After closing in Maryland, the exhibition traveled to the Ogden Museum of Southern Art in New Orleans.)

Throughout the 2010s, a large number of museums and arts institutions purchased Edwards's work as critical interest in his career grew along with an increase in his museum exhibitions. Speaking in 2019 about this new attention, he said: "Some is serious, some is fickle and some is not at all positive — you just have to find your way through it." He also began experimenting with creating tapestries during this period.

=== 2020s: Public sculpture survey, European retrospective ===
In 2021, the Public Art Fund organized Melvin Edwards: Brighter Days – a survey of Edwards's outdoor sculptures, spanning 1970 to 2020 – in New York's City Hall Park, (Note: After closing in New York, the exhibition traveled to the DeCordova Sculpture Park in Massachusetts.) curated by Daniel S. Palmer. The show included the first work from Edwards's Rockers series, Homage to Coco (1970), along with four additional historical works by Edwards; he also produced a new large-scale outdoor sculpture for the exhibition, Song of the Broken Chains, which comprised a series of oversized stainless-steel broken-chain links. Opened in May 2021, the exhibition had originally been scheduled for the previous year but was postponed by Edwards in solidarity with the Black Lives Matter protests being held at City Hall in 2020.

In April 2022, Edwards, Gilliam, and Williams staged their final three-artist exhibition together, Epistrophy, at Pace Gallery in New York; Gilliam died in June of that year. Also in 2022, the Dia Art Foundation opened a long-term installation at Dia Beacon of Edwards's barbed-wire sculptures from the late 1960s and early 1970s. The sculptures exhibited had never been executed before, only existing in sketch form. The same year, Edwards was the subject of a solo exhibition at the University of Texas at Austin titled Wire(d) and Chain(ed), where he exhibited a number of Lynch Fragments sculptures and works on paper.

In 2023, Edwards mounted a solo exhibition at Galerie Buchholz in Berlin titled B WIRE, BEWARE, ALL WAYS ART. He exhibited a number of sculptures and works on paper as well as Now's the Time (1970–2023), an installation work featuring a saxophone hung from the ceiling by a chain set behind a barrier of barbed-wire formed into a "V" shape. Also in 2023, Edwards completed the public sculpture David's Dream, commissioned by the David C. Driskell Center in honor of the center's namesake, African-American art historian and artist David Driskell. The sculpture, comprising several stainless-steel discs, geometric forms, and oversized lengths of chain, was permanently installed in front of the center on the University of Maryland, College Park's campus in 2024.

Edwards staged his first solo museum exhibition in Europe in 2024 at the Fridericianum in Kassel, Germany. The retrospective exhibition, Some Bright Morning, included a number of his Lynch Fragments sculptures, several large freestanding metal sculptures, and an array of drawings, prints, and paintings on paper from the 1970s and '80s. A version of the retrospective traveled in June 2025 to the Kunsthalle Bern in Bern, Switzerland, and in October 2025 to the Palais de Tokyo in Paris.

Edwards died at his home in Baltimore on March 30, 2026, aged 88. He was survived by his wife, Touré.

== Public art ==
Edwards completed a broad array of large-scale, public sculpture commissions. His public sculptures include: Homage to My Father and the Spirit (1969), installed at Cornell University's Appel Commons; Homage to Billie Holiday and the Young Ones of Soweto (1976–1977), installed at Morgan State University's James E. Lewis Museum of Art; Out of the Struggles of the Past to a Brilliant Future (1982), installed at Mt. Vernon Plaza apartment complex in Columbus, Ohio; Breaking of the Chains (1995), installed on San Diego harbor-front's Martin Luther King Jr. Promenade; Transcendence on the campus of Lafayette College in Easton, Pennsylvania; and David's Dream (2023), installed outside the David C. Driskell Center at the University of Maryland, College Park.

== Exhibitions ==
Edwards participated in a large number of solo shows in the United States and internationally. His notable solo shows include: Melvin Edwards (1965) at the Santa Barbara Museum of Art, his first solo museum exhibition; Melvin Edwards: Works (1970), his first solo museum exhibition in New York and the first solo show by an African-American sculptor at New York's Whitney Museum; Melvin Edwards (1990) at CDS Gallery in New York, his first solo commercial gallery exhibition; Melvin Edwards (2014–2015) at Stephen Friedman Gallery in London, his first solo exhibition in the UK; and Melvin Edwards (2022), a long-term installation of previously unrealized sculptural installations at Dia Beacon.

He staged numerous museum retrospective exhibitions, including: Melvin Edwards: Sculptor (1978), his first retrospective exhibition, a small show at the Studio Museum in Harlem; a 30-year traveling retrospective in 1993, originating at the Neuberger Museum of Art in Purchase, New York; a 50-year traveling retrospective in 2015, originating at the Nasher Sculpture Center in Dallas; and Some Bright Morning (2024–2025), his first traveling retrospective in Europe, originating at the Fridericianum in Kassel, Germany.

Edwards also participated in many group exhibitions, including the 56th Venice Biennale (2015) and the Havana Biennial (2019). His sculpture The Lifted X was featured by MoMA in the museum's long-running fourth-floor installation Divided States of America, in which it was described by curators Esther Adler and Christophe Cherix as "a key work".

== Awards and honors ==
Edwards was awarded a wide range of grants and fellowships, including National Endowment for the Arts (NEA) fellowships in 1971 and 1984, a Guggenheim Fellowship in 1975, and a Fulbright Fellowship to Zimbabwe in 1988.

He was elected into the National Academy of Design as an Associate in 1992, and became a full Academician in 1994. He received honorary degrees from the Massachusetts College of Art and Design and Brooklyn College.

Edwards received the Lifetime Achievement Award from the International Sculpture Center in 2024.

== Notable works in public collections ==
- Chaino (1964), Williams College Museum of Art, Williamstown, Massachusetts
- August the Squared Fire (1965), San Francisco Museum of Modern Art
- The Lifted X (1965), Museum of Modern Art, New York
- Curtain for William and Peter (1969/1970), Tate, London
- Pyramid Up and Down Pyramid (1969/1970), Whitney Museum, New York
- Gate of Ogun (1983), Neuberger Museum of Art, Purchase, New York
- Justice for Tropic-Ana (dedicated to Ana Mendieta) (1986), from the series Lynch Fragments, Carnegie Museum of Art, Pittsburgh
- Good Word from Cayenne (1990), from the series Lynch Fragments, Museum of Fine Arts, Houston
- Off and Gone (1992), from the series Lynch Fragments, Museum of Contemporary Art Chicago
- Tambo (1993), Smithsonian American Art Museum, Washington, D.C.
- Siempre Gilberto de la Nuez (1994), from the series Lynch Fragments, National Gallery of Art, Washington, D.C.
- Soba (2002), from the series Lynch Fragments, Detroit Institute of Arts
- Scales of Injustice (2017/year of exhibition), Baltimore Museum of Art

== Publications ==
=== Writing ===
- Edwards, Melvin (1970). "Artist's statement". Melvin Edwards: Works (PDF) (Exhibition pamphlet). New York: Whitney Museum. pp. Unpaginated. OCLC 79107597 – via Internet Archive.
- — (1974). "Artist's statement". Gilliam / Edwards / Williams: Extensions (Exhibition pamphlet). Hartford, Connecticut: Wadsworth Atheneum. p. 27. OCLC 67547179.
- — (1981). "Artist's statement". Melvin Edwards – Gregory Edwards (PDF) (Exhibition pamphlet). University Gallery, State University of New York at Binghamton. pp. Unpaginated. OCLC 741518976. Archived from the original (PDF) on February 2, 2025.
- — (Fall 1992) [First published 1982, in Buhle, Paul, et al (eds.), Free Spirits: Annals of the Insurgent Imagination, San Francisco: City Lights Books.]. "Lynch Fragments". Sulfur. No. 31. pp. 30–32. OCLC 7587450. ProQuest 878741934.
- — (1994). "Statement". Fragments: Sculpture and Drawings from the 'Lynch Fragment' Series. Poetry by Jayne Cortez. New York: Bola Press. p. 4. ISBN 9780960806270. OCLC 31435239.
- — (Summer–Fall 2001). "Statement from Melvin Edwards". Black Renaissance/Renaissance Noire. Vol. 3, no. 3. p. 160. OCLC 34971120. Gale A81826818.
- — (2014). "Artist's statement". Melvin Edwards (Exhibition pamphlet). Transcribed and annotated by Wolff, Rebecca. New York: Alexander Gray Associates. pp. 3–7. ISBN 9780989740876. OCLC 897831096 – via Thomas J. Watson Library.
- — (2019) [Dated 1971. First published 1978, in Melvin Edwards: Sculptor, New York: Studio Museum in Harlem.]. "Notes on Black Art". Melvin Edwards: Painted Sculpture (Exhibition pamphlet). New York: Alexander Gray Associates. pp. 14–16. OCLC 1232485775 – via Thomas J. Watson Library.
- — (January–February 2020). "Object Lessons: Melvin Edwards". Sculpture. Vol. 39, no. 1. p. 104. OCLC 14039712. EBSCOhost 140286733.

=== Illustrations ===
- Cortez, Jayne (1969). Pissstained Stairs and the Monkey Man's Wares. Illustrations by Melvin Edwards. New York: Phrase Text. OCLC 119044.
- Cortez, Jayne (1971). Festivals and Funerals. Illustrations by Melvin Edwards. New York: Phrase Text. OCLC 1303321.
- Cortez, Jayne (1973). Scarifications. Illustrations by Melvin Edwards (1st ed.). New York: Bola Press. OCLC 433866507.
- Cortez, Jayne (1977). Mouth on Paper. Illustrations by Melvin Edwards. New York: Bola Press. ISBN 978-0-686-23312-1.
- Cortez, Jayne (1982). Firespitter. Illustrations by Melvin Edwards. New York: Bola Press. ISBN 978-0-9608062-5-6. OCLC 11263189.
- Cortez, Jayne (2025). Busby, Margaret (ed.). Firespitter: The Collected Poems of Jayne Cortez. Illustrations by Melvin Edwards. New York: Nightboat Books. ISBN 9781643622323.

== See also ==
- Abstract art by African-American artists
- List of African-American visual artists

== Notes, citations, and references ==
=== Cited references ===
- Aranke, Sampada (Winter 2020). "Blackouts and Other Visual Escapes". Art Journal. 79 (4). New York: College Art Association; Routledge: 62–75. doi:10.1080/00043249.2020.1779548. OCLC 1514294. EBSCOhost 147858045.
- Arnold, Leigh A. (2015). "Catalogue of Public Sculptures". In Craft, Catherine (ed.). Melvin Edwards: Five Decades. Dallas: Nasher Sculpture Center. pp. 180–189. ISBN 9780991233830. OCLC 904049795.
- Baranik, Rudolf (November–December 1985). "The Steel Won't Be So Heavy". Art Papers. Vol. 9, no. 6. pp. 20–23. OCLC 7219444. EBSCOhost 51309978.
- Binstock, Jonathan P., ed. (2005). "Discarding the Frame". Sam Gilliam: A Retrospective. Washington, D.C.; Berkeley, California: Corcoran Gallery of Art; University of California Press. pp. 43–81. ISBN 9780520246454. OCLC 58594996.
- Booker, Eric, ed. (2022). "Smokehouse: Abstract Potential". Smokehouse Associates. New York; New Haven, Connecticut: Studio Museum in Harlem; Yale University Press. pp. 7–38. ISBN 9780300267204. OCLC 1309868119.
- Booker, Eric; Hines, Noa; Hopson, Habiba; Taboada, Lilia Rocio; Whiteford, Meg (2022). "Chronology 1962–78". In Booker, Eric (ed.). Smokehouse Associates. New York; New Haven, Connecticut: Studio Museum in Harlem; Yale University Press. pp. 195–224. ISBN 9780300267204. OCLC 1309868119.
- Bowling, Frank (July 21, 2017) [First published April 1971, in ARTnews, vol. 77, no. 4.]. "From the Archives: Frank Bowling on Why It's Not Enough to Say 'Black Is Beautiful,' in 1971". ARTnews. Introduction by Greenberger, Alex. OCLC 2392716. Archived from the original on November 1, 2023.
- Brenson, Michael (March 12, 1989). "ART VIEW; Black Artists: A Place in the Sun". The New York Times. sec. 2, p. 1. OCLC 1645522. Archived from the original on August 7, 2023.
- Brenson, Michael (1993). "Lynch Fragments". In Gedeon, Lucinda H. (ed.). Melvin Edwards Sculpture: A Thirty-Year Retrospective, 1963–1993. Purchase, New York; Seattle: Neuberger Museum of Art; University of Washington Press. pp. 20–33. ISBN 9780295973005. OCLC 28161746.
- Brenson, Michael (May–June 2024). "Melvin Edwards: 'You don't play around with that power'". Sculpture. Vol. 43, no. 3. pp. 60–71. OCLC 14039712. EBSCOhost 176350774.
- Craft, Catherine, ed. (2015). Melvin Edwards: Five Decades. Dallas: Nasher Sculpture Center. ISBN 9780991233830. OCLC 904049795.
- Diederichsen, Diedrich (2024). "Für eine andere Abstraktion. Begegnungen mit Melvin Edwards" [For a Different Abstraction. Encounters with Melvin Edwards]. In Wesseler, Moritz (ed.). Melvin Edwards: Some Bright Morning (Exhibition pamphlet) (in German and English). Translated by Cahm, Claire. Kassel: Documenta; Fridericianum. pp. 2–21. OCLC 1466936749.
- Edwards, Melvin (1987). "Mel Edwards". International Review of African American Art (Interview). Vol. 7, no. 2, Art in Public Places. Interviewed by Hines, Watson. Hampton, Virginia: Hampton University Museum. pp. 34–51. OCLC 10955508.
- Edwards, Melvin (2015). "Conversations with Melvin Edwards". Melvin Edwards: Five Decades (Interview). Interviewed by Craft, Catherine. Dallas: Nasher Sculpture Center. Archived from the original on December 15, 2024.
- Edwards, Melvin; Williams, William T.; Gilliam, Sam; Dowell, John; Johnson, Daniel; Overstreet, Joe; Hunt, Richard (May 1971). "Politics". Artforum. Vol. 9, no. 9. p. 12. OCLC 20458258. Archived from the original on October 29, 2023.
- Gear, Josephine (1993). "Melvin Edwards' Freestanding Sculpture". In Gedeon, Lucinda H. (ed.). Melvin Edwards Sculpture: A Thirty-Year Retrospective, 1963–1993. Purchase, New York; Seattle: Neuberger Museum of Art; University of Washington Press. pp. 87–92. ISBN 9780295973005. OCLC 28161746.
- Godfrey, Mark (May 2015). "Melvin Edwards and Frank Bowling in Dallas". Artforum. Vol. 53, no. 9. OCLC 20458258. Archived from the original on September 1, 2024.
- Godfrey, Mark (2019). "Abstraction in Tryin' Times, 1967-1980". In Martin, Courtney J. (ed.). Four Generations: The Joyner/Giuffrida Collection of Abstract Art. New York: Gregory R. Miller & Co. pp. 93–109. ISBN 9781941366264. OCLC 1104920240.
- Gregg, Gail (February 1995). "Poetry in Heavy Metal" (PDF). ARTnews. Vol. 95, no. 2. pp. 104–107. OCLC 2392716. Archived (PDF) from the original on September 15, 2015.
- Hammons, David (2013) [First published Autumn 1986, in REALLIFE Magazine, no. 16.]. "Interview with David Hammons". In Katzeff, Miriam; Lawson, Thomas; Morgan, Susan (eds.). Real Life Magazine: Selected Writings and Projects 1979–1994 (Interview). Interviewed by Jones, Kellie. New York: Primary Information. p. 236. ISBN 9780978869700. OCLC 884923725.
- Irbouh, Hamid (2018) [First published 2000, in Ijele: Art eJournal of the African World, vol. 1, no. 2.]. "Melvin Edwards' Lynch Fragments: Negritude and the Battle for Civil Rights in America". In Pedrosa, Adriano; Moura, Rodrigo (eds.). Melvin Edwards: Lynch Fragments. São Paulo Museum of Art. pp. 30–42. ISBN 9788531000515. OCLC 1061526860.
- Jones, Kellie, ed. (2011). "Now Dig This! An Introduction". Now Dig This! Art & Black Los Angeles, 1960–1980. Los Angeles; New York: Hammer Museum; DelMonico Books. pp. 15–28. ISBN 9783791351360. OCLC 729342146.
- Kenny, Lynne (1993). "Chronology". In Gedeon, Lucinda H. (ed.). Melvin Edwards Sculpture: A Thirty-Year Retrospective, 1963–1993. Purchase, New York; Seattle: Neuberger Museum of Art; University of Washington Press. pp. 129–139. ISBN 9780295973005. OCLC 28161746.
- Marter, Joan (May 2016). "Melvin Edwards: Liberation and Remembrance". Sculpture. Vol. 35, no. 4. pp. 44–49. OCLC 14039712. EBSCOhost 114008450.
- Moura, Rodrigo (2018). "Lynch Fragments: Pieces of Life, Shards of History". In Pedrosa, Adriano; Moura, Rodrigo (eds.). Melvin Edwards: Lynch Fragments. Translated by Jojima, Tie. São Paulo Museum of Art. pp. 8–13. ISBN 9788531000515. OCLC 1061526860.
- Oren, Michel (Autumn 1990). "The Smokehouse Painters, 1968-70". Black American Literature Forum. 24 (3). Bloomington: Indiana University School of Education: 509–531. doi:10.2307/3041734. JSTOR 3041734. OCLC 2757016.
- Pincus-Witten, Robert (May 1970). "Melvin Edwards". Artforum. Vol. 8, no. 9. p. 77. OCLC 20458258. Archived from the original on November 20, 2023.
- Potts, Alex (2015). "Melvin Edwards' Sculptural Intensity". In Craft, Catherine (ed.). Melvin Edwards: Five Decades. Dallas: Nasher Sculpture Center. pp. 46–57. ISBN 9780991233830. OCLC 904049795.
- Schmidt Campbell, Mary (1978). "Introduction". Melvin Edwards, Sculptor. New York: Studio Museum in Harlem. pp. 3–10. OCLC 11879705.
- Siegel, Harmon (Spring 2020). "Melvin Edwards Decides". American Art. 34 (1). Washington, D.C.; Chicago: Smithsonian American Art Museum; University of Chicago Press: 86–111. doi:10.1086/709416. OCLC 24162804. EBSCOhost 142777467.
- Sims, Lowery Stokes (1993). "Melvin Edwards: An Artist's Life and Philosophy". In Gedeon, Lucinda H. (ed.). Melvin Edwards Sculpture: A Thirty-Year Retrospective, 1963–1993. Purchase, New York; Seattle: Neuberger Museum of Art; University of Washington Press. pp. 9–19. ISBN 9780295973005. OCLC 28161746.
- Wofford, Tobias (2015). "Reconsidering Black Internationalism". In Craft, Catherine (ed.). Melvin Edwards: Five Decades. Dallas: Nasher Sculpture Center. pp. 60–71. ISBN 9780991233830. OCLC 904049795.
- Wofford, Tobias (2024). "The Power of Sculpture and Politics of Recognition, 1960s to Now". In Lemmey, Karen; Wofford, Tobias; Yasumura, Grace (eds.). The Shape of Power: Stories of Race and American Sculpture. Washington, D.C.; Princeton, New Jersey: Smithsonian American Art Museum; Princeton University Press. pp. 99–139. ISBN 9780691261492. OCLC 1433093742.
- Wolff, Rebecca (2018). "'Nigeria Is Okay with Me!': Memory and History in Ibadan Oke (1992) and Ile Ogun (2003)". In Pedrosa, Adriano; Moura, Rodrigo (eds.). Melvin Edwards: Lynch Fragments. São Paulo Museum of Art. pp. 22–29. ISBN 9788531000515. OCLC 1061526860.
- Wolff, Rebecca (May 2022). "Assembling Pan-Africanism in Melvin Edward's Homage to the Poet Léon Gontran Damas". Nka: Journal of Contemporary African Art. No. 50. pp. 107–115. OCLC 30121303. Project MUSE 863367.
