= Melvin Edwards: Works =

American art exhibition featuring Melvin Edwards

- Front cover of the exhibition pamphlet published by the museum
- Date: 2–29 March 1970
- Venue: Whitney Museum, New York
- Curator: Robert M. Doty

Melvin Edwards: Works was a solo art exhibition by American sculptor Melvin Edwards shown at the Whitney Museum in New York in March 1970. The exhibition - the first solo show by an African-American sculptor at the Whitney - featured four abstract barbed wire and chain installation pieces created by Edwards.

The show received little and negative critical attention immediately following its run but was defended later by other critics and cited as an influential exhibition for other African-American abstract artists.

== Background ==
Melvin Edwards, an African-American artist primarily making abstract art, moved from Los Angeles to New York in January 1967. Edwards had first established himself as an artist on the west coast and was best known for his Lynch Fragments sculpture series.

Curator Robert M. Doty of New York's Whitney Museum was familiar with Edwards's Lynch Fragments series and invited him to present an exhibition at the museum. Doty originally expected Edwards to show his Lynch Fragments works - abstract sculptures that explicitly reference African-American history in their titles and materials - but Edwards had stopped making new works for that series after moving to New York. Edwards said that Doty "reluctantly went along" with his choice to install several of his recently developed, minimalist–inspired barbed wire installations instead. After living in a farmhouse north of the city for several months with a significant amount of barbed wire on the property, Edwards had begun to create sculptural environments of barbed wire and chains strung in various forms and geometric shapes.

At the time of the show, the Whitney had exhibited very few African-American artists in the museum; curator Catherine Craft has described Edwards's show as resulting "in part from the museum's efforts to make amends for largely excluding African Americans throughout its history." The exhibition was the first solo show by an African-American sculptor (Note: While Edwards was the first African-American sculptor to receive a solo exhibition at the Whitney, painter Al Loving was the first African-American artist overall, having staged a solo show at the museum in 1969.) in the Whitney's history. Edwards later withdrew in protest from an exhibition of art by African Americans curated by Doty at the Whitney after Doty rejected an essay Edwards wrote for the catalogue which focused on racial imbalances in the art world.

== Exhibition ==
Installation view of the exhibition. At left: "look through minds mirror distance and measure time" – Jayne Cortez; at right: Curtain for William and Peter.

Edwards exhibited two new barbed wire works in the exhibition: Corner for Ana, a set of horizontal barbed wires creating a triangle form in a corner, named for the artist's daughter; and "look through minds mirror distance and measure time" – Jayne Cortez, a tunnel-like installation of wire named for a poem by the artist's wife, Jayne Cortez. Additionally, he recreated two previous barbed wire and chain works: Pyramid Up and Down Pyramid, a set of alternating pyramidal forms stretching across two corners, and Curtain for William and Peter, a long curtain-like form of wire and chain named for the artists William T. Williams and Peter Bradley.

The show ran from March 2–29, 1970.

== Reception and legacy ==
The exhibition was negatively reviewed in Artforum by critic and art theorist Robert Pincus-Witten, who wrote that while "Edwards negotiates a supposed gap between geometric minimalism and anti-form", Pincus-Witten believed that "Robert Morris has already accomplished this". Pincus-Witten further disagreed with what he characterized as the museum's decision to "so obviously sponsor the career of a young artist", although Edwards had previously exhibited on the west coast.

The following year, artist and critic Frank Bowling published a defense of Edwards's show in ARTnews, saying that critics had overlooked the signified meanings and implied cultural references in the sculptures and their underlying materials, barbed wire and chain: "[Edwards] reroutes fashion and current art convention to 'signify' something different to someone who grew up in Watts rather than to 'signify' only in the meaning of Jack Burnham and his colleagues." Bowling argued that Edwards had hidden the social and political meanings of his art within coded references, an attribute Bowling described as "the traditional esthetic of black art", which he wrote "hinges on secrecy and disguise".

Art historian Tobias Wofford has argued that Edwards's show was also one of the targets of an essay by critic Amiri Baraka published the same year as Bowling's which claimed that successful black artists making abstract art – specifically those showing their work at the Whitney Museum – were turning away from their own communities by not making representational art. Baraka wrote that "The Richard Hunts and Barbara Chases & other less serious names touted as 'non-political' black artists do not actually exist in the black world at all. They are within the tradition of white art, blackface or not." At the time of the exhibition, some black artists, critics, and curators believed that abstract art was less relevant or important to black creatives and audiences than straightforwardly political or representative figurative art, preferring art of the era that served a distinct political purpose.

Although the only immediate review of the show - by Pincus-Whitten - was negative, artist David Hammons attended the exhibition and later said the barbed wire sculptures had inspired his own work: "That was the first abstract piece of art that I saw that had cultural value in it for black people." Edwards himself said in 2015 that the exhibition was "a reflection of the politics of the time. The Whitney was trying to figure out how to act like it was normal to have black artists show there, but of course it wasn't."

The entirety of the exhibition was recreated for Edwards's 50–year retrospective exhibition in 2015 originating at the Nasher Sculpture Center in Dallas.

== Notes, citations, and references ==
=== Cited references ===
- Baraka, Imamu Amiri (2021) [First published 1971.]. "Counter Statement to Whitney Ritz Bros". In Lloyd, Tom (ed.). Black Art Notes. New York: Primary Information. pp. 10–12. ISBN 9781734489750. OCLC 1197948448.
- Booker, Eric, ed. (2022). "Smokehouse: Abstract Potential". Smokehouse Associates. New York / New Haven, Connecticut: Studio Museum in Harlem / Yale University Press. pp. 7–38. ISBN 9780300267204. OCLC 1309868119.
- Bowling, Frank (21 July 2017) [First published April 1971, in ARTnews, vol. 77, no. 4.]. "From the Archives: Frank Bowling on Why It's Not Enough to Say 'Black Is Beautiful,' in 1971". ARTnews. Introduction by Greenberger, Alex. OCLC 2392716. Archived from the original on 1 November 2023.
- Craft, Catherine, ed. (2015). "This Life as a Sculptor". Melvin Edwards: Five Decades (Exhibition catalogue). Dallas: Nasher Sculpture Center. pp. 10–33. ISBN 9780991233830. OCLC 904049795.
- Edwards, Melvin (2015). "Conversations with Melvin Edwards". Melvin Edwards: Five Decades (Interview). Interviewed by Craft, Catherine. Dallas: Nasher Sculpture Center. Archived from the original on 15 December 2024.
- Godfrey, Mark (May 2015). "Melvin Edwards and Frank Bowling in Dallas". Artforum. Vol. 53, no. 9. OCLC 20458258. Archived from the original on 1 September 2024.
- Hammons, David (2013) [First published Autumn 1986, in REALLIFE Magazine, no. 16.]. "Interview with David Hammons". In Katzeff, Miriam; Lawson, Thomas; Morgan, Susan (eds.). Real Life Magazine: Selected Writings and Projects 1979–1994 (Interview). Interviewed by Jones, Kellie. New York: Primary Information. p. 236. ISBN 9780978869700. OCLC 884923725.
- Moura, Rodrigo (2018). "Lynch Fragments: Pieces of Life, Shards of History". In Pedrosa, Adriano; Moura, Rodrigo (eds.). Melvin Edwards: Lynch Fragments (Exhibition catalogue). Translated by Jojima, Tie. São Paulo Museum of Art. pp. 8–13. ISBN 9788531000515. OCLC 1061526860.
- Pincus-Witten, Robert (May 1970). "Melvin Edwards". Artforum. Vol. 8, no. 9. p. 77. OCLC 20458258. Archived from the original on 20 November 2023.
- Siegel, Harmon (Spring 2020). "Melvin Edwards Decides". American Art. 34 (1). University of Chicago Press: 86–111. doi:10.1086/709416. OCLC 24162804. EBSCOhost 142777467.
- Sims, Lowery Stokes (1993). "Melvin Edwards: An Artist's Life and Philosophy". In Gedeon, Lucinda H. (ed.). Melvin Edwards Sculpture: A Thirty-Year Retrospective, 1963–1993 (Exhibition catalogue). Purchase, New York / Seattle: Neuberger Museum of Art / University of Washington Press. pp. 9–19. ISBN 9780295973005. OCLC 28161746.
- Wofford, Tobias (2024). "The Power of Sculpture and Politics of Recognition, 1960s to Now". In Lemmey, Karen; Wofford, Tobias; Yasumura, Grace (eds.). The Shape of Power: Stories of Race and American Sculpture. Washington, D.C. / Princeton, New Jersey: Smithsonian American Art Museum / Princeton University Press. pp. 99–139. ISBN 9780691261492. OCLC 1433093742.
