= 2008 in art =

The year 2008 in art involved various significant events.

== Events ==
- A Fernand Léger painting Woman and Child (1921), which was at first on loan for an exhibit from the Davis Museum at Wellesley College in Wellesley, Massachusetts to the Oklahoma City Museum of Art while the Davis was closed for renovations, is later returned and then stored in a crate at Wellesley, but disappears in the intervening period; the work has not been seen since.
- May – Police seize photographs by Bill Henson from an upcoming exhibition at the Roslyn Oxley9 Gallery in Sydney, Australia, as potentially constituting child pornography.

== Exhibitions ==
- 20 February until 18 May – National Gallery, Pompeo Batoni
- 4 July until 14 September – "Robert Indiana a Milano" at the Padiglione d’Arte Contemporanea (Pavilion of Contemporary Art) in Milan, Italy

== Works ==
- Miquel Barceló - United Nations Ceiling in the Human Rights and Alliance of Civilizations Room of the United Nations Office at Geneva in Geneva, Switzerland.
- Mel Bochner – BLAH! BLAH! BLAH! (seminal work in the series)
- Christine Bourdette – Cairns, installation in Portland, Oregon
- Melvin Edwards - Transendence at Lafayette College in Easton, Pennsylvania, honor ing David Kearney McDonogh the college's first black graduate (1844).
- Gabriel Koren – Prudence Crandall with Student in the Connecticut State Capitol in Hartford, Connecticut
- Allison Saar - Harriet Tubman Memorial in Harlem, New York City (sculpture)
- Cindy Sherman – Untitled (chromogenic photographic print)
- Stan's Cafe – Of All The People In All The World, installation and performance
- Cy Twombly - Untitled I-IX
- La Danse de la fontaine émergente, fountain in Paris designed by Chen Zhen and completed by his widow Xu Min
- Monumento al perro callejero in Mexico City

== Films ==
- Séraphine

== Awards ==
- Archibald Prize – Del Kathryn Barton for "You are what is most beautiful about me", a self portrait with Kell and Arella
- Artes Mundi Prize – N. S. Harsha
- Caldecott Medal – Brian Selznick, The Invention of Hugo Cabret
- Hugo Boss Prize – Emily Jacir
- John Moores Painting Prize – Peter McDonald for "Fontana"
- Doug Moran National Portrait Prize – Fiona Lowry
- Rolf Schock Prize in Visual Arts – Mona Hatoum
- Turner Prize nominees – Runa Islam, Mark Leckey, Goshka Macuga and Cathy Wilkes.

== Deaths ==
=== January to March ===
- 1 January – Harold Corsini, American photographer and educator (born 1919)
- 3 January – Joan Gillchrest, British painter (born 1918)
- 9 February - Dorothy Podber, American performance artist (born 1932)
- 2 February – Roger Testu, French cartoonist (born 1913)
- 3 March – William Brice, American painter and teacher (born 1921)
- 11 March – Dave Stevens, American illustrator and comics artist (born 1955)
- 19 March – Hugo Claus, Belgian novelist, poet, playwright, painter and film director (born 1929)
- 28 March – Michael Podro, English art historian (born 1931)
- 29 March
  - Angus Fairhurst, Young British Artist, installation, photography and video artist (b. 1966)
  - Josef Mikl, Austrian abstract painter (born 1929)

=== April to June ===
- 3 April – Vladimír Preclík, Czech writer and sculptor (b.1929)
- 6 April – John Plumb, English painter (born 1927)
- 9 April – Burt Glinn, American photographer (born 1925)
- 14 April – Ollie Johnston, American animator (born 1912)
- 16 April – Joseph Solman, American painter (born 1909)
- 23 April – Paul Wonner, American painter (born 1920)
- 25 April – Enrico Donati, Italian-born American Surrealist painter and sculptor (born 1909)
- 12 May – Robert Rauschenberg, American artist (b.1925)
- 15 May
  - Will Elder, American illustrator and comic book artist (born 1921)
  - Flip Schulke, American photojournalist (born 1930)
- 18 May – Pietro Cascella, Italian painter and sculptor (born 1921)
- 21 May – Bartolomeu Cid dos Santos, Portuguese artist and professor (born 1931)
- 23 May – Cornell Capa, Hungarian-American photographer and photo curator (born 1918)
- 28 May – Beryl Cook, English painter (born 1926)
- 1 June
  - Alton Kelley, American poster and album artist (born 1940)
  - Yves Saint Laurent, French fashion designer (born 1936)
- 18 June – Tasha Tudor, American illustrator and author of children's books (born 1915)

=== July to December ===
- 7 July
  - Bruce Conner, American artist in film, drawing, sculpture, painting, collage and photography (born 1933)
  - Fred Yates, English artist (born 1922)
- 19 July – Dave Pearson, English painter (born 1937)
- 1 August – Pauline Baynes, English book illustrator (born 1922)
- 12 August – Michael Baxandall, Welsh art historian (born 1933)
- 18 August – Manny Farber, American painter and film critic (born 1917)
- 23 August – John Russell, British American art critic (born 1919)
- 3 September – Derek Davis, English painter and potter (born 1926)
- 4 September – Alain Jacquet, French abstract artist(born 1939)
- 12 September – Simon Hantaï, Hungarian abstr (born 1922)
- 1 October – Boris Efimov, Russian cartoonist and propaganda artist (born 1900)
- 7 October – Miles Richmond, English painter (born 1922)
- 11 October – William Claxton, American photographer (born 1927)
- 14 October – Ray Lowry, English cartoonist and illustrator (born 1944)
- 18 October – Gwyther Irwin, English abstract artist (born 1931)
- 15 November – Grace Hartigan, American Abstract Expressionist painter, (born 1922)
- 16 November – Jan Krugier, Polish born Swiss art dealer (born 1928)
- 17 November – Guy Peellaert, Belgian artist, painter, illustrator, comic artist and photographer (born 1934)
- 17 December – Willoughby Sharp, American author, curator, critic (born 1936)
- 27 December – Robert Graham, Mexican-American sculptor (born 1938)
- 29 December – Vladislav Lalicki, Serbian painter (born 1935)
