= Lynch Fragments =

Sculpture series by Melvin Edwards

- Afrophoenix No. 1 (1963), from the series Lynch Fragments, at the Art Institute of Chicago
- Artist: Melvin Edwards
- Year: 1963–1966; 1973; 1978–2026
- Medium: Metal

Lynch Fragments is a series of abstract metal sculptures created by American artist Melvin Edwards. He began the series in 1963 and continued it throughout his career, aside from two periods in the 1960s and 1970s. The sculptures number around 300 and are small, usually wall-based assemblages of metal scraps and objects such as spikes, chains, and scissors, welded together.

The title of the series alludes to the practice of lynching in the United States. Edwards, an African-American artist who grew up in both an integrated community in Ohio and a segregated community in Texas, described the works as metaphors for the violence inflicted on black people in the U.S. as well as the power and struggles of African Americans fighting against that violence. In their titles, many of the works explicitly reference African and African-American history, contemporary political events, and notable figures from Edwards's life and studies.

Some critics and art historians have observed sociocultural and historical allusions in the underlying objects and titles of the Lynch Fragments, while others have argued that the works are examples of formalist abstraction whose meanings are primarily visual rather than political. The pieces in the series are among Edwards's best-known and most widely lauded works.

== Background and history ==
=== 1963–1966: Early works, artistic and political background ===
Melvin Edwards (1937–2026), an African-American sculptor of abstract art, had been experimenting with welding small metal scraps for several years in the early 1960s while living in Los Angeles. In 1963, this experimentation resulted in a small relief sculpture that became the first work in his Lynch Fragments series. This sculpture, titled Some Bright Morning, comprises a shallow cylindrical form accented by bits of steel, a blade-shaped triangle of metal, and a short chain hanging from the piece with a small lump of steel at its end.

Some Bright Morning (1963), the first sculpture from the series

According to Edwards, inspirations for the series include David Smith's welded sculptures, the sculpture and painting of Julio González, and the work of Theodore Roszak. He was also inspired by the ways they communicated their social and political beliefs through their work, including in Smith's anti-fascist sculpture series Medals for Dishonor and González's sculpture La Montserrat depicting a peasant family. Edwards, however, wanted to move beyond their use of the human figure and communicate his beliefs through abstract imagery.

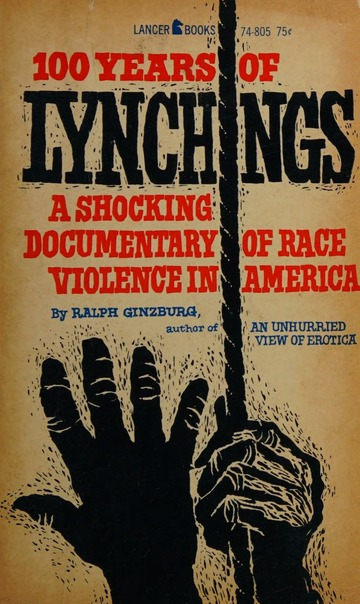
Top to bottom: The front cover of Muhammad Speaks from June 1962, featuring an image of Ronald Stokes after he was shot by police; and Ralph Ginzburg's anthology 100 Years of Lynchings, first published in 1962.

Edwards began the series during an increase in activity in the civil rights movement and in the midst of tensions in Los Angeles due to instances of police violence against black communities. The title of the series was chosen partly as a response to these developments, particularly the 1962 killing of Ronald Stokes, an unarmed black man shot dead by police in Watts while attempting to de-escalate a raid on the Nation of Islam mosque where he worked as secretary. Edwards saw a photograph of Stokes's body with scarring and stitches after an autopsy and said the image "sticks in my head". He had also recently read news reports and stories about contemporary and historical lynchings and instances of attempted anti-black violence, including in Ralph Ginzburg's anthology 100 Years of Lynchings, published in 1962. The title of Some Bright Morning alludes to an account in Ginzburg's anthology. Writing in 1982, Edwards described the narrative of the referenced story:

Some Bright Morning is a piece dedicated to a black family in Florida who had been warned by white people not to be so militant. The family continued to be militant until the white people said that some bright morning they were coming to get them, and when they came, the black people were armed and ready. They fought and then took to the swamp in guerilla warfare against those whites and they didn't lose.

— Melvin Edwards, "Lynch Fragments" (1982).

Edwards referenced this story several times as the source of the quote "some bright morning". The phrase actually originated in a different section of Ginzburg's book, the story of a farmer in Georgia who was lynched in 1919 after attempting to engage in labor organizing in his community.

Having grown up in urban communities in Dayton, Ohio, and Houston, Texas, protected from more violent civilian racism in rural areas, Edwards did not witness or have direct experiences with lynching in his early life. Explaining the meaning of the series' title as it relates to his own experiences, he said in 1993:

Basically, lynching didn't take place in a volatile city like Houston with its large black population. [...] I didn't think about lynching per se. Now what I thought about was police brutality. But you knew that when you got to rural places that kind of danger was possible. The title of the series is, in a sense, a metaphor for the whole struggle and the point that I took it had a lot to do with the fact that the level of struggle necessary to make things just had to be up to the level that it was unjust. My effort in sculpture had to be as intense as injustice, in the reverse.

— Melvin Edwards, quoted in Brenson, Michael, "Lynch Fragments" (1993).

While few of the works reference specific instances of lynching, Edwards chose the title to bring "that scale of intensity and that kind of power" to each work in the series. He also chose it because he did not want the sculptures to be viewed solely through the lens of formalist art discourse, the study of art purely through its visual attributes without social or political contextualization.

=== 1967–1978: Series paused, briefly restarted before full return ===
Edwards continued producing Lynch Fragments sculptures until January 1967, stopping when he relocated from Los Angeles to New York. In his words, "I felt I had gotten good esthetic mileage out of them that I wasn't getting as much out of the larger-scale pieces", and he turned his focus to works like his painted outdoor sculptures and installations of barbed wire and chain.

He resumed work on the series in 1973, largely as a response to pro-segregation demonstrations in New York and a rise in attacks on black people in his neighborhood, SoHo. He was also impelled to return by his anger over the Vietnam War and the high casualties suffered by African Americans. The Lynch Fragments works from 1973 are slightly larger than the earlier sculptures and extend further off the wall, and art historian Catherine Craft characterizes them as "more physically aggressive". By the end of the year, Edwards had stopped making the sculptures once again, as he felt that the repetitive format was limiting his other work.

In 1978, Edwards mounted a retrospective exhibition at the Studio Museum in Harlem which included sixteen Lynch Fragments sculptures, giving him the opportunity to view that many installed together in a gallery for the first time in several years and inspiring him to begin making new works for the series again. In addition, his new position teaching art at Rutgers University afforded him more stability and the funds for a larger studio, allowing him to experiment more with the series. Craft described Edwards's choice to resume work on the series as "motivated by creative rather than political urgency", although several sculptures from after 1978 do reference current or recent events in their titles, including the 1976 Soweto uprising and the Iraq War (2003–2011).

=== Post-1978: Full return to series, new global inspirations ===
After traveling to Africa for the first time in the early 1970s and continuing to visit different parts of the continent throughout the decade, Edwards began using various references to African history and politics as the titles for the works in the series, along with the names of artists and leaders whom he had met or been inspired by in Africa. He also began using phrases from African languages as titles for Lynch Fragments sculptures such as Koyo (1973), which takes its title from an Edo greeting, and Sekuru Knows (1988), titled in reference to a Shona word for "elder" or "grandfather". Further travels in Africa and throughout Latin America and Asia in the 1970s and 1980s inspired a range of titles relating to additional global histories, figures, and social movements, including Palmares (1988), created to honor the centennial of the abolition of slavery in Brazil. Specific figures named or referenced in the title of sculptures from the series include artists, musicians, activists, politicians, and writers such as Charles Alston, J. Max Bond Jr., Amílcar Cabral, critic Wilfred Cartey, Léon-Gontran Damas, Frantz Fanon, Makina Kameya, Martin Luther King Jr., Wifredo Lam, Norman Lewis, Al Loving, Samora Machel, Ana Mendieta, Senegalese blacksmith Bara Niasse, Gilberto de la Nuez, Charlie Parker, Francisco Romão, José Clemente Orozco, John Takawira, Henry Tayali, Ida B. Wells, and Richard Wright, as well as Edwards's late wife, Jayne Cortez. (Note: These names are primarily sourced from lists compiled by Michael Brenson and Catherine Craft. Additional individual names are sourced from essays and articles by Gail Gregg, Hamid Irbouh, Rodrigo Moura, and Raphael Rubinstein.) Edwards purposely decided not to name works in the series after any then-broadly known artists or figures of European descent.

After restarting the series in 1978, Edwards continued to produce new Lynch Fragments sculptures throughout his career. The series included more than 300 sculptures as of 2024. Edwards said he sometimes spent months, weeks, or years slowly adding elements to a work before considering it finished, a process he described as "organic", saying "It was like they grew rather than they were made". The pieces in the series are among Edwards's best-known and most celebrated, and have been cited by several authors as his breakthrough or signature works. (Note: The series has been cited as Edwards's breakthrough, signature, most celebrated, or most notable body of work by a range of writers, among them William Zimmer in The New York Times, Tim Keane in Hyperallergic, Nancy Gilson in The Columbus Dispatch, Frances Colpitt in CAA.reviews, Sampada Aranke in Art Journal, and Harmon Siegel in Artforum. Writing in 2024 in Sculpture magazine, critic Michael Brenson described the series as "now mythical".) Edwards himself spoke in 1993 about the importance of the series to his overall career, saying: "The Lynch Fragments have changed my life. They made this life of thirty years as a sculptor. They are the core to all the work. If anybody ever knows I lived, this is going to be why."

== Description and installation method ==
The sculptures are usually wall-based, although some works in the series are displayed on pedestals. Most of the works are small, generally around the size of a human head, and made of various metal scraps and implements welded onto a flat metal base mounted to the wall, usually circular, square, or triangular in shape. The materials Edwards welded onto the base sometimes protrude from or hang off of the sculptures and the works range visually from condensed, largely flat compositions to more sprawling sculptures with elements that extend further off the wall. Edwards used an array of metal objects and materials to create the sculptures, including whole or severed axes, barbed wire, bolts, car parts, chains, farm tools, gears, hammers, horseshoes, jacks, knives, nails, padlocks, rakes, scissors, shovels, spikes, and wrenches. Although the works are visually abstract apart from the identifiable objects used to create them, critics have compared them visually to skulls, gas masks, and traditional masks from across Africa, and several writers have noted that many of the constituent parts of the works resemble mouths, tongues, phalluses, and other body parts.

The works are normally installed at eye-level for Edwards, around six feet (1.8 m) high, which he called a "natural height". He described his ideal installation for exhibiting the sculptures, saying the works needed to be spaced three feet (0.91 m) apart, preferably installed in groups of multiples of sixteen, and ideally exhibited in a circular space. He developed this installation structure after his first solo museum exhibition in 1965 at the Santa Barbara Museum of Art; his Lynch Fragments sculptures in that exhibition were installed fairly haphazardly by museum staff without his input, leading him to think more deeply about a preferred installation technique.

== Reception and analysis ==
A range of critics, curators, and art historians have written in different terms about their experiences with and understanding of the series. In 2024, art critic Michael Brenson argued that Edwards "wants viewers to respond to them vividly, in ways that reveal their multiplicity, and we do." Michael Kimmelman observed in The New York Times that the sculptures had an "intense and concentrated energy", and Nancy Princenthal wrote in the magazine Art in America that "these sculptures seem ready to detonate on contact". Similarly, critic Jonathan Goodman, writing for artcritical.com, said the sculptures were "eloquent but also brutalized shards of content [that] feel as though they are ready to explode." Critic William Zimmer wrote in the New York Times that the works give "the impression that they aren't achieved as much by sweat work as by natural, albeit mystical, accretion." Critic and poet Nancy Morejón, writing about the sculptures in The Black Scholar, "found in them indescribable truth and beauty", and highlighted the tactile nature of the works, saying that she wanted "to be able to touch the magic substance that formed these fragments". Curator Alison de Lima Greene noted the lyrical quality of the sculptures, saying that Edwards "brings almost a poet's eye to the assemblage of objects."

Writing about the range of materials in the works, critic Martin Herbert called the sculptures "blackened metal agglutinations" and said they "often resemble distorted, dehumanised faces." Brenson and curator Rodrigo Moura have both noted that the consistent presence of chains and padlocks in the sculptures is meant to signify enslavement and bondage, as well as the positive connections and bonds between people. In 1993, Brenson posited the view that the sculptures in the series are resolutely abstract and "do not represent any one thing"; according to him, although the sculptures somewhat resemble references to African masks and carry the associations of their materials – metal objects with a past use – the works' "compositional exchanges, sculptural unity, and poetic suggestiveness are always more persuasive than the functional reality of the objects within them." Curator April Kingsley said in 1981 that the early work from the series "looks very much like it came full-formed out of nowhere". Artist Rudolf Baranik, expanding on Kingsley's observation, wrote that while viewers could attempt to discern historical meaning in the individual items composing the sculptures, "it would only hinder the understanding."

Critic Barry Schwabsky argued in The Nation that the main focus of the sculptures was their visual presence as opposed to their social content: "The associative connotations, though inexpungible, remain secondary [...] Instead, the artist's fascination with the formal experience of art seems paramount." Likewise, critic Clarence D. White said in Art Papers that although the sculptures "owe their power primarily to the political and social historical allusions inherent in the fabulously varied inventory of industrial implements that figure in them", he viewed "the process of their being amalgamated into gripping presences" as equally important. Expanding on a similar point, critic Vivien Raynor wrote in the Times that "such is [Edwards's] gift for assemblage that in his hands a spike is not merely the means by which a railroad tie is secured [...] Since he does little to change the appearance of his ingredients, one can only conclude that they are transformed because he has chosen them." In ARTnews, critic Gail Gregg said that despite "the aggressiveness" of the materials in many of the works, "the Fragments contain an emotional synthesis", adding that "[Edwards] has taken the rich and varied stuff of his life and welded it into sculpture that not only confronts struggle but also celebrates it." Art historian Harmon Siegel wrote in the journal American Art about the meanings in the works' underlying materials: "These fragments are not neutral. Assembling them into the whole does not devalue them as parts [...] In that sense, Edwards insists on the tension between material as material, and material as thing".

Critic Cate McQuaid, writing in The Boston Globe, said the series uses art historical tools to convey historical meaning: "While the sculptures' industrial steel nods to Minimalism, their patina and social history flood them with associations to slavery, confinement, and the ongoing consequences of colonialism." Brenson, exploring the meaning of the title of the series, said: "While Lynch Fragments names, repeatedly, the fact of white supremacist terror against Black human beings, 'fragment' implies incompleteness, not finality", adding that many of the individual works' titles highlight "Black creativity [...] and they, as well as other titles, hint at stories that viewers will extend once they learn what they are." In Artforum, Ara H. Merjian observed that the evolution of the individual titles – and implied subject matter – in the series documented an array of historical wrongs: "The intermittent progression of Edwards's gnarled steel sculptures over the past five decades—responding to civil rights abuses, to Vietnam-era injustices, or to the government-sanctioned exportation of racialized violence to detention centers abroad—figures its own postwar history." Discussing the range of subject matter in the series as the works progressed, Saul Ostrow argued in Art in America: "Though Edwards's work has long been seen as a product of African-American indignation and pride, today we are able to recognize his sculptures as something more varied."

John Yau wrote in Hyperallergic that the early works from the series retained their visual power long after they were first shown and "have gained in resonance over time because they point to the physical pain and constraints that humans have had to endure throughout history." Writing in 2015 in Sculpture magazine, critic Joan Pachner said the series "retains its urgently relevant voice", adding that, "With metaphors that extend out into a broader commentary about African and American cultural intersections and race relations, his achievement is a mature and profound synthesis." Similarly, critic Ciarán Finlayson wrote in 2021 in Artforum that the works "have a brilliant transversal quality" and that "their idiom, developed over the past six decades, has lost none of its disquieting contemporaneity over time." Conversely, in frieze magazine, critic Morgan Quaintance argued that "the powerful affects these associations once provoked are now dampened by the spectator's historical distance" from the civil rights movement and struggles of the 1960s and 1970s, although Quaintance added: "Perhaps it's unfair to demand Edwards's work stand up to the strange and insidious world of contemporary metropolitan racism".

In 2026, ARTnews named the first work from the series the 18th best artwork about the United States. The same year, T: The New York Times Style Magazine included the series on its list of the 25 most important sculptures since 1945.

== Exhibition history ==
Edwards first exhibited sculptures from the series at the Santa Barbara Museum of Art in 1965. He regularly showed them in solo and group exhibitions throughout his life.

In 1978, Edwards showed 16 sculptures from the series at his first retrospective exhibition, a small show at the Studio Museum in Harlem. Nine works from the series were included in the touring exhibition Afro-American Abstraction, originating at New York's P.S. 1 Contemporary Art Center (Note: After closing in New York, the exhibition traveled to the Everson Museum of Art in Syracuse, New York, the Los Angeles Municipal Art Gallery, the Oakland Museum in Oakland, California, the Brooks Memorial Art Gallery in Memphis, Tennessee, the South Bend Art Center in South Bend, Indiana, the Toledo Museum of Art in Toledo, Ohio, the Bellevue Arts Museum in Bellevue, Washington, the Laguna Gloria Art Museum in Austin, Texas, and the Mississippi Museum of Art in Jackson, Mississippi.) in 1980 and curated by April Kingsley. Edwards staged a solo exhibition featuring works from the series at the Paul Robeson Center Galleries at Rutgers University–Newark in 1985.

He presented a number of Lynch Fragments sculptures in his first solo commercial gallery exhibition in 1990 at CDS Gallery in New York. In 1991 he opened a solo show of Lynch Fragments at the Hammonds House Galleries in Atlanta. His 30-year touring retrospective, originating at the Neuberger Museum of Art (Note: After closing in New York, the retrospective traveled to the Hood Museum of Art in Hanover, New Hampshire, the Art Museum at Florida International University in Miami, and the McNay Art Museum in San Antonio.) in Purchase, New York, in 1993, included a large number of Lynch Fragments. He exhibited sculptures from the series again in a solo show at CDS Gallery in 1994. In 1995 the Indianapolis Museum of Art mounted a solo exhibition for Edwards of works from the series.

In 2006, curator Kellie Jones selected several sculptures from the series for the survey exhibition Energy/Experimentation: Black Artists and Abstraction 1964-1980 at the Studio Museum in Harlem. A number of the sculptures were exhibited in Los Angeles in the Hammer Museum's (Note: After closing in Los Angeles, the exhibition traveled to MoMA PS1 in New York.) exhibition Now Dig This! Art and Black Los Angeles 1960-1980 in 2011.

Several works from the series were included in the 56th Venice Biennale in 2015, curated by Okwui Enwezor, the Biennale's first African curator. The same year, Edwards exhibited a large number of the sculptures in his 50-year traveling retrospective exhibition, originating at the Nasher Sculpture Center (Note: After closing in Texas, the retrospective traveled to the Zimmerli Art Museum at Rutgers University in New Brunswick, New Jersey, and the Columbus Museum of Art in Columbus, Ohio.) in Dallas. In 2017, sculptures from the series were included in the historical survey exhibition Soul of a Nation: Art in the Age of Black Power, originating at the Tate Modern (Note: After closing in London, the exhibition traveled to the Crystal Bridges Museum of American Art in Bentonville, Arkansas, the Brooklyn Museum in New York, The Broad in Los Angeles, the de Young Museum in San Francisco, and the Museum of Fine Arts, Houston.) in London, curated by Mark Godfrey and Zoé Whitley. The exhibition featured Some Bright Morning (1963) – the first work from the series – along with several other Lynch Fragments.

The São Paulo Museum of Art staged a survey of Lynch Fragments sculptures in 2018, the most comprehensive exhibition of the series to have been mounted. In 2024, over a dozen examples of the sculptures were presented in Edwards's traveling retrospective originating at the Fridericianum (Note: After closing in Germany, a version of the retrospective traveled to the Kunsthalle Bern in Bern, Switzerland, and the Palais de Tokyo in Paris.) in Kassel, Germany, his first in Europe.

== Selected sculptures in public collections ==
- Afrophoenix No. 1 (1963), Art Institute of Chicago
- Hers (1963), Virginia Museum of Fine Arts, Richmond, Virginia
- Nam (1973), Memorial Art Gallery, Rochester, New York
- Untitled (1973), Samek Art Museum, Bucknell University, Lewisburg, Pennsylvania
- Nigerian Diamond (1978), Rose Art Museum, Waltham, Massachusetts
- All Most (1985), National Gallery of Art, Washington, D.C.
- Early Time (1986), Museum of Fine Arts, Houston
- Justice for Tropic-Ana (dedicated to Ana Mendieta) (1986), Carnegie Museum of Art, Pittsburgh
- Katutura (1986), Museum of Modern Art, New York
- Palmares (1988), São Paulo Museum of Art
- Ready Now Now (1988), Metropolitan Museum of Art, New York
- Takawira - J (1989), Brooklyn Museum, New York
- Premonition (1990), Birmingham Museum of Art, Birmingham, Alabama
- Off and Gone (1992), Museum of Contemporary Art, Chicago
- Haitian September (1994), Columbus Museum of Art, Columbus, Ohio
- Deni Malick (1999), Fralin Museum of Art, Charlottesville, Virginia
- Iraq (2003), Nasher Sculpture Center, Dallas
- Night Work in Vermont (2003), Museu Afro Brasil, São Paulo
- Max Bond Architect (2009), National Museum of African American History and Culture, Washington, D.C.
- Two is One (2016), Wadsworth Atheneum, Hartford, Connecticut
- Numunake Inike OK (2019), Middlebury College Museum of Art, Middlebury, Vermont

== Notes, citations, and references ==
=== Cited references ===
- Aranke, Sampada (Winter 2020). "Blackouts and Other Visual Escapes". Art Journal. 79 (4). New York: College Art Association / Routledge: 62–75. doi:10.1080/00043249.2020.1779548. OCLC 1514294. EBSCOhost 147858045.
- Baranik, Rudolf (November–December 1985). "The Steel Won't Be So Heavy". Art Papers. Vol. 9, no. 6. pp. 20–23. OCLC 7219444. EBSCOhost 51309978.
- Brenson, Michael (1993). "Lynch Fragments". In Gedeon, Lucinda H. (ed.). Melvin Edwards Sculpture: A Thirty-Year Retrospective, 1963–1993. Purchase, New York / Seattle: Neuberger Museum of Art / University of Washington Press. pp. 20–33. ISBN 9780295973005. OCLC 28161746.
- Brenson, Michael (May–June 2024). "Melvin Edwards: 'You don't play around with that power'". Sculpture. Vol. 43, no. 3. pp. 60–71. OCLC 14039712. EBSCOhost 176350774.
- Craft, Catherine, ed. (2015). "This Life as a Sculptor". Melvin Edwards: Five Decades. Dallas: Nasher Sculpture Center. pp. 10–33. ISBN 9780991233830. OCLC 904049795.
- Edwards, Melvin (Fall 1992) [First published 1982, in Buhle, Paul, Jayne Cortez, Philip Lamantia, Nancy Joyce Peters, Franklin Rosemont, and Penelope Rosemont (eds.), Free Spirits: Annals of the Insurgent Imagination, San Francisco: City Lights Books.]. "Lynch Fragments". Sulfur. No. 31. pp. 30–32. OCLC 7587450. ProQuest 878741934.
- Edwards, Melvin (November 24, 2014). "An Oral History with Melvin Edwards by Michael Brenson". BOMB Magazine Oral History Project (Interview). Interviewed by Brenson, Michael. Bomb. OCLC 61313615. Archived from the original on November 26, 2024.
- Edwards, Melvin (October 15, 2015). "In conversation with Melvin Edwards at Frieze". Phaidon Press (Interview). Archived from the original on April 18, 2024.
- Goodman, Jonathan (December 1, 2012). "Resistance of Steel: Melvin Edwards at Alexander Gray". artcritical. Archived from the original on August 8, 2024.
- Gregg, Gail (February 1995). "Poetry in Heavy Metal" (PDF). ARTnews. Vol. 95, no. 2. pp. 104–107. OCLC 2392716. Archived (PDF) from the original on September 15, 2015.
- Irbouh, Hamid (2018) [First published 2000, in Ijele: Art eJournal of the African World. Vol. 1, no. 2.]. "Melvin Edwards' Lynch Fragments: Negritude and the Battle for Civil Rights in America". In Pedrosa, Adriano; Moura, Rodrigo (eds.). Melvin Edwards: Lynch Fragments. São Paulo Museum of Art. pp. 30–42. ISBN 9788531000515. OCLC 1061526860.
- Kimmelman, Michael (May 23, 1993). "Art View; Art That Goes Beyond Social Content". The New York Times. sec. 2, p. 35. OCLC 1645522. Archived from the original on May 26, 2015.
- Kingsley, April (1981). "Introduction". Sculpture by Mel Edwards (Exhibition pamphlet). Trenton, New Jersey: New Jersey State Museum. pp. Unpaginated. OCLC 28394865.
- Morejón, Nancy (Winter 1994). "Melvin Edwards: The World of a Marvelous Artist". The Black Scholar. Vol. 24, no. 1, Black Cultural History. Translated by Alegría, Carmen. The Black World Foundation. pp. 47–50. JSTOR 41068458. OCLC 1536543.
- Moura, Rodrigo (2018). "Lynch Fragments: Pieces of Life, Shards of History". In Pedrosa, Adriano; Moura, Rodrigo (eds.). Melvin Edwards: Lynch Fragments. Translated by Jojima, Tie. São Paulo Museum of Art. pp. 8–13. ISBN 9788531000515. OCLC 1061526860.
- Potts, Alex (2015). "Melvin Edwards' Sculptural Intensity". In Craft, Catherine (ed.). Melvin Edwards: Five Decades. Dallas: Nasher Sculpture Center. pp. 46–57. ISBN 9780991233830. OCLC 904049795.
- Princenthal, Nancy (January 1997). "Melvin Edwards at CDS". Art in America. Vol. 85, no. 1. p. 96. OCLC 1514286.
- Rapaport, Brooke Kamin (March 1993). "Melvin Edwards: Lynch Fragments". Art in America. Vol. 81, no. 3. pp. 60–65. OCLC 1514286.
- Schwabsky, Barry (July 17–24, 2017). "Do Something With It: The ambiguous sculptures of Melvin Edwards and Rachel Harrison". The Nation. Vol. 305, no. 2. OCLC 1643268. Archived from the original on April 23, 2024.
- Siegel, Harmon (Spring 2020). "Melvin Edwards Decides". American Art. 34 (1). University of Chicago Press: 86–111. doi:10.1086/709416. OCLC 24162804. EBSCOhost 142777467.
- Sims, Lowery Stokes (1993). "Melvin Edwards: An Artist's Life and Philosophy". In Gedeon, Lucinda H. (ed.). Melvin Edwards Sculpture: A Thirty-Year Retrospective, 1963–1993. Purchase, New York / Seattle: Neuberger Museum of Art / University of Washington Press. pp. 9–19. ISBN 9780295973005. OCLC 28161746.
- Wofford, Tobias (2015). "Reconsidering Black Internationalism". In Craft, Catherine (ed.). Melvin Edwards: Five Decades. Dallas: Nasher Sculpture Center. pp. 60–71. ISBN 9780991233830. OCLC 904049795.
- Wolff, Rebecca (2018). "'Nigeria Is Okay with Me!': Memory and History in Ibadan Oke (1992) and Ile Ogun (2003)". In Pedrosa, Adriano; Moura, Rodrigo (eds.). Melvin Edwards: Lynch Fragments. São Paulo Museum of Art. pp. 22–29. ISBN 9788531000515. OCLC 1061526860.
- Yau, John (September 6, 2015). "Will Some Bright Morning Ever Arrive?". Hyperallergic. OCLC 881810209. Archived from the original on September 6, 2015.
- Zwijnenberg, Robert (2021). "What Had Happened? Reflections in Response to Melvin Edwards' Lynch Fragments". In Westgeest, Helen; Zijlmans, Kitty (eds.). Mix & Stir: New Outlooks on Contemporary Art from Global Perspectives. Amsterdam: Valiz. pp. 45–53. ISBN 9789493246058. OCLC 1285274261.
