= Transcendence (sculpture) =

Transcendence is a 2008 stainless steel sculpture by the American sculptor Melvin Edwards. it was commissioned by Lafayette College in Easton, Pennsylvania to honor the first African-American graduate of the educational institution David K. McDonogh, who though born into slavery became a practising physician in the New York City area.

The work is stainless steel and sits outside of the Skillman library of the college, The sculpture is sixteen feet tall and weighs approximately four tons.
