= David C. Driskell Center =

Arts archive and research center in College Park, Maryland, USA

David C. Driskell Center for the Study of the Visual Arts and Culture of African Americans and the African Diaspora
- Location: College Park, Maryland
- Type: Arts archive and research center
- Established: 2001
- Affiliation: University of Maryland, College Park
- Director: Jordana Moore Saggese
- Website: https://driskellcenter.umd.edu/

The David C. Driskell Center for the Study of the Visual Arts and Culture of African Americans and the African Diaspora, known informally as the Driskell Center, is an arts archive and academic research center dedicated to African-American and Afro-diasporic art located at the University of Maryland, College Park (UMD). Named for the artist, African-American art historian, arts educator, and longtime UMD professor David C. Driskell, the Center houses a large collection of African-American art and art ephemera, as well as the personal archives of several African-American artists and academics. The Driskell Center was founded in 2001 and comprises several art and archival collections, a library, and an on-campus art gallery.

== Background and founding ==
David C. Driskell was an artist, art historian, educator, and art collector who was among the earliest proponents of the study of African-American art as a distinct, formal academic discipline, and he was widely credited during his lifetime as one of the world's foremost experts on African-American art and art history. Raised in Wilmington, North Carolina, and trained as an artist at both Howard University and Catholic University in Washington, D.C., Driskell taught at several historically black colleges and universities early in his career, including Talladega College, Howard, and a decade at Fisk University. In 1976 Driskell joined the faculty at UMD, eventually serving as the chair of the art department and Distinguished University Professor of Art before his retirement in 1998.

The Driskell Center was founded in 2001 by UMD, three years after Driskell's retirement from the university. Driskell continued to support the center's collections, exhibitions, and research until his death in April 2020 in Washington, D.C. Curlee R. Holton, a longtime artistic colleague of Driskell's, was director of the center until 2023. Art historian and UMD professor Jordana Moore Saggese succeeded Holton as director in July 2023.

== Collections ==
=== Art collections ===
The center houses an extensive collection of artwork by a wide range of African-American and Afro-diasporic artists. Driskell and his wife Thelma G. Driskell donated significant portions of their personal collections to the center, both before and upon David's death, including many works by Driskell himself. The art collection is organized into several sub-collections, including the Driskells' collections, several collections grouped by major donations and bequests, and acquisitions made by the Driskell Center.

Artists in the art collection include Emma Amos, Benny Andrews, Radcliffe Bailey, Richmond Barthé, Romare Bearden, John T. Biggers, Camille Billops, Louis Delsarte, Aaron Douglas, Melvin Edwards, Meta Vaux Warrick Fuller, Sam Gilliam, Loïs Mailou Jones, Paul Keene, Jacob Lawrence, Samella Lewis, Faith Ringgold, Preston Sampson, Augusta Savage, John T. Scott, Lou Stovall, Alma Thomas, James Lesesne Wells, Walter H. Williams, William T. Williams, Deborah Willis, Hale Woodruff, James Van Der Zee, and Driskell himself.

In 2024 the center unveiled its first permanent work of public art, David's Dream (2023), an abstract sculpture by artist Melvin Edwards commissioned by the center in Driskell's honor.

=== Archival collections ===
In addition to artwork, the Driskell Center also contains extensive archival collections from several artists, writers, and academics. Driskell donated his own complete artistic and academic archives to the center. Other individual archival collections include those of artist Faith Ringgold, art historian Tritobia Hayes Benjamin, and the arts-focused William E. Harmon Foundation.

== Exhibitions and programs ==
The center has staged dozens of exhibitions since its founding, including several that have gone on to travel to institutions around the country. Past exhibitions have included solo shows of work by Romare Bearden, Willie Cole, Faith Ringgold, and Kara Walker.
