= Breaking of the Chains =

Sculpture by Mel Edwards in San Diego, California, U.S.

- The sculpture in 2016
- Artist: Melvin Edwards
- Year: 1995
- Medium: Metal
- Location: San Diego, California, U.S.
- 32°42′33″N 117°09′49″W

Breaking of the Chains (1995) is an outdoor public art sculpture by Melvin Edwards, installed along Martin Luther King Jr. Promenade in San Diego, California.

The work is a large and tall metal sculpture that serves as a tribute to Martin Luther King Jr. and symbolizes the breaking the chains of discrimination. At the base of the sculpture is a plaque with a quote by Martin Luther King, reading: "Along the way of life, someone must have the sense enough, and morality enough to cut off the chain of hate. This can only be done by projecting the ethic of love to the center of our lives."

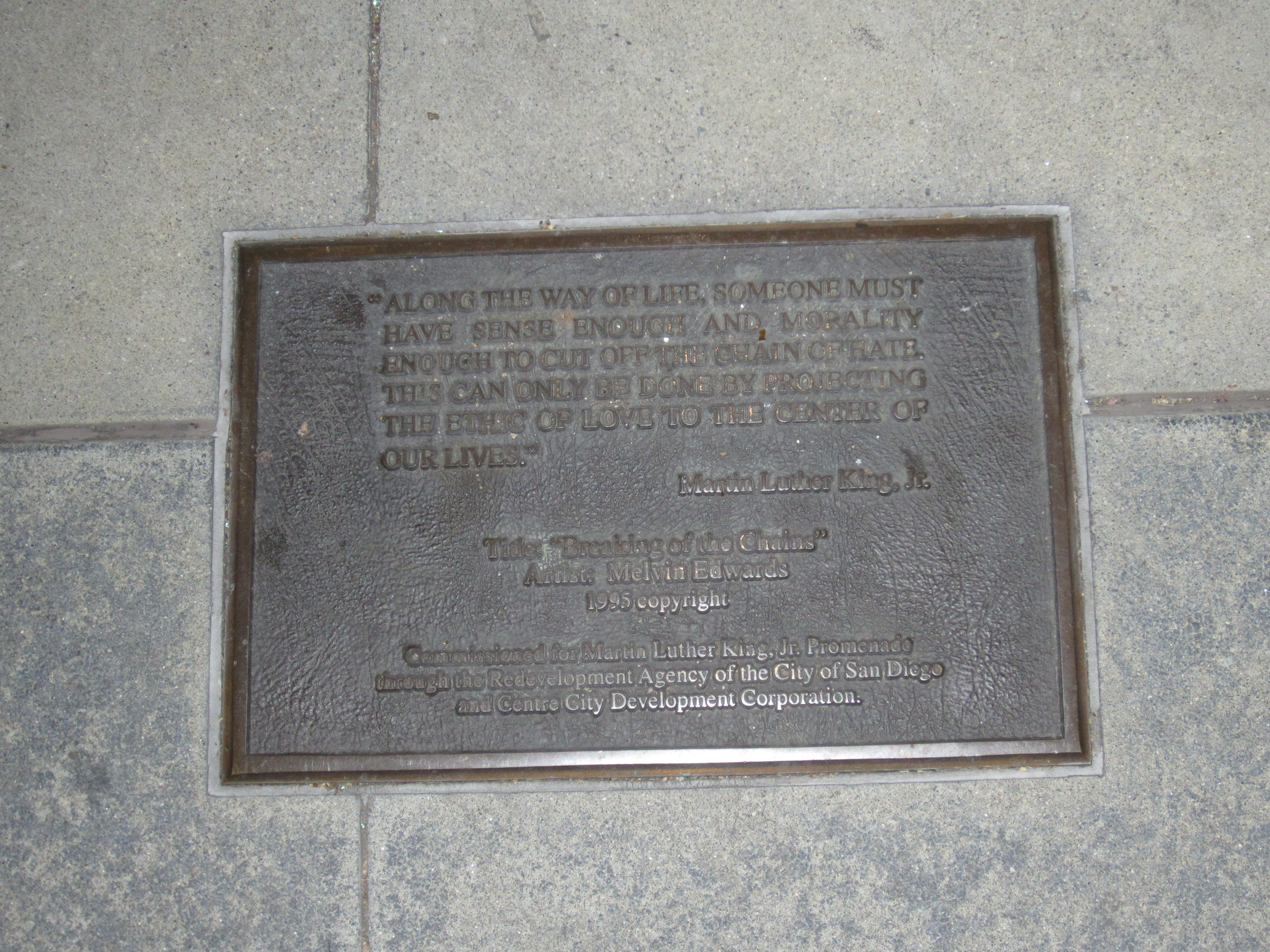
Plaque for the sculpture

== See also ==
- 1995 in art
