= David's Dream =

Sculpture by Melvin Edwards

- David's Dream in 2024
- Artist: Melvin Edwards
- Year: 2023
- Medium: Stainless steel
- Location: David C. Driskell Center, University of Maryland, College Park

David's Dream is a stainless-steel abstract sculpture by Melvin Edwards created in 2023 and permanently installed on the campus of the University of Maryland, College Park.

== Artwork ==
David's Dream comprises several large stainless-steel disks and geometric shapes, along with an enlarged stainless-steel chain running from the top to the bottom of one side of the sculpture. The various pieces are stacked and leaned onto one another and welded together.

== Background ==
The sculpture's namesake, art historian and artist David Driskell, was widely cited during his life as one of the most influential scholars of African-American art history and was often credited with the establishment of the discipline as a distinct area of academic study. Driskell was a professor at the University of Maryland, College Park, for more than two decades and the university's David C. Driskell Center was named in his honor.

In 2021, the Driskell Center announced a new commission of a work of public art by artist Melvin Edwards. The sculpture was unveiled and installed in April 2024. The work was funded in part by the Mellon Foundation's Monuments Project.
