= Cairns (sculpture) =

Sculpture in Portland, Oregon, U.S.

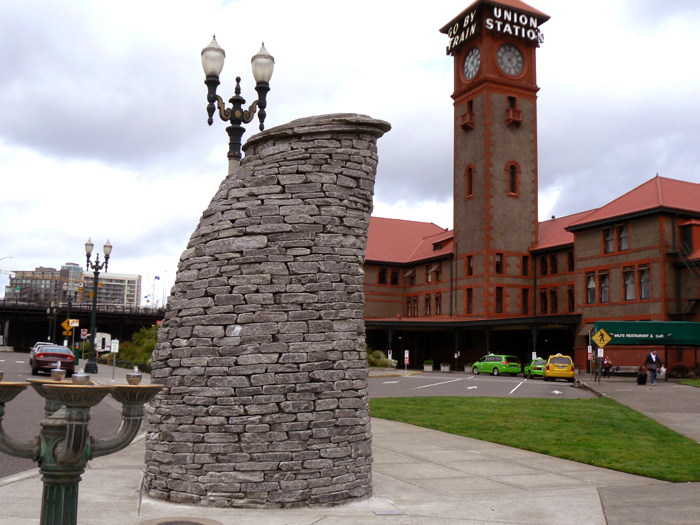
- One of the installation's five stacks in front of Portland Union Station in 2013
- Artist: Christine Bourdette
- Year: 2008
- Type: Sculpture
- Medium: Slate (or silver ledgestone)
- Subject: Cairns
- Location: Portland, Oregon, United States; 45.528195°N 122.6770992°W

Cairns is an outdoor 2008 public art installation by American artist Christine Bourdette, installed in the Old Town Chinatown neighborhood of Portland, Oregon, in the United States.

== Description ==
Christine Bourdette's Cairns (2008) consists of a series of five stacked slate (or silver ledgestone) forms near Portland Union Station at the north end of the Transit Mall in Portland's Old Town Chinatown neighborhood. The stacks are installed at Northwest 6th Avenue and Northwest Glisan Street, and along Northwest 5th and 6th avenues between Glisan and Irving streets. They create a path to the MAX Light Rail stations Union Station/NW 6th & Hoyt and Union Station/NW 5th & Glisan.

Bourdette was inspired by cairns, or stacks of stones are used as landmarks for memorials and navigation. She has said of the sculpture:

A progression of increments, marking departure and arrival, marking a path; these basic aspects of time and travel have governed my approach to the three Union Station sites. As I considered ways in which humans mark pathways, I thought of cairns, those man-made stacks of stones that mark hiking trails and which historically have served as landmarks for land and sea navigation, memorials, and commemorative markers. Travelers on cross-country trails traditionally add stones to cairns as they pass, resulting in animated and precarious stacks of rocks and pebbles. This evidence of human comings and goings, these reminders that others have followed the same path signify safety and reassurance out in the wilderness. In the urban wilderness, finding one's way through the various stages of hurry-up-and-wait are just as significant. These stand-alone works speak to the step-by-step marking of time, and incorporate varying degrees of elegance and playfulness. They are related to each other through this thematic underpinning and through the use of stone, but each responds to its site in its own way.

The sculptures measure 126 inches (3.2 m) x 69 inches (1.8 m) x 57 inches (1.4 m), 132 inches (3.4 m) x 73 inches (1.9 m) x 73 inches (1.9 m), 64 inches (1.6 m) x 28 inches (0.71 m) x 28 inches (0.71 m), 48 inches (1.2 m) x 32 inches (0.81 m) x 32 inches (0.81 m), 57 inches (1.4 m) x 23 inches (0.58 m) x 23 inches (0.58 m), and 88 inches (2.2 m) x 24 inches (0.61 m) x 24 inches (0.61 m), respectively. Cairns was funded by TriMet and is administered by the Regional Arts & Culture Council.

== See also ==
- 2008 in art
