= Pamela M. Lee =

Art historian

- Born: January 27, 1967 (age 59)

Academic background
- Education: Yale College; Harvard University

Academic work
- Discipline: Modern Art; Contemporary Art
- Sub-discipline: Relationship between aesthetics and politics
- Institutions: Yale University
- Notable works: Chronophobia: On Time in the Art of the 1960s

Pamela M. Lee is an art historian and Professor of Modern and Contemporary Art at Yale University. Her research focuses on late modernism and contemporary art, particularly the relationship between aesthetics and politics.

She graduated from Yale College and from Harvard University.

In her work Chronophobia: On Time in the Art of the 1960s, Lee studies art and technology in the 1960s. Within this period, such artists as Bridget Riley, Carolee Schneemann, Jean Tinguely, Andy Warhol, and On Kawara pique her interest. She “identifies an experience of time common to both [art and technology], and she calls this experience 'chronophobia'.” After studying Michael Fried's essay 'Art and Objecthood', she discovers that as time goes by, art starts to reflect the quickness of time. Within her work, Lee references Alvin Toffler's book Future Shock. She claims that “the concept of time they espouse is chronophobic as defined in her book, and their popularity means that their concept of time was widely shared.” In her work she fears “perpetual presentness, [that is] time is constant without conclusion.” Many chronophobes feel this way, they fear the fact that time is never ending.

== Works ==
- Object to be Destroyed: The Work of Gordon Matta-Clark (MIT Press, 2000) OCLC 638871766
- Chronophobia: On Time in the Art of the 1960s (MIT Press, 2004) ISBN 9780262622035, OCLC 897933737
- Forgetting the Art World (MIT Press, 2012) ISBN 9780262017732, OCLC 964793281
- New Games: Postmodernism after Contemporary Art (Routledge, 2012) ISBN 9781283994385, OCLC 862712297
- The Glen Park Library: A Fairy Tale of Disruption (no place press, 2019) ISBN 9781949484021
- Think Tank Aesthetics: Midcentury Modernism, the Cold War, and the Neoliberal Present (MIT Press, 2020) ISBN 9780262043526
