= Alexander Potts =

Canadian art historian

Alexander Desmond Potts FBA (Alex Potts or A.D. Potts) is a British-Canadian art historian, known for his contributions to the field of aesthetics, history of sculpture and modern art.

== Education ==
Potts received his bachelor's degree (with honors) in mathematics, physics and chemistry from the University of Toronto, Canada in 1965. He left Canada for England to study at the University of Oxford as a Rhodes Scholar from 1965 to 1968. At the University of London, he completed his PhD in art history in 1978.

== Career ==
After completing his PhD, Potts worked in schools across the United Kingdom, Europe, and US. From 1981 to 1989, he taught art history at Camberwell College of Arts in London (Senior Lecturer in the history of art from 1984, Principal Lecturer; Acting Head of Department (Art History and Conservation) in 1987 and 1989).

In 1996, Potts became a professor at the University of Reading, where he became the Head of the Department of history of art from 2000 to 2002. In 2002, he moved to the USA to serve as Chair of the Department of History of Art at the University of Michigan with a named chair position Max Loehr Collegiate Professor. He served as Chair until 2007 but remained teaching at UMich until 2019 He was awarded an emeritus status in 2020.

Potts served in various positions, among them, as the editor of the History Workshop Journal in 1984, juror for the Nasher Prize at the Nasher Sculpture Center from 2014 to 2018.

== Fellowships and awards ==
In 2005, Potts served as a visiting scholar at the Getty Research Institute in Los Angeles, 2007 Ailsa Mellon Bruce Senior Fellow at the Center for Advanced Study in the Visual Arts in the National Gallery of Art, Washington, 2009 Kirk Varnedoe Visiting professor at the Institute of Fine Arts of the New York University, From 2014 to 2015 Member of the School of Historical Studies at the Institute for Advanced Study of Princeton University, and 2017 winner of the College Art Association's Distinguished Teacher of Art History Award.

Potts was elected as an International Fellow of the British Academy in 2015.

== Research ==
Potts is well known for his work on modern sculpture, especially in his book The Sculptural Imagination (2000). Pamela M. Lee praised the book. Not all critics agreed with Potts' method. Art historian David Raskin pointed out that Potts' work reflects the integration of aspects of criticism into art history.

== Selected publications ==
=== Books ===
- Flesh and the Ideal. Yale University Press. 1994.
- The Sculptural Imagination. Yale University Press. 2000.
- Experiments in Modern Realism. Yale University Press. 2013.

=== Edited volumes ===
- 2012: Modern Sculpture Reader, with Jon Wood and David Hulks, Leeds: The Henry Moore Institute, 2007; reissued by the J. Paul Getty Museum, 2012, ISBN 978-1606061060

=== Articles and essays ===
- Potts, Alex (2004). "Tactility: The Interrogation of Medium in Art of the 1960s". Art History. 27 (2): 282–304. doi:10.1111/j.0141-6790.2004.02702004.x. ISSN 0141-6790.
  - Potts, A. (1 January 2004). "Autonomy in Post-war Art, Quasi-heroic and Casual". Oxford Art Journal. 27 (1): 43–59. doi:10.1093/oaj/27.1.43. ISSN 0142-6540.
  - "Eros in Piccadilly: monument and anti-monument". Sculpture and the pursuit of a modern ideal in Britain, c. 1880-1930. Aldershot, Hants, England; Burlington, VT : Ashgate. 2004. ISBN 978-0-7546-0996-4 – via Internet Archive.
- 2007: "Subjectivity, Civic Ideals, and Figures of Ideal Manliness: Representations of Masculinity in Late Victorian British Sculpture", in Stefan Dudink, Karen Hagemann and Anna Clark (eds), Representing Masculinity: Male Citizenship in Modern Western Political Culture, New York: Palgrave Macmillan, 2007.
- 2012: "Realism, Brutalism, Pop", Art History, Vol. 35, No.2, April 2012, pp. 288–313; reissued in Lisa Tickner and David Peters Corbett, eds., British Art in the Cultural Field 1939-69, Chichester: Wiley-Blackwell, 2012, pp. 91–115.
  - "Caro in the 1960s and the Persistent Object of Sculpture", The Sculpture Journal, Vol. 12, No. 2, 2012, pp. 51–62.
- 2013: "Realism and Materialism in Postwar European Art", in Warren Carter, Barnaby Haran and Frederic J. Schwartz, eds., Re/New Marxist Art History, London: Art/Books, 2013, pp. 400–418.
- 2014: "Paolozzi's Pop New Brutalist World", Tate Papers, Issue 21, April 2014.
- 2021: "The Public Gallery as Arena for Modern Sculpture", in Malcolm Baker and Inge Reist, eds, Sculpture Collections: Collecting, Ordering and Displaying Sculpture, Leiden: Brill, 2021
- 2025: "The Materialist Imagination: Essays in Honour of Caroline Arscott", with Thomas Hughes, in Oxford Art Journal, Volume 48, Issue 1, March 2025, pp. 1–6
