= William T. Williams =

American painter (born 1942)

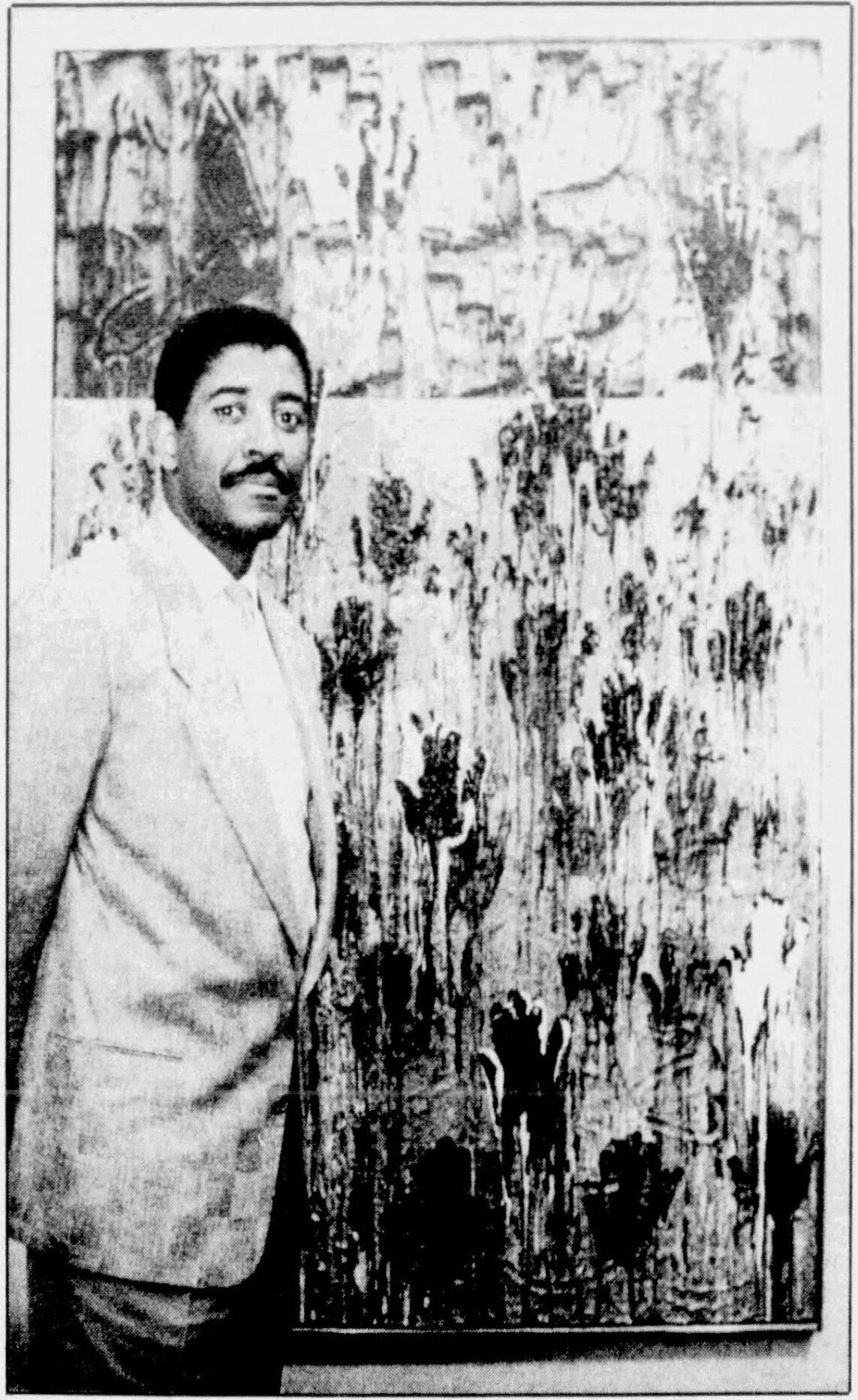
- Williams in 1985
- Born: July 17, 1942 (age 84); Cross Creek, North Carolina, U.S.
- Education: Pratt Institute, BA, 1966; Yale University, MFA, 1968
- Occupation: Visual artist
- Movement: Abstraction, Black Abstractionism, Geometric abstraction
- Website: Official website

William T. Williams (born 1942) is an American painter and educator. He is recognized as one of the "foremost abstract painters" of the past century. His work has been exhibited in more than 100 exhibitions in the United States, France, Germany, Ivory Coast, Japan, Nigeria, People's Republic of China, Russia, and Venezuela. Williams is credited with being the first Black painter to be included in H. W. Janson's History of Art, and is part of the Black Abstractionism canon. From 1971 to 2008, Williams was a professor of art at Brooklyn College, City University of New York. A Guggenheim Fellow, Williams he received the Murray Reich Distinguished Artist Award from the New York Foundation for the Arts in 2024. Williams lives in both New York City and Connecticut.

== Early childhood and education ==
William Thomas Williams was born on July 17, 1942, in Cross Creek, North Carolina, United States, to William Thomas Williams Sr. and Hazel Williams. Williams is African American. His family moved to Queens, New York, at age 4. He spent his childhood summers in Spring Lake, North Carolina. After the family's move to the north, his art talent was recognized by the head of a local community center, who gave him a room there to use as a studio. In 1956, he attended the School of Industrial Art in Manhattan (now the High School of Art and Design), which held many of its art classes at the Museum of Modern Art and the Metropolitan Museum of Art.

After Art and Design, Williams enrolled in New York Community College City Tech, where he earned an associate degree in 1962.

Williams continued his education at Pratt Institute. As a painting student, he took classes with and instruction from Richard Lindner, Philip Pearlstein, Alex Katz, and Richard Bove. During his junior year, he won a summer scholarship to The Skowhegan School of Art, and received a National Endowment for the Arts traveling grant. While in school he explored color field painting. He received a Bachelor of Fine Arts (BFA) degree in 1966 from Pratt Institute.

After Pratt, Williams attended Yale School of Art, where he received a Master of Fine Arts (MFA) degree in 1968. While at Yale, Williams had an idea for an artist residency program that would link an urban community with an art museum, laying the foundation for The Studio Museum in Harlem's artist-in-residence program. One of the museum's signature programs, the annual residency program attracts local, national, and international artists working in several media.

== The late 1960s and the 1970s ==
William T. Williams Trane, 1969 Acrylic on canvas. 108 × 84 in. (274.3 × 213.4 cm). The Studio Museum in Harlem; gift of Charles Cowles, New York.

From 1968 until 1970, Williams helped organize the Smokehouse Associates, a group of artists, including Guy Ciarcia, Melvin Edwards, and Billy Rose, who painted murals in Harlem in traditional and non-traditional spaces.The Smokehouse Associates were deeply influenced by the revolutionary concepts of abstraction and monumentality championed by artist Knox Martin, a Professor of Art at Yale when Williams studied there. Martin advocated for pushing art outside traditional, elite institutional gallery spaces and Martin's emphasis on "collaborative environmental projects" provided a blueprint for how large-scale, hard-edged geometric murals could structurally alter human interaction with public spaces.

Williams quickly gained attention from the mainstream art world. The Museum of Modern Art acquired his composition "Elbert Jackson L.A.M.F., Part II" in 1969, and by 1970 his work was exhibited at the Fondation Maeght in Saint-Paul-de-Vence, France.

In 1969 he participated in The Black Artist in America: A Symposium, held at the Metropolitan Museum of Art. He also took part in numerous exhibitions including the Studio Museum in Harlem's Inaugural Show, X to the Fourth Power, and New Acquisitions held at the Museum of Modern Art. In 1970 Williams was commissioned by the Jewish Museum (New York), and the Menil Collection in Houston, Texas.

Williams' first one-man show at New York's Reese Palley Gallery in 1971, resulted in the sale of every painting. The same year, the Whitney Museum of American Art exhibited his work twice; collectors such as AT&T and General Mills purchased his art; and his work was featured in both Life and Time magazines.

Williams returned home to the dusty unpaved roads of North Carolina for the inspiration of a new palette, one born of the luster and glow of mica, false gold, and fox fire from earth's pulsating cover. Williams' relief from color-field painting was celebrated in the new works completed between 1971 and 1977, such as Equinox and Indian Summer. In 1975 William also took part in an artist in residence program at Fisk University in Nashville, Tennessee.

In 1977, Williams participated in the second World Festival of Black Arts and African Culture in Lagos, Nigeria (FESTAC). This festival brought together more than 17,000 artists of African descent from 59 countries. It was the largest cultural event ever held on the African continent.

Starting in 1979, Williams changed his painting composition style by dividing the canvas into two distinct sections.

== The 1980s ==
Equinox, 1987

In 1982 Williams was included in Recent Acquisitions of the Schomburg Collection at the Schomburg Center in New York. In 1984, Williams took part in a show titled Since the Harlem Renaissance, which traveled to the University of Maryland, Bucknell University and the State University of New York at Old Westbury. It also traveled to the Munson-Williams-Proctor Arts Institute in Utica, New York, and the Chrysler Museum of Art in Norfolk, Virginia.

From 1984 to 1985, Williams was a visiting professor of art at Virginia Commonwealth University.

In 1985, he was featured in a solo exhibition at the Southeastern Center for Contemporary Art in Winston-Salem, North Carolina.

In 1986, Williams was the first Black contemporary artist to be included in the standard academic art history text, H.W. Janson’s The History of Art (Harry N. Abrams, Inc, 1979). Henry Ossawa Tanner was also included in the book.

In 1987 William received the John Simon Guggenheim Fellowship. He also was a member of a show that took place in Tokyo, Japan entitled The Art of Black America in Japan. William also took part in Contemporary Visual Expressions, a show at the Anacostia Museum and Smithsonian Institution in Washington, D.C..

William's traveled to Venezuela with painter Jack Whitten and sculptors Melvin Edwards and Tyrone Mitchell for the opening of their exhibition Espiritu & Materia at the Museum of Visual Arts, Alejandro Otero.

== The 1990s ==
In 1992 Williams was presented the Studio Museum in Harlem Artist's Award for lifetime achievement and his role in creating the artist-in-residence program for the museum.Robert Blackburn first invited Williams to make a print at the Printmaking Workshop in 1975. Over the next 22 years, Williams collaborated with Blackburn to produce 19 editions and a number of unique print projects. His last project at the Printmaking Workshop was in 1997 when he produced a number of monoprints underwritten by art patron, Major Thomas.

In 1994 Williams participated in a Jazz at Lincoln Center program titled "Swing Landscapes: Jazz Visualized". The intent of the Jazz Talk program was to explore what it is about jazz that makes its colors, rhythms and characters so attractive to the painter's eye. Williams and author, Alfred Appel Jr. discussed the influence of jazz on modern art. This program was part of a New York Citywide celebration honoring the artist Romare Bearden.

== The 2000s ==
In 2000 Williams took part in an extensive traveling show entitled To Conserve a Legacy: American Art from Historically Black Colleges and Universities. The show organized by the Addison Gallery of American Art at Phillips Academy in Andover, Massachusetts and the Studio Museum in Harlem in New York traveled to eight major museums including the Corcoran Gallery of Art, the Art Institute of Chicago, Fisk University, Duke University and Hampton Universities Art museums.

In 2005, Williams was invited to create a print at the Brandywine Workshop in conjunction with receiving the James Van Der Zee Award for Lifetime Achievement. Between July and late August he made five trips to Philadelphia, staying several days at a time. These trips yielded four editions and a number of unique hand-colored prints. The Artic Workshop located in Philadelphia was founded in 1972 to promote interest and talent in printmaking while cultivating cultural diversity in the arts.

In 2006, Williams was a visiting scholar and artist in residence at Lafayette College's Experimental Printmaking Institute (EPI), which included Williams lecture about his work sponsored by the David L. Sr. and Helen J. Temple Visiting Lecture Series Fund. During this year, Williams' work was also shown at the Studio Museum in Harlem in Energy and Experimentation: Black Artists and Abstraction 1964–1980.

In 2006, William T. Williams received the North Carolina Governors Award for Fine Arts by Governor Mike Easley.

In 2007, Williams was part of the group exhibition What Is Painting? Contemporary Art from the Collection at the Museum of Modern Art in New York City.

== The 2020s ==
In 2016, Williams was featured in the inaugural exhibition at the Smithsonian Institution's National Museum of African American History and Culture (Washington, DC), Visual Art and The American Experience.

In 2017, his work was included in the landmark exhibition Soul of a Nation: Art in the Age of Black Power, which was organized by Tate Modern, London, and traveled to six major institutions across the United States through 2020.

In 2024, Williams was included in The Metropolitan Museum of Art's group exhibition Flight into Egypt: Black Artists and Ancient Egypt, 1876–Now that remained on view until February 2025.

== Collections ==
Williams work appears in more than thirty museum collections, including the Museum of Modern Art; the Whitney Museum of American Art; the Governor Nelson A. Rockefeller Empire State Plaza Art Collection; the National Gallery of Art; North Carolina Museum of Art; the Schomburg Center for Research in Black Culture; the Menil Collection; Fogg Art Museum, one of the Harvard Art Museums; the Studio Museum in Harlem; the Library of Congress; the Yale University Art Gallery, Brooklyn Museum, The Jewish Museum, The Library of Congress, the National Museum of African American History and Culture, Colby College Museum of Art, David C. Driskell Center, Fisk University, Nasher Museum of Art, Philadelphia Museum of Art, Saint Louis Art Museum, Wadsworth Atheneum Museum of Art, and others.

== Awards and honors ==
- Murray Reich Distinguished Artist Award, New York Foundation for the Arts, 2024
- Oral History Project with LeRonn Brooks and Shanna Farrell, a partnership between the UC Berkeley Oral History Center and the Getty Research Institute, 2022
- Lifetime Achievement Award, 30th Annual James A. Porter Colloquium on African American Art, Howard University, 2019
- Pratt Institute Legends Award, 2018
- Oral History with Mona Hadler, BOMB magazine, 2018
- Inductee, National Academician, National Academy Museum & School, Class of 2017
- Skowhegan Governors Award for Outstanding Service to Artists, Skowhegan School of Painting & Sculpture, 2017
- Alain Locke International Award, Detroit Institute of Arts, 2011
- North Carolina Governor's Award for Fine Arts, North Carolina, 2006
- James Van Der Zee Award, Brandywine Workshop, Philadelphia, Pennsylvania, 2005
- Joan Mitchell Foundation, Grant Award, 1996
- Mid-Atlantic/NEA Regional Fellowship, 1994
- National Endowment for the Arts, Individual Artist Award, Painting, 1994
- The Studio Museum in Harlem Artist's Award, 1992
- City University of New York, Faculty Research Award, Painting, 1987
- John Simon Guggenheim Fellowship, 1987
- Creative Arts Public Service Grant, Painting, New York, 1985
- City University of New York, Faculty Research Award, Painting, 1984
- Creative Arts Public Service Grant, Painting, New York, 1981
- Creative Arts Public Service Grant, Painting, New York, 1975
- City University of New York, Faculty Research Award, Painting, 1973
- National Endowment for the Arts, Individual Artist Award, Painting, 1970
- Yale University, Grant for Graduate Study, New Haven, Connecticut, 1966
- National Endowment for the Arts, Traveling Grant, 1965
