= Gilberto de la Nuez =

Cuban outsider painter and woodcut maker

Gilberto de la Nuez (1913–1993) was a Cuban outsider painter and woodcut maker. Much of his work depicts themes taken from santería; he was also concerned with documenting Cuban history and customs. During his life he was a marginal figure in Cuban art; his stature has only risen somewhat after his death.
