= Art Journal (College Art Association journal) =

Academic journal

- Discipline: Art/art criticism/ art history
- Language: English

Publication details
- History: 1941–present
- Publisher: Routledge for the College Art Association of America (United States)
- Frequency: Bimonthly

Standard abbreviations
- ISO 4: Art J. (N. Y.)

Indexing
- ISSN: 0004-3249

Links
- Journal homepage

Art Journal, established in New York City in 1941, is a publication of the College Art Association of America (referred to as "CAA"). As a peer-reviewed, professionally moderated scholarly journal, its concentrations include: art practice, art production, art making, art history, visual studies, art theory, and art criticism. The main contributors are artists, scholars, critics, art historians, and other writers in the arts. It is both national and international in scope, and in recent years focusing on 20th- and 21st-century art, although for its first decades it concentrated more on earlier time periods in art history. It was originally published by the College Art Association as Parnassus (1929–1941), then College Art Journal (1941–1960), before changing its name to Art Journal in 1960.

Membership in CAA includes subscription to Art Journal. But single issues can be purchased. Back issues are available on JSTOR and ProQuest, among other databases.

== Awards ==
- 2002, Arts/Literature Coverage, Utne Independent Press Award
