= David K. McDonogh =

American ophthalmologist

David Kearny McDonogh
- Born: August 10, 1821; New Orleans, Louisiana
- Died: January 15, 1893 (aged 71); Newark, New Jersey
- Occupation: Ophthalmologist

David Kearny McDonogh (August 10, 1821 – January 15, 1893) was an American ophthalmologist, one of the first slaves to receive a college degree, and the first African-American eye specialist.

== Biography ==
In 1821, David McDonogh was born into slavery on the plantation of John McDonogh in New Orleans, Louisiana. John McDonogh, a supporter of the American Colonization Society, identified David and a fellow slave, Washington, as having the potential for "divine" leadership and hoped they would serve as missionaries in Liberia. Through his Presbyterian] connections, in 1838 John McDonogh enrolled both David and Washington at Lafayette College in Easton, Pennsylvania and appointed U.S. Senator from Pennsylvania Walter Lowrie as their guardian. While they were not the first black students to study at Lafayette, they were still forced to eat, study, and live away from the white students. By 1842, Washington left for Liberia without finishing his degree, leaving David behind to continue his studies. David continued in the study of theology and medicine, and took an apprenticeship with Hugh H. Abernathy, a doctor in Easton. This decision, however, was met with opposition from John McDonogh, who saw David's desire to learn medicine as reluctance to fulfill his promise to travel to Africa. The two had a falling out as David continued to push for his staying in the United States to earn a medical degree, while John attempted to pressure him into keeping by his original agreement to travel to Liberia as a missionary. The disagreement came to a climax when, in April 1844, David wrote to his master that he was, "decidedly, utterly, and radically" opposed to travelling to Africa. The reply from John McDonogh called David "ungrateful" and "unprincipled" and he contemplated cutting off David's funding and possibly force him back into bondage. Ultimately, he left the decision to Lowrie who kept David financially stable until he completed his degree in 1844. Upon the receipt of his degree, Lafayette College became the first college in America to confer a degree to a slave.

By 1845, John McDonogh had severed ties with David, who continued to rely on Lowrie for support. Through Lowrie, McDonogh was placed with Dr. John Kearny Rodgers for study at the College of Physicians and Surgeons of New York. While McDonogh wasn't officially listed as a student, and was refused a diploma, he completed his medical studies there in 1847 and officials from the school never challenged his claim that his medical education was attained at their school. When Rodgers died in 1850, McDonogh took Kearny as his middle name to honor him. From here, McDonogh went on to practice at the New York Eye and Ear Infirmary in Manhattan, and later in private practice for over 40 years as the first African-American eye specialist.

== Personal life ==
He married Elizabeth Van Wagoner in the 1850s and with her had three children, only one of whom survived into adulthood.

David K. McDonogh died in Newark, New Jersey in 1893 and is interred in Woodlawn Cemetery in the Bronx.

== Legacy ==
The first interracial hospital in Harlem, McDonough Memorial Hospital, operated in his honor from 1898 to 1904. (Note: Towards the end of his life, McDonogh added the letter "u" to his name, though contemporary and present sources still omit the letter when spelling his name)

A statue commemorating McDonogh was erected on the campus of Lafayette College, McDonogh's alma mater, in 2008. The 16-foot, five-ton sculpture is titled Transcendence, and was sculpted by Melvin Edwards to represent McDonogh's freedom from bondage. In 2018, McDonogh was awarded a posthumous medical degree from Columbia University.

In 2016, a scholarship in McDonogh's name for Ophthalmology/Ear, Nose and Throat (ENT) was dedicated by National Medical Fellowships, an organization whose mission is to increase the number of underrepresented physicians and health care professionals.
