= Robert Pincus-Witten =

American art critic, curator, historian

- Born: Robert Alfred Pincus; April 5, 1935; New York City, U.S.
- Died: January 28, 2018 (aged 82); New York City, U.S.
- Occupations: Art historian, art critic, curator, professor
- Spouse: Leon Hecht (m. 2013)

Robert Pincus-Witten (April 5, 1935 – January 28, 2018) was an American art critic, curator and art historian. Pincus-Witten is recognized for having created the term "Post-Minimalism" to characterize a variety of concepts and methods that began to emerge in the late 1960s as a reaction against the prevailing, detached Minimalism.

In addition to writing for Artforum for 50 years, Pincus-Witten curated exhibitions at the Gagosian Gallery and was the director of exhibitions at C&M Arts (now Mnuchin Gallery). He also wrote several books, including Postminimalism, Eye to Eye: Twenty Years of Art Criticism and Postminimalism Into Maximalism: American Art, 1966-1986.

== Biography ==
Robert Alfred Pincus was born in Manhattan on April 5, 1935, and raised in the Bronx. His Polish immigrant father Samuel Pincus, worked as a tailor. His mother Charlotte Pincus (née Wittenberg), was a German immigrant who worked for RCA as a Morse code specialist. He eventually adopted his mother's last name and started using Pincus-Witten.

Pincus-Witten earned his undergraduate degree at Cooper Union in New York City in 1956. He received his master's degree (1962) and Ph.D. (1968) from the University of Chicago. His dissertation, on Joséphin Péladan and the Salon de la Rose + Croix was written under Joshua Taylor and John Rewald.

In 1964, Pincus-Witten joined Queens College, City University of New York. Pincus-Witten, who was 29 at the time, had close ties to the Leo Castelli art crowd. "I was a star-fucker, and I wanted to know Andy Warhol," he recalled. He approached Warhol at the Factory and they became lovers.

In 1966, Pincus-Witten began writing criticism for Artforum magazine as its senior editor. He was promoted to professor at Queens College in 1970, and he became associate editor of Artforum in 1976.

An initial book on minimalism and the era following it was issued in 1977. His collected art criticism was published as Eye to Eye: Twenty Years of Art Criticism, in 1984. His treatise on postmodern art, Postminimalism into Maximalism: American Art 1966-1986, appeared in 1987. Postminimalism is an art term coined (as "post-minimalism") by Pincus-Witten in 1971, used in various artistic fields for work which is influenced by, or attempts to develop and go beyond, the aesthetic of minimalism.

Pincus-Witten retired from City University of New York in 1990. He curated art shows for the Gagosian Gallery (East) in New York City, until 1996. That same year he joined the staff of C&M Arts (Mnuchin Fine Arts), New York City, as Director of Exhibitions from 1996 to 2007.

On July 3, 2013, Pincus-Witten and Leon Hecht were married in New York City.

Pincus-Witten died in Manhattan on January 28, 2018, after a long illness.

== Books ==
- Postminimalism. New York: Out of London Press, 1977
- Entries (Maximalism): Art at the Turn of the Decade. New York: Out of London Press, 1983
- Eye to Eye: Twenty Years of Art Criticism. Ann Arbor, Michigan: UMI Research Press, 1984.
- Postminimalism into Maximalism: American Art, 1966–1986. Ann Arbor, Michigan : UMI Research Press, 1987
