= American Art (journal) =

Academic journal

- Discipline: American visual art
- Language: English

Publication details
- Former name(s): Smithsonian Studies in American Art
- History: 1987–present
- Publisher: University of Chicago Press for the Smithsonian American Art Museum (United States)
- Frequency: Triannual

Standard abbreviations
- ISO 4: Am. Art

Indexing
- ISSN: 1073-9300 (print); 1549-6503 (web)
- JSTOR: 10739300
- OCLC no.: 24162804

Links
- Journal homepage

American Art is a not-for-profit journal publishing peer-reviewed innovative scholarship on the history of art and related visual culture. It critically engages with the material and conceptual conditions of art and provides a forum for the expanding field of American art history. It welcomes scholarship on the role played by art in the ongoing transnational and transcultural formation of America as a contested geography, identity, and idea. Committed to rigorous inquiry, the journal presents a range of approaches to the production and consumption of art. It is published by the University of Chicago Press and was known until 1990 as Smithsonian Studies in American Art.
