= Paul Coates (publisher) =

American publisher, printer and community activist (born 1946)

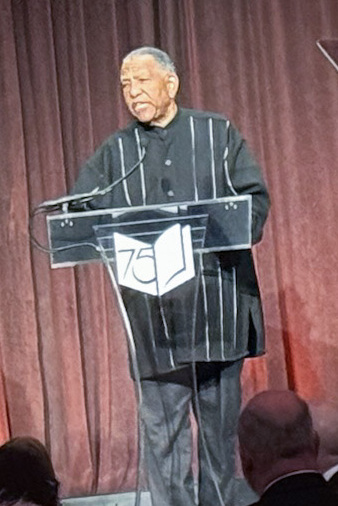
- Coates at the 2024 National Book Awards
- Born: William Paul Coates; July 4, 1946 (age 80); Philadelphia, Pennsylvania, U.S.
- Education: Antioch University (BA); Atlanta University (MLIS)
- Occupations: Publisher, printer and community activist
- Organization: Black Classic Press (founder)
- Children: 7, incl. Ta-Nehisi Coates (son)
- Awards: Dorothy Porter Wesley Award; Lord Nose Award; Literarian Award for Outstanding Service to the American Literary Community

William Paul Coates (born July 4, 1946) is an American publisher, printer and community activist. In 1978, he founded the Black Classic Press (BCP), devoted to publishing works significant to people of African descent, particularly previously out-of-print books. He also established the printing company BCP Digital Printing in 1995. He is the father of author and journalist Ta-Nehisi Coates.

== Biography ==
W. Paul Coates was born on the West end of Philadelphia, to Edna Coates and Douglas Cryor. Leaving high school early, Coates enlisted in the U.S. Army; he found himself the target of harassment and racism, but he also happened upon Richard Wright's memoir Black Boy, which led Coates to discover other Black writers, such as Malcolm X, Dick Gregory, and James Baldwin. In 1965, Coates was sent to serve in Vietnam, where he worked as a military policeman in a K-9 unit. He was discharged in 1967.

Upon his return to the U.S., he settled in Baltimore, Maryland, and began working as a volunteer in the Black Panther Party's breakfast program. Becoming defense captain of the Baltimore Black Panthers, he was "in charge of managing all Panther activities in Maryland, including implementing free clothing and free food programs and housing assistance, before leaving the organization in 1971".

Using the G.I. Bill, which provided financial support for veterans to attend college, Coates earned a Bachelor of Arts degree in community development from the Homestead Montebello Center of Antioch University in Baltimore in 1979. He then obtained a master's degree in library science from Atlanta University in 1980. After completing his education, he worked at Howard University's Moorland-Spingarn Research Center until 1991. He co-edited, with Elinor Des Verney Sinnette, Black Bibliophiles and Collectors: Preservers of Black History (Howard University Press, 1990).

In 1972, with other activists, he established the George Jackson Prison Movement to bring Afrocentric literature to Maryland jails and prisons, aiming to "retrieve the souls and minds of the incarcerated". The program was run from a bookstore Coates and another former Panther set up in 1973 called The Black Book, and he subsequently turned his efforts to founding, in 1978, the Black Classic Press (BCP), characterized as "a mission-driven publishing venture focused on preserving the collective story of African-American people". Originally headquartered in the basement of his home, with the company's first publications being pamphlets printed on a photocopier, BCP would survive over decades to become one of the longest-running continuous African-American book publishers, alongside Haki Madhubuti's Third World Press.

In 1995, Coates launched BCP Digital Printing to specialize in short-run printing, about which he said in 2018: "There are many publishing companies, but there's still only one Black book printing company in this country that I know of, and that's Black Classic Press."

An impactful landmark for BCP came in 1997 when author Walter Mosley granted the company publication rights to his novel Gone Fishin'—deliberately opting for an independent Black publisher and waiving his customary six-figure advance—and the novel became one of BCP's most successful titles, with sales of more than 100,000 copies. Among other notable contemporary and historical authors whose work has been published by BCP are John Henrik Clarke, E. Ethelbert Miller, Yosef Ben-Jochannan, Dorothy B. Porter, Amiri Baraka, Larry Neal, W. E. B. Du Bois, Edward Blyden, J. E. Casely Hayford, Bobby Seale, John G. Jackson, Carter Woodson, and J. A. Rogers, with BCP specializing in works significant to people of African descent. As Coates says in the mission statement of BCP: "We began publishing because we wanted to extend the memory of what we believe are important books that have helped in meaningful ways to shape the Black diasporic experience and our understanding of the world."

Coates is a founding member and chair of the National Association of Black Book Publishers and has served as an adjunct instructor of African American Studies at Sojourner-Douglass College in Baltimore.

== Awards ==
In 2018, in recognition of his excellence in contributing to the information profession Coates received the inaugural Dorothy Porter Wesley Award from the Association for the Study of African American Life and History (ASALH), established "to honor and document the outstanding work of Information Professionals; Bibliophiles, Librarians, Archivists, Curators and Collectors."

In 2020, the Community of Literary Magazines and Presses (CLMP) awarded Coates its Lord Nose Award, given annually in recognition of a lifetime of work in literary publishing.

In 2024, Coates received the Literarian Award from the National Book Foundation for Outstanding Service to the American Literary Community. David Steinberger, chair of the National Book Foundation, stated: "Over the course of his career, W. Paul Coates has recovered and discovered countless essential works of Black literature, and readers everywhere have reaped the benefits of his passion and care for the written word. Since the 1970s, Coates has modeled what it means to be a community-focused independent publisher and tireless advocate for Black diasporic writers and books." The award was presented to Coates on November 20 by Walter Mosley.

== Personal life ==
Coates has seven biological children, as well as two bonus children through his third marriage to Rosalyn Wilcots Coates, in 2008. His son Ta-Nehisi writes about growing up with his father in a well-received 2008 memoir and tribute, entitled The Beautiful Struggle. In the Los Angeles Times, Lynell George summarized the book by saying: "What overshadows all is his father's presence, his omnipresence—the profile and teachings of a man who had a strong hand in the rearing of his progeny, both his intimate circle and the extended family of African Americans traversing an uncertain landscape. His guiding principle was simple: 'I'm not here to be your friend. My job is to get you through. To make you conscious of the world around you. To teach lessons that can carry over.'"

The 2020 book The Brother You Choose: Paul Coates and Eddie Conway Talk About Life, Politics, and The Revolution, written by Susie Day, is an exploration of the friendship forged during prison visits that Coates made to support Eddie Conway, a former associate through the Black Panther Party, who had been wrongfully convicted and was incarcerated for more than four decades, until his release on parole in 2014.
