= James A. Porter Colloquium on African American Art =

The James A. Porter Colloquium on African American Art and Art of the African Diaspora is an annual event hosted and sponsored by Howard University.

James Porter is recognized as the "Father of African American art history." His book, Modern Negro Art, is the first comprehensive study of African American Art in the United States. In 1990, his Howard colleague, art historian Floyd C. Coleman, created the colloquium to recognize Porter for his distinguished career as an art professor, art department chair, and university art gallery director.

Since its founding, the Porter Colloquium has served as a forum for art historians, artists, curators, collectors, and art dealers in the field of African American Art. The annual gatherings have explored issues in the historiography of African American art, promoted diverse artistic perspectives, presented forward-thinking scholarship, and opened doors for the advancement of African American artists and art historians who study art of the African Diaspora.

== History ==
| Year (Annual) | Title / Theme | Co-Sponsors | Speakers and Moderators | Reference |
|---|---|---|---|---|
| 2024 (34th) | Art Legacies, Aesthetic Futures: Art at Howard University | David C. Driskell Center, The Phillips Collection, Terra Foundation for American Art | Melvin Edwards, Phylicia Rashad, Huey Copeland, Steven Nelson, Jonathan P. Binstock, Raimi Gbadamosi, Melanee C. Harvey, Rebecca Van Diver, Jada Adkinson, Edward T. Welburn, Mark Bartley, Cheryl Miller, Tatum Sabin, Samir Meghelli, Kelis George, Adrienne Childs, Denise Murrell, Elyse Nelson, Jessica Bell Brown, Camille Brown, Taylor Aldridge, Jane Carpenter-Rock, Rhea Combs, Kinshasha Holman Conwill, Gwendolyn Everett, Jacqueline Carmichael, Larry W. Cook, Elka Stevens, Reginald Pointer, Sandy Bellamy, Bryten Gant, Takovah Townsend, Maria Fenton, Adrian Loving | |
| 2023 (33rd) | Shaping Space: African American Artists in Public Art and Private Collections | David C. Driskell Center, National Gallery of Art | Steven Nelson, Phylicia Rashad, Raimi Gbadamosi, Melanee C. Harvey, Mabel O. Wilson, Sandy Bellamy, Curtis Clay, Ronnie McGhee, Nea Maloo, Uzikee Nelson, Keith Morrison, Camille Brown, Melvin Edwards, Tobias Wofford, Renée Ater, Martha Jackson Jarvis, Njena Jarvis | |
| 2022 (32nd) | Fearless Endeavors: Daring Art History Methodologies and Art Practices | David C. Driskell Center | Sarah Lewis, Alvia Wardlaw, Kimberly D. Jacobs, Lilian Thomas Burwell, Gwendolyn Everett, Huey Copeland, Bisa Butler, Betye Saar, Lillian Thomas Burwell, Stephanie Sparling Williams, Lorraine O’Grady | |
| 2021 (virtual) | Defining Diaspora: 21st Century Developments in Art of the African Diaspora. | David C. Driskell Center, Center for Advanced Study in the Visual Arts at the National Gallery of Art, Robert Rauschenberg Foundation, Michael Rosenfeld Gallery | Erica Moiah James, Freida High Wasikhongo Tesfagiorgis, Kobena Mercer, Renée Stout, Curlee Raven Holton, Larry Cook, Aïda Muluneh, Natalie Hopkinson, Akili Tommasino, Willis “Bing” Davis | |
| 2020 | | | | |
| 2019 (30th) | Critical In/Sight: Contemporary Developments in the History and Practice of Black Visual Culture | David C. Driskell Center, Center for Advanced Study in the Visual Arts at the National Gallery of Art, Sandra Jackson-Dumont (book donation for all attendees) | Nicole Fleetwood, Margo Natalie Crawford, Raél Jero Salley, Lanisa Kitchener, Steven Nelson, Lola Flash, Martina Dodd, Janell Pryor, Monica O. Montgomery, Anthony Barboza, William T. Williams, Sylvia Snowden, Krista Thompson, Richard Powell, Mel Harvey, Kimberly Drew, Larry Cook, Jordana Moore Saggese, Renee Stout, Michelle Renee Perkins, Courtnee Fenner, Halima Taha, Rachel Grace Newman | |
| 2018 (29th) | Abstraction: Form, Philosophy, & Innovation (including Black Abstractionism) | | Gwendolyn Everett, Gregory N’namdi, Kesha Bruce, Gregory Coates, Melani Douglass, Nikki A. Greene, Charles Brock, Michèle Gates Moresi, Tobias Wofford, Seth Feman, John A. Tyson, Tuliza Fleming, Robin Veder, Romi Crawford, Kevin Tervala, Evelyn Hankins, Freida High W. Tesfagiorgis, Victor Ekpuk, Lanisa S. Kitchiner, Chakaia Booker, Jessica Stafford Davis, Adrian Loving, Zoma Wallace, Melissa Messina, LeRonn P. Brooks, Margo N. Crawford, Mary Lovelace O’Neal, Fred Eversley, James Maurelle, Amber Robles-Gordon, Valerie Cassel Oliver, Torkwase Dyson, Edward Spriggs, Reginald Pointer | |
| 2017 (28th) | The Everlasting Now | | Lorna Simpson, Kinshasha Holman Conwill, Dawoud Bey, Fred Wilson (artist), Adger Cowans, Kellie Jones, Bridget R. Cooks, Lopez Matthews Jr., Andrea Jackson, Pellom McDaniels III, Stephanie Smith, Scott Baker, Gwendolyn Everett, Anthony McEachern, Dalila Scruggs, Gwendolyn Shaw, James D. Smalls, Kirsten Buick, David C. Driskell, Melanee C. Harvey, Larry Cook, Aziza Claudia Gibson-Hunter, Margaret Rose Vendryes, Cynthia Hodge, Kimberly Camp, Kelli Morgan, Alexsandra Mitchell, Catrina Hill, Tina Campt, Chanda Laine Carey, Tiffany E. Barber, Elka Stevens, Marilyn Nance, Sarah Lewis, Allen Jackson | |
| 2016 | | | | |
| 2015 | | | | |
| 2014 | | | | |
| 2013 | | | | |
| 2012 | | | | |
| 2011 | | | | |
| 2010 (21st) | Fearless: Risk Takers, Rule Breakers, and Innovators in African American Art and Art of the African Diaspora | David C. Driskell Center, District of Columbia Commission on the Arts and Humanities (Black Artists of DC exhibit), The Historical Society of Washington, DC | Elizabeth Catlett, Peggy Cooper Cafritz, Floyd W. Coleman, Gwendolyn H. Everett, Jacqueline Francis, Okwui Enwezor, Tritobia Hayes Benjamin, James Donaldson, Teresia Bush, Jacqueline Francis, Winifred Owens-Hart, Kirsten P. Buick, Theresa Leininger-Miller, Lisa Farrington, Renee Cox, Lyle Ashton Harris, Ashanti Chaplin, Elka Stevens, Gary Lampley, Teri Agins, LaQuan Smith, Constance Porter Uzelac, Robert Hall, Tuliza Fleming, Nico Wheadon, Thomas Stanley, Alvah Beander, Michael D. Harris, Chika Okeke-Agulu, Valerie Cassel Oliver, Bill Adler, Cey Adams, Naomi Beckwith | |
| 2009 (20th) | | | | |
| 2008 (19th) | | | | |
| 2007 (18th) | Migration, Globalization: Developing New Art Historical and Critical Narratives in African American Art and Art of the African Diaspora | David C. Driskell Center, IBM, JP Morgan Chase, PNC Bank | Robert Farris Thompson, Evangeline J. Montgomery, Floyd Coleman, Bennie F. Johnson, Gwendolyn Everett, James Donaldson, Coni Porter Uzelac, Janell Blackmon, Phyllis Jackson, Jacqueline Francis, Mary Ann Calo, Dasha Halkin, Lyneise Williams, John Bowles, Courtney Martin, Tritobia Hayes Benjamin, Nana Mtendaji, Pamela Franco, Cheryl McKay Dixon, Nkiru Nzegwu, Cheryl Finley, Jefferson Pinder, Iona Rozeal Brown, Zoe Charlton, Mark Bradford, Allan Gordon, Carol Ann Duncan, Leland Swanson, Tess Schwab, Raymond G. Dobard, Wendell Brown, Arthur Monroe, Shirley Woodson Reid, Frank Smith, Jeffreen Hayes, Teresia Bush, Mary Schmidt Campbell | |
| 2006 (17th) | Art, Artists, and Activism: The Black Arts Movement Revisited, Recontextualized | David C. Driskell Center, JP Morgan Chase, PEPCO | Faith Ringgold, Kinshasha Holman Conwill, Akua McDaniel, Ethelbert Miller, Murry Depillars, Gwendolyn Everett, James Donaldson, Coni Porter Uzelac, David Taft Terry, Carol R. Dyson, Valerie Maynard, Kay Brown, Frank Smith, Nelson Stevens, David C. Driskell, Tritobla Hayes Benjamin, Jeffreen Hayes, Ruth Fine, Lizzetta LeFalle-Collins, Kymberly Pinder, Gina Maria Lewis, Lisa Farrington, Curlee Holton, Betty Blayton-Taylor, Lowery Stokes Sims, Sandra Davis, Freida High Tesfagiorgis, Eleanor Traylor, Haki Madhubuti, Roy Lewis, Bennie F. Johnson, Lisa Gail Collins, Margo Crawford, Cherise Smith, Aziza Claudia Gibson Hunter, E. J. Montgomery, Margo Humphrey, Akili Ron Anderson, James Phillips, Chandra Cox, Kirsten P. Buick, Gregory Carr, A.B. Spellman, Sandra Epps, Allison Bolah, Grace Hampton, Adrienne Hoard, Cheryl Finley, Rebekkah Mosby, Juliette Harris, Camille Billops, Marta Reid Stewart, Jefferson Pinder, Winston Kennedy, Babatunde Lawal | |
| 2005 (16th) | Canonical Formations of African American Art and Art History | David C. Driskell Center | Floyd Coleman, Bennie F. Johnson, Gwendolyn Everett, Richard English, Coni Porter Uzelac, Teresia Bush, Leslie King Hammond, Linda Crocker Simmons, Jeffreen Hayes, Gwendolyn Everett, Sandy Bellamy, Scott Baker, Peter Robinson, Teixeira Nash, Edward Jesse Shaw, Sharon Patton, Edmund B. Gaither, Tritobia Hayes Benjamin, Richard A. Long, Sandra Davis, Alvia Wardlaw, Dewey Mosby, Patricia Hills, Allan Gordon, Raymond Dobard, Kellie Jones, Al Smith, Keith Morrison, Deborah Willis, Lisa Collins, Margo Crawford, Adrienne Childs, Franklin Sirmans, Kristopher J. Cheeves, Imani Perry, Clecia Queiroz, Lou Stovall, Akili Ron Anderson, Yvonne Pickering Carter, Salah Hassan, Juliette Harris, Rebekah Mosby, David C. Driskell | |
| 2004 (15th) | Setting the Standards: Voices of Resistance and Empowerment | Riggs National Bank | Gwendolyn Everett, Tritobia Hayes Benjamin, Coni Porter Uzelac, Sandra Davis, Arturo Lindsay, Glen McNatt, Donna Wells, Winston Kennedy, Michael D. Harris, Bennie F. Johnson, Robert Steele, Kathryn Coney, Margaret Hutto, Deirdre Bibby, Kimberly Camp, Deborah Willis, Jeffreen Hayes, Tosha Grantham, Krista Thompson, Gwendolyn DuBois Shaw, Isolde Brielmaier, Jeremy Austin, Renee Stout, Danny Simmons, Gerald Cyrus, Michael Platt, Floyd Coleman | |
| 2003 (14th) | Memory, Metaphor and Gender: Black Women in Art and Visual Culture: : In honor of Samella Lewis | | Renee Ater, Tritobia Hayes Benjamin, Kirsten Buick, Valerie Cassel, Sonya Clark, Floyd Coleman, Lisa Gail Collins, Doris Crusoe, Justine Presha DeVan, Bed Ellerson, Lisa Farrington, Cheryl Finley, Nicole Fleetwood, Leslie King Hammond, Michael D. Harris, Mary Jane “MJ” Hewitt, Margo Humphrey, Sandra Jackson, Meta DuEwa Jones, Teresa Leininger-Miller, Gina Lewis, Nashormeh Lindo, Valerie Maynard, E. J. Montgomery, Winnie Owens-Har, Kebedech Tekleab, Freida High W. Tesfagiorgis, Lauren Turner, Coni Porter Uzelac, Joyce Wellman, Carla Williams, Deborah Willis, Shirley Woodson | |
| 2002 | | | | |
| 2001(12th) | Migrations and the Diaspora: Caribbean and African American Connections | Anacostia Museum and Center for African American History and Culture | Edmund Barry Gaither, Margaret Bernal, Veerle Poupeye, Jerry Philogene, Pamela Franco, Teresia Bush, Evelyn Hawthorne, Mora J. Beauchamp-Byrd, Fritz Racine, Nestor Hernandez, Winston Kennedy, Ben Jones, Francisco Cabral, Michael Auld, Roberta McLeod, Steven C. Newsome, Leslie King-Hammond, Marta Moreno Vega, Dietra Montague, Osvaldo Mesa, Marta Moreno Vega | |
| 2000 (11th) | Converging Images: Printmaking and Photography in African American Art | Anacostia Museum and Center for African American History and Culture, the Nathan Cummings Foundation, David C. Driskell, and Constance Porter Uzelac. | Floyd W. Coleman, Steven C. Newsome, Roshini Kempadoo, Stephen Marc, Wendel A. White, Jennifer Morris, Constance Porter Uzelac, Tritobia Hayes Benjamin, Alvia Wardlaw, Leslie King-Hammond, Winston Kennedy, Allan Edmunds, Claude Ellliot, Claudia Gibson-Hunter, Arthe Anthony, Camara Holloway, Denise Andrews, Donna M.Wells, Michele L. Simms-Burton, Deborah Willis, Bill Gaskins, Clarissa Sligh, Dawoud Bey, Dennis Callwood, Remy Gastambide, Talib Haqq, Mark Williams, Michael Harris, Kellie Jones, Lisa Gail Collins, Ademola Olugebefola, Mei-Tei-Sing Smith | |
| 1999 (10th) | | Anacostia Museum and Center for African American History and Culture | | |
| 1998 (9th) | | Anacostia Museum and Center for African American History and Culture | | |
| 1997 | | | | |
| 1996 | | | | |
| 1995 | | | | |
| 1994 | | | | |
| 1993 | | | | |
| 1992 | | | | |
| 1991 | | | | |
| 1990 (1st) | The Inaugural James A. Porter Symposium in African Art | | Tritobia Hayes Benjamin, Murray N. DePillars, David C. Driskell, Edmund Barry Gaither, Dorothy B. Porter | |
