= James A. Porter =

African-American art historian, artist and teacher (1905–1970)

- Born: James Amos Porter; December 22, 1905; Baltimore, Maryland, United States
- Died: February 28, 1970 (aged 64)
- Education: The Art Institute of New York City, Sorbonne University; New York University; Howard University
- Occupations: Art historian, artist and teacher
- Known for: African-American art history
- Spouse: Dorothy Burnett (m. 1929)

James Amos Porter (December 22, 1905 – February 28, 1970) was an African-American art historian, artist and teacher. He is best known for establishing the field of African-American art history and was influential in the African American Art movement.

== Early life and education ==
Porter was born in Baltimore, Maryland on December 22, 1905. His father was an African Methodist Episcopal minister and his mother was a teacher. His brother John taught him to paint. He attended schools in Washington D.C. between 1918 and 1923, and later attended Howard University. Under the direction of James V. Herring, head of the Art Department at Howard University, Porter studied painting, drawing, and art history, and graduated with honors in Art in 1927.

In 1929, Porter studied at The Art Institute of New York City, where he won the Arthur Schomburg Portrait Prize, Teachers College, Columbia University, and at the Art Students League of New York. In 1933, his prize winning painting, "Woman Holding A Jug," was selected for the Harmon Foundation Exhibition of Negro Artists.

In 1935, Porter received a scholarship from the Institute of International Education and was the recipient of a Rockefeller Foundation grant that allowed him to study art in Europe. He studied Baroque art at the Institute of Art and Archeology at the Sorbonne. He received the Certificat De Presence from the Institute of Art and Archeology, University of Paris in August 1935.

He returned to the United States where he attended New York University, graduating in 1937 with a master's degree in art history. Porter's master's thesis, later the subject for his influential book Modern Negro Art, focused on African-American art and artists.

== Career ==
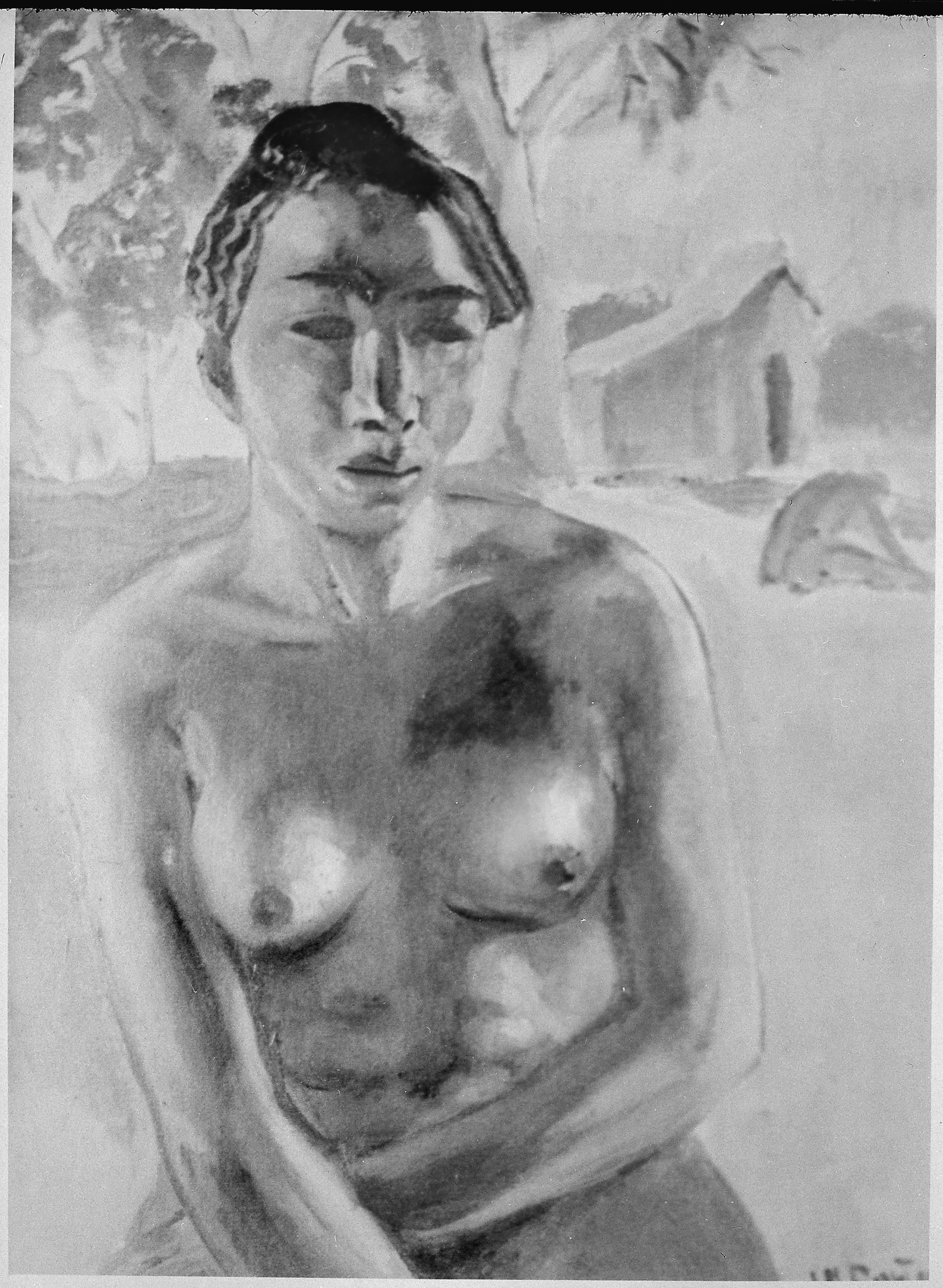
James A. Porter, African Nude, 1934. Harmon Foundation Collection

Porter began his career as an instructor of painting and drawing at Howard University. During his four decade Howard tenure, he would work with artists, such as James Lesesne Wells and Lois Mailou Jones, chair the Art Department, and serve as Director of the Art Gallery (1953 through 1970). David Driskell, one of Porter's students at Howard, recalled in an interview with Xavier Nicholas that he was the only student in his "Negro Art" class one semester but "He taught that course as though he had a hundred students there, and I was the only one."

He published Modern Negro Art in 1943, the first comprehensive study in the United States of African-American art. Porter decisively placed African-American artists within the framework of American art. He was the first to recognize and document the significant contributions these artists made to the history of American art. With Porter's systematic approach, Modern Negro Art became and still is the foundation of African-American art history and for later texts. Porter's interest in nearly forgotten and often ignored artists of African descent was sparked by reading a brief article on African-American landscape artist Robert Scott Duncanson. Due to the account's brevity, Porter followed his curiosity to research Duncanson and other artists of African descent.

Porter was the recipient of a grant from the Rockefeller Foundation in 1945. He took a leave of absence from teaching and spent a year in Cuba from 1945 to 1946, studying art and culture in Cuba and Haiti. In Haiti, Porter's subjects included the peasant class and landscapes of the country. While his work in Haiti focused on similar subjects as other Black artists who turned to Haiti for inspiration, such as William E. Scott and Aaron Douglas, his approach to the subject matter differed. He did not paint his Haitian subjects as simply picturesque and created monumental figures of the "market women" he saw. Porter's paintings and writing encouraged Americans to resist the urge upon traveling to Haiti and getting lost in the picturesque quality it holds on the surface. In an essay Porter wrote in 1946 for Opportunity Magazine entitled "Picturesque Haiti" he wrote, "It is altogether too easy to make the aesthetic blunder so easily made in the presence of the new and the strange, that is, to say of Haitian life or landscape, 'Oh, how picturesque!' " While his paintings made in Haiti showcased the same characters as other artists at the time he surrounded this figures not with the bounty of an imagined tropical island but with urban debris. The representation of economic pressures and struggles that shaped the world of the Haitians he painted separates his work from other artists inspired by Haiti before him. His thorough research on Haiti, Cuba, and West Africa stimulated his creating courses at Howard in "Latin American Art" and "African Art and Architecture". In 1955, he was awarded a fellowship by the Belgium-American Art Seminar and studied Flemish and Dutch Art of the 16th to the 18th century while in Belgium. With a grant from the newspaper, the Evening Star, Porter traveled to South Africa in 1963 to study West African architecture. He completed 25 paintings with South African themes during his time in the country.

Porter's work was shown in many group exhibitions during his forty-year career. In 1940, his work was displayed at the American Negro Exposition in Chicago, and in 1948, he mounted a one-man exhibition of his work with the Barnett-Aden Gallery in Washington, D.C.

== Personal life ==
During his studies, Porter met Dorothy Burnett, a librarian at the Harlem branch of the New York Public Library, where he did research. On December 27, 1929, Porter and Burnett were married. They had one daughter, Constance Porter. The couple became professional as well as personal partners. Dorothy worked with Porter, providing bibliographic information critical to his investigations. Both worked at Howard University. Dorothy Porter was the director of the Moorland Foundation, later known as the Moorland-Spingarn Research Center. She developed and catalogued information about African-American artists.

== Honors and legacy ==
James A. Porter left a cultural and educational legacy to those passionately involved in the area of African American art. The drive to explore and firmly document artists of the Diaspora continues today. Porter's artistic and historical work provides a solid foundation in which current and future scholars can build upon. Many scholars owe Porter for the inspiration to probe the depths of African American visual culture and attest to its significance to American culture.

— Jefreen Hayes
- Recipient of the Schomburg Portrait Prize, from the Harmon Foundation, for the painting entitled Woman Holding a Jug (1930).
- Honored by President Lyndon Johnson, on the twenty-fifth anniversary of the founding of the National Gallery of Art as one of America's most outstanding men of the arts.
- In 1990, Howard University professor Floyd C. Coleman created the James A. Porter Colloquium on African American Art to honor Porter for his career as an art professor, art department chair, and university art gallery director. The Porter Colloquium annually attracts art historians, artists, curators, collectors, and art dealers in the field of African American Art. Presenters have included former Porter students, such as David Driskell and Tritobia Hayes Benjamin, and other important scholars and artists, such as Michael D. Harris, Samella Lewis, Richard A. Long, Lowery Stokes Sims, Richard J. Powell, Deborah Willis, and Judith Wilson-Pates.

On February 25, 2010, Swann Galleries auctioned an immense archive of research material amassed by Porter; it consisted of photographs, letters, exhibit catalogues, art books, flyers, and bibliographical data on important African-American artists. Acquired by Emory University, the papers include correspondence from virtually every major African-American artist from the 1920s forward: Romare Bearden, Lois Mailou Jones, Meta Fuller, Elizabeth Catlett, Hughie Lee-Smith, and many others.
