= Howard Dodson =

American scholar (born 1939)

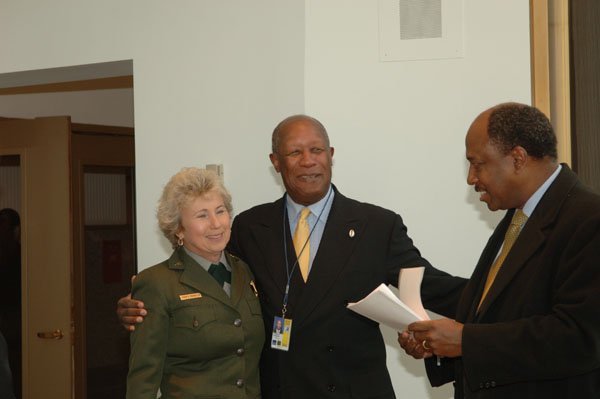
- Dodson (center), alongside National Park Service Director Fran P. Mainella (left) and Deputy Director Don Murphy (right) in 2006
- Born: June 6, 1939 (age 87); U.S.
- Education: West Chester State College; Villanova University
- Occupation: Scholar
- Known for: Director of the Schomburg Center for Research in Black Culture (1984–2010)

Howard Dodson Jr. (born June 6, 1939) is an American scholar who was the Director of the Moorland-Spingarn Research Center and Howard University Libraries, and was formerly the long-time director of the Schomburg Center for Research in Black Culture in Harlem, which post he occupied for more than a quarter of a century (1984–2010).

== Biography ==
Dodson grew up in Chester, Pennsylvania, where his family had moved from Virginia. His parents worked blue-collar jobs in construction and textiles. He attended West Chester State College (now West Chester University), and then earned a master's degree in history and political science at Villanova. In 1964, he joined the Peace Corps and spent two years in Ecuador. In 1968, believing he had responsibilities in the United States during the civil rights movement, he returned, stopping in Puerto Rico for a period of reflection and then going to Berkeley to study slavery in the Western Hemisphere. From 1974 to 1979, he worked as the executive director of the Atlanta-based Institute of the Black World, in addition to teaching classes at Emory University. Dodson was later a consultant to the National Endowment for the Humanities (NEH) until 1984.

Dodson took on the directorship of the Schomburg Center for Research in Black Culture in 1984 and had a successful tenure, during which he increased the center's holdings of historical artifacts—many of them rare and irreplaceable—from 5 to 10 million, curated numerous displays and exhibitions, and raised millions of dollars in support. One high point was his intimate involvement in the African Burial Ground project, through which the remains of hundreds of former slaves buried in Manhattan during the 17th and 18th centuries were exhumed and reburied.

After retirement from the Schomburg Center in 2010, Dodson took on a position as director of Howard University's library system, which includes the undergraduate and graduate libraries, and the Moorland-Spingarn Research Center (MSRC).

== Published works ==
- 1984: Censorship and Black America, An Exhibition in the Schomburg Center for Research in Black Culture : July 19-October 15, 1984. New York: New York Public Library.
- 1993: A Public Forum on the Draft Proposal to the U.S. Congress for Commemorating the African Burial Ground. New York: S & S Reporting Co. Inc.
- 2000: The Black New Yorkers: The Schomburg Illustrated Chronology. New York: John Wiley. ISBN 0-471-40173-0
- 2002: Jubilee: The Emergence of African-American Culture. Washington, D.C.: National Geographic Books ISBN 0-7922-6982-9
- 2004: In Motion: The African-American Migration Experience. Washington, D.C.: National Geographic Society ISBN 978-0-7922-7385-1
- 2007: Lest We Forget: The Triumph over Slavery. San Francisco: Pomegranate. ISBN 978-0-7649-4037-8
- 2007: Ideology, Identity and Assumptions. New York: New York Public Library. ISBN 978-0-87013-795-2
- 2007 (with Palmer, Colin A.): Cultural Life. East Lansing: Michigan State University Press. ISBN 978-0-87013-808-9
- 2008 (with Palmer, Colin A.): Origins. New York: New York Public Library. ISBN 978-0-87013-817-1
- 2009 (with Palmer, Colin A.): The Black Condition. East Lansing: Michigan State University Press. ISBN 978-0-87013-838-6
- 2009: Becoming American: The African-American Journey. New York: Sterling Pub. Co. ISBN 978-1-4027-5407-4
