= Black Classic Press =

Book publishing company, founded by W. Paul Coates in 1978

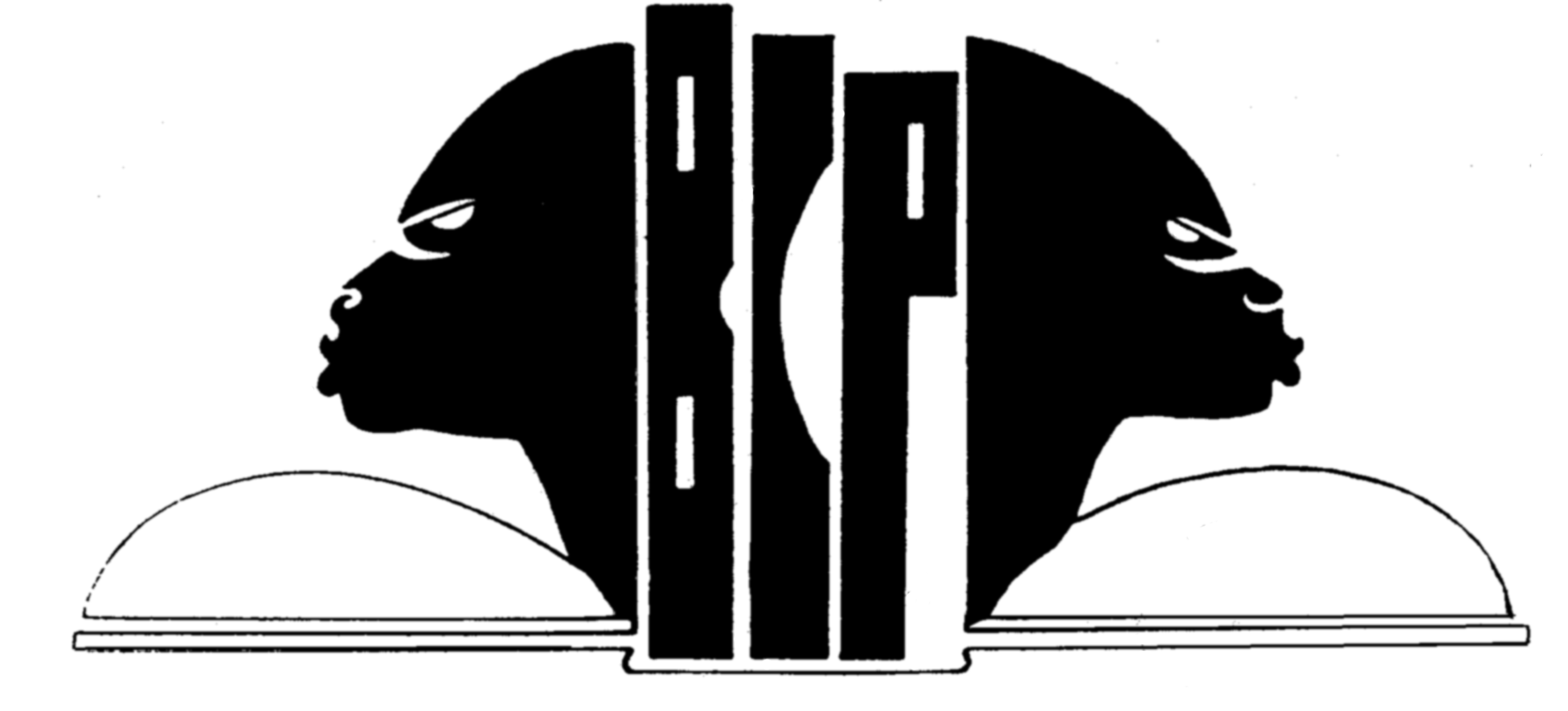
- Parent company: Black Classic Press
- Status: Active
- Founded: 1978; 48 years ago
- Founder: W. Paul Coates
- Country of origin: United States
- Headquarters location: Baltimore, Maryland, United States
- Distribution: Publishers Group West
- Fiction genres: Non-fiction and fiction
- Imprints: Black Classic Press; W.M. DuForcelf; INPRINT EDITIONS
- Official website: blackclassicbooks.com

Black Classic Press (BCP) is an African-American book publishing company, founded by W. Paul Coates in 1978. Since then, BCP has published original titles by notable authors including Walter Mosley, John Henrik Clarke, E. Ethelbert Miller, Yosef Ben-Jochannan, and Dorothy B. Porter, as well as reissuing significant works by Tony Martin, Amiri Baraka, Larry Neal, W. E. B. Du Bois, Edward Blyden, J. E. Casely Hayford, Bobby Seale, J. A. Rogers, and others.

An affiliated company is BCP Digital Printing, established in 1995 to serve as the printer for Black Classic Press as well as for other companies and organizations.

== History ==
W. Paul Coates (father of Ta-Nehisi Coates) founded Black Classic Press in 1978 in Baltimore, Maryland, originally working from the basement of his house. The company is one of the oldest independently owned Black publishers in operation in the United States.

The primary mission of the press is to publish obscure and significant books by and about people of African descent. John G. Jackson, John Henrik Clarke, and Yosef Ben-Jochannan were major influences in defining the mission and early direction of the press. The company publishes about six titles annually; most are out-of-print historical books that the company brings back into print.

=== Printing ===
The first books published by the company were pamphlets printed on a photocopier that Coates purchased. In the same vein, he established BCP Digital Printing in 1995 as an affiliated company of Black Classic Press. The printing company, a million-dollar business, serves as the printer for the publishing company as well as for other companies and organizations in the Baltimore–Washington metropolitan area, and is the only Black-owned printing company in the US.

== Imprints ==
Black Classic Press has three imprints:

- Black Classic Press: Historical reprints that deal with the African diaspora
- W.M. DuForcelf: Currently defunct since 1994, a statement and a call for self-sufficiency in the African-American community
- INPRINT EDITIONS: Serves academic books and titles that fall outside the primary mission of Black Classic Press list

== Notable authors and titles ==
=== Walter Mosley ===
The press gained national attention in 1996 when best-selling author Walter Mosley chose Black Classic Press to publish Gone Fishin′ (1997), the prequel to his popular Easy Rawlins mysteries. Mosley decided to publish a book with a small Black publishing house because he felt it was important "to create a model that other writers, black or not, can look at to see that it's possible to publish a book successfully outside mainstream publishing in New York." The result was so successful that in 2003 the press collaborated again with Mosley to publish What Next: An African American Initiative Toward World Peace (2003), part memoir and part call to action for African Americans after the September 11, 2001 attacks in the United States. The Tempest Tales (2008), Mosley's homage to Langston Hughes' character Jesse B. Semple, was the third collaboration between Mosley and Black Classic Press.

- Gone Fishin': An Easy Rawlins Novel. Baltimore, MD: Black Classic Press, 1997. ISBN 978-1-574-78025-3, OCLC 36164865
- What Next: An African American Initiative Toward World Peace. Baltimore, MD: Black Classic Press, 2003. ISBN 978-1-574-78020-8, OCLC 316901591
- The Tempest Tales. Baltimore, MD: Black Classic Press, 2008. ISBN 978-1-574-78043-7 OCLC 762313150

=== Selected other publications ===
- Baraka, Amiri, and Larry Neal. Black Fire: An Anthology of Afro-American Writing. Baltimore, MD: Black Classic Press, 2007. ISBN 978-1-574-78039-0 OCLC 608062892. Originally published: New York: Morrow, 1968.
- Baldwin, Neil. To All Gentleness: William Carlos Williams, the Doctor Poet. Baltimore: Imprint Editions/Black Classic Press, 2008. ISBN 978-1-580-73038-9, OCLC 179787454
- Ben-Jochannan, Yosef
  - A Chronology of the Bible [1972] (1996)
  - We the Black Jews (1996)
  - Africa: Mother of Western Civilization (1988)
  - Cultural Genocide in the Black and African Studies Curriculum (2004)
  - African Origins of the Major "Western Religions" [1970] (1991)
  - Black Man of the Nile [1972] (1989)
  - Understanding the African Philosophical Concept Behind the "Diagram of the Law of Opposites" (2005)
  - Our Black Seminarians and Black Clergy Without a Black Theology (1996)
  - The Need for a Black Bible (1996)
  - The Black Man's North and East Africa (2005)
  - The Myth of Genesis and Exodus (1991)
- Blyden, Edward Wilmot. Christianity, Islam and the Negro Race. Baltimore, MD: Black Classic Press, 1994. ISBN 978-0-933-12141-6 OCLC 30627022, 2nd edition. Originally published 1888.
- Casely Hayford, J. Ethiopia Unbound (2010). Originally published in 1911.
- Du Bois, W. E. B. The Negro. Baltimore, MD: Black Classic Press, 2005. ISBN 978-1-580-73032-7, OCLC 156994177. Originally published in 1915.
- Ginzburg, Ralph. 100 Years of Lynchings. Baltimore, MD: Black Classic Press, 1988. ISBN 978-0-933-12118-8, OCLC 716335685. Originally published: New York: Lancer Books, 1962.
- Jones, Charles E. The Black Panther Party (Reconsidered). Baltimore, MD: Black Classic Press, 1998. ISBN 978-0-933-12196-6, OCLC 39228699
- Lewis, Reginald F., and Blair S. Walker. Why Should White Guys Have All the Fun?: How Reginald Lewis Created a Billion-Dollar Business Empire. Baltimore, MD: Black Classic Press, 2012. ISBN 978-1-574-78050-5, OCLC 823107253. Commemorative edition with DVD. Originally published in 2005.
- Miller, E. Ethelbert
  - First Light (1994)
  - Whispers, Secrets and Promises (1998)
  - Beyond the Frontier: African American Poetry for the 21st Century (ed.; 2002)
- Porter, Dorothy (with Constance Porter Uzelac, eds)
  - Early Negro Writing, 1760-1837 (1995)
  - William Cooper Nell: Selected Writings, 1832-1874 (2002)
- Rogers, J. A.
  - Your History: From the Beginning of Time to the Present [1940] (1983)
  - As Nature Leads [1919] (1987)
- Seale, Bobby. Seize the Time: The Story of the Black Panther Party and Huey P. Newton. Baltimore, MD: Black Classic Press, 1991. ISBN 978-0-933-12130-0 OCLC 24636234. Originally published New York: Random House, 1970.
- Walker, David, and James Turner. David Walker's Appeal, in Four Articles: Together with a Preamble, to the Coloured Citizens of the World, but in Particular, and Very Expressly, to Those of the United States of America: Third and Last Edition, Revised and Published by David Walker, 1830. Baltimore, MD: Black Classic Press, 1993. ISBN 978-0-933-12138-6, OCLC 28541963

== See also ==
- African-American book publishers in the United States, 1960–80
- Africa World Press
- Just Us Books
