= Ahmos Zu-Bolton =

American poet

Ahmos Zu-Bolton II
- Born: October 21, 1948; Poplarville, Mississippi, U.S.
- Died: March 8, 2005 (aged 56); Washington, D.C., U.S.
- Education: Louisiana State University
- Occupations: Poet; playwright; activist; editor; publisher; educator; bookseller
- Writing career
- Genres: Poetry; drama

Ahmos Zu-Bolton II (October 21, 1948 – March 8, 2005) was an activist, poet, and playwright also known for his editing and publishing endeavors focused on African-American culture.

Zu-Bolton's work was associated with the Black Arts Movement and with African-American literary activity in Louisiana, Washington, D.C., and Texas. He founded the literary magazine HooDoo, and then HooDoo Festivals that gathered writers from across the South.

== Life ==
Born in Poplarville, Mississippi, Zu-Bolton grew up in DeRidder, Louisiana, near the Texas border. In 1965 he was one of several black students who integrated Louisiana State University in Baton Rouge. After serving in the United Staets Army in Vietnam, Zu-Bolton founded HooDoo, a magazine devoted to African-American activism and arts, published A Niggered Amen: Poems, and coedited Synergy D.C. Anthology in 1975. Zu-Bolton participated in the first Southern Black Poetry Festival at Southern University in Baton Rouge on May 3, 1972, along with poets including Haki R. Madhubuti, Margaret Danner, Jerry W. Ward Jr., Pinkie Gordon Lane, and Kalamu ya Salaam. He also opened the Copestetic Bookstore on Marigny Street in New Orleans. HooDoo later relocated to Galveston, Texas, where he organized HooDoo Festivals in the late 1970s.

While living in New Orleans he taught English, African-American studies, and creative writing classes at Xavier University, Tulane University and Delgado Community College. He was Visiting Writer-in-Residence at University of Missouri.

== Work ==
Zu-Bolton's poetry and storytelling was about African-American oral traditions in Louisiana. He attributes it to the learned stories from his family members during front porch storytelling sessions.

His books include A Niggered Amen: Poems, Ain't No Spring Chicken, and 1946: A Poem. He also wrote plays, including The Widow Paris: A Folklore of Marie Laveau, The Funeral, Family Reunion, and The Break-In.

== Death ==
Ahmos Zu-Bolton died of cancer on March 8, 2005 in Washington, D.C.

== Archives and papers ==
Materials related to Zu-Bolton are held in the Jerry Washington Ward collection at the Mississippi Department of Archives and History. The collection includes manuscripts, poems, an interview of Zu-Bolton by Ward, flyers, newsletters, and pamphlets, dated from 1976 to 1995.

A 1990 letter from Zu-Bolton to Storyteller is also listed in the Augusta Baker papers, held by the University of South Carolina Libraries and indexed through the Civil Rights Digital Library.

== Bibliography ==
- Zu-Bolton, Ahmos (1975), A niggered amen: poems / by Ahmos Zu-Bolton II, Solo Press
- Zu-Bolton, Ahmos; Miller, E. Ethelbert (1975), Synergy D.C. Anthology, Energy BlackSouth Press
- Thomas, Lorenzo; Alakoye, Adesanya; Zu-Bolton, Ahmos (1978), Hoo-doo 6½, Energy Earth Communications
- Blue Cloud, Peter; Oandasan, William; Zu-Bolton, Ahmos; Sánchez, Ricardo (1979), "Featuring four third world poets", A: A Journal of Contemporary Literature, 4 (1), A Press
- Zu-Bolton, Ahmos (1992), "The governor of Ollie Street; By the 5th generation", in Killens, John Oliver; Ward, Jerry W. (eds.), Black Southern Voices: An Anthology of Fiction, Poetry, Drama, Nonfiction, and Critical Essays, Plume, ISBN 9780452265875
- Zu-Bolton, Ahmos (1998), Ain't No Spring Chicken: Selected Poems, The Incorporated Voice Foundation, ISBN 978-0-9668063-0-4
- Zu-Bolton, Ahmos (2002), 1946: a poem, Ishmael Reed, ISBN 978-0-918408-34-1
