= Cynthia Macdonald =

American poet

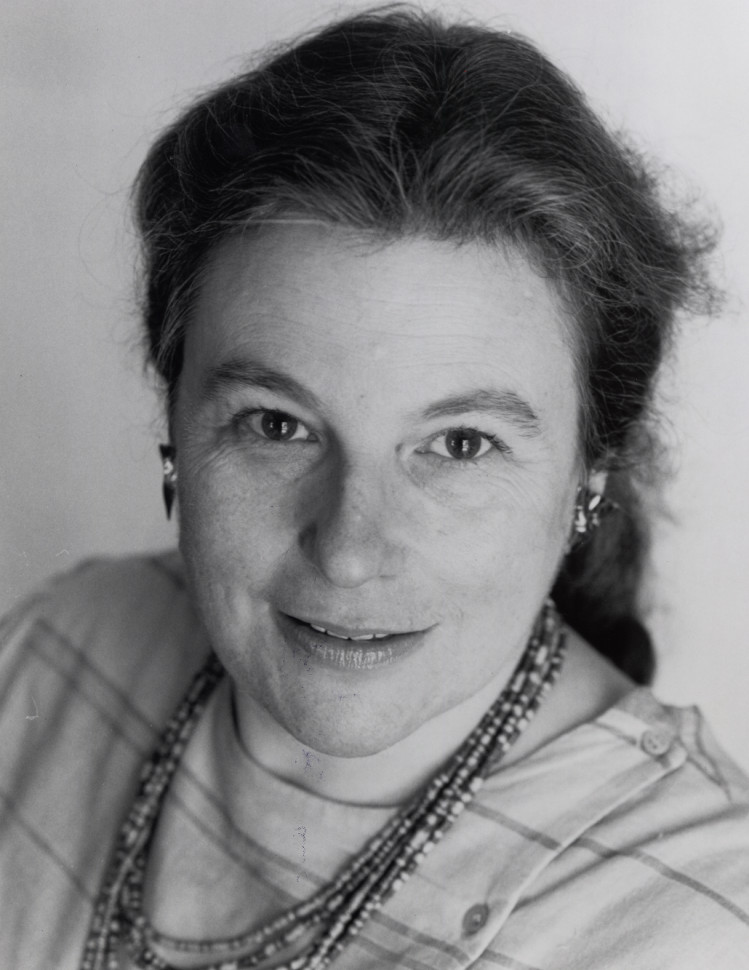
- Macdonald in 1979
- Born: Cynthia Lee Macdonald; February 2, 1928
- Died: August 3, 2015 (aged 87)
- Education: Bennington College; Sarah Lawrence College
- Occupations: Poet; educator
- Children: Jennifer Macdonald
- Writing career
- Notable awards: Guggenheim Fellowship 1983 in poetry; O. B. Hardison Jr. Prize 1992

Cynthia Lee Macdonald (February 2, 1928 – August 3, 2015) was an American poet, educator, and psychoanalyst.

== Life ==
Macdonald was born in Manhattan to screenwriter Leonard Lee and his wife Dorothy Kiam.

She earned a B.A. in English from Bennington College in 1950 and pursued studies in voice at the Mannes School of Music in 1951-1952. She pursued a career in opera and concert singing from 1953-1966. After changing her focus to poetry, Macdonald received a master's degree in writing and literature from Sarah Lawrence College.

She went on to teach creative writing at Sarah Lawrence University and Johns Hopkins University. She co-founded the Creative Writing Program at the University of Houston with fellow poet Stanley Plumly in 1979. She was a member of the English Department at the University of Houston until her retirement in 2004, receiving the Esther Farfel Award for faculty excellence.

Macdonald also worked as a psychoanalyst, having received a certification from the Houston-Galveston Psychoanalytic Institute in 1986. She specialized in working with people who had writer's block.

She was a member of the board of directors of the Association of Writers & Writing Programs.

She wrote the libretto for The Rehearsal (1978), an opera by Thomas Benjamin.

She was the mother of American artist Jennifer Macdonald.

== Awards ==
- Three NEA grants (two for poetry and one for a libretto)
- 1977 National Academy and Institute of Arts and Letters award "for "recognition of the contribution of her poetry", 1977
- 1983 Guggenheim Fellowship in Poetry
- 1992 O. B. Hardison, Jr. Poetry Prize

== Works ==
- "Discomfiting the Absolute Splendor", Poetry Foundation
- "The Impossible May Be Possible", Ploughshares (Spring 1999)

=== Books ===
- Amputations: Poems. George Braziller. 1972. ISBN 0-8076-0656-1.
- Transplants: Poems. George Braziller. 1977. ISBN 0-8076-0810-6.
- (W)Holes. NY: Alfred A. Knopf Incorporated. 1980. ISBN 0-394-50852-1.
- Alternate Means of Transport. Knopf. 1985. ISBN 0-394-72968-4.
- Living Wills: New and Selected Poems. Knopf. 1992. ISBN 0-679-74278-6.
- I Can't Remember. Alfred a Knopf Inc. 1997. ISBN 0-679-45457-8.
