= Fred Eversley =

American sculptor (1941–2025)

- Born: August 28, 1941; New York City, U.S.
- Died: March 14, 2025 (aged 83); New York City, U.S.
- Education: Carnegie Institute of Technology
- Known for: Sculptor
- Movement: Light and Space
- Spouse: Maria Larsson
- Website: https://www.fredeversley.com/

Frederick John Eversley (August 28, 1941 – March 14, 2025) was an American sculptor who lived in SoHo, New York, and for many years, as a Venice Beach resident, was associated with the California Light and Space movement. His parabolic resin sculptures have been exhibited in more than 200 galleries and museums worldwide.

== Background ==
Eversley was born on August 28, 1941, in New York City and raised in the East New York section of Brooklyn. His father, Frederick W. Eversley Jr., born in Christ Church, Barbados, was a civil engineer at Republic Aviation for more than 20 years, and the founder of a Black-owned construction business that played a key role in building the New York State Office Building in Harlem, a Rockefeller University faculty residential tower, the Bronx Zoo World of Darkness building, and numerous multi-family housing projects. His mother, Beatrice Syphax Eversley, a school teacher and PTA leader, traced her ancestry to both the Syphax family, prominent African-Americans who arose from slavery in Northern Virginia, and the Shinnecock Indian Nation of Suffolk County, New York.The eldest of four children, Eversley had one sister, Rani, and two brothers, Donald and Thomas.

Eversley was first attracted to the parabola form as child reading about Isaac Newton and his experiments. He tinkered in his father's electronics basement workshop, playing with his grandfather's radio and photography equipment to emulate scientific theories. Eversley graduated from Brooklyn Technical High School in 1959, and worked at Izzy Young’s Folklore Center in Greenwich Village with Marcia Silverman Tucker, who would be responsible years later for giving Eversley his first art show in New York. Eversley attended Carnegie Institute of Technology (later renamed Carnegie Mellon University), where he majored in electrical engineering and was the only Black engineering student. He did not take one art class at Carnegie Mellon. In 2023, Eversley received an Honorary Doctor of Fine Arts degree from Carnegie Mellon.

Eversley died at a hospital in Manhattan after a brief illness on March 14, 2025, at the age of 83.

== Career ==
From 1963 to 1967, Eversley worked as an engineer at Wyle Laboratories, where he was part of the team that designed high intensity acoustic laboratories for the Apollo and Gemini missions for NASA in Houston, and acoustic laboratories for the European Space Agency in Munich.

He moved to Venice, California, in 1964, where he would live for more than 50 years.

In 1967, he retired from engineering to become a full-time artist after a down-the-hill car accident almost cost him his life; he broke a femur bone and had to walk on crutches for more than one year. While he was recovering, he started making his own art pieces.

In 1969, Eversley assumed John Altoon's Venice studio that Frank Gehry converted from a laundromat into a live-work space. John McCracken (artist) and Charles Mattox, were his neighbors, as well as other artists including Los Angeles artists, including DeWain Valentine, Larry Bell, Robert Irwin,and James Turrell.

In 1977, Eversley was nominated and selected as the first artist in residence of the Smithsonian's National Air and Space Museum. As part of his three-year residency, he was given a large studio workspace in the museum's basement and a living space at Barney Studio House (now the Latvian Embassy). Sam Gilliam was one of his neighbors. In Washington, D.C., Eversley had shows at the American Institute of Architects headquarters, the Federal Reserve Bank, and the National Academy of Sciences.

In 1980, Eversley purchased a five-story, cast iron building in SoHo as an investment. In 2019, he was forced out of his Venice studio and moved back to New York City, where he lived with his artist wife, Maria Larsson.

== Artworks ==
Eversley was a pioneer among Black abstractionists and created sculptures from cast resin and other materials. He referred to his process as “centrifrugal casting,” where he used a mold instead of his hands to shape the sculpture's form into a parabola. His work focused on the use of space and light, connecting people through positive energy spaces, and working with the Earth's natural resources to create art. He used basic geometric forms to play with light refraction and incorporates parabolic curves to evoke thick lens and mirror images. In the 1970s, Eversley was considered to be a part of the California Light and Space movement.

Eversley sold his first major work to the National Museum of American Art, to be included in an international traveling show.

His work appears in the permanent collections of more than 40 museums around the world, including Crystal Bridges Museum, Solomon R. Guggenheim Museum , K11 Art Foundation in Hong Kong, Los Angeles County Museum of Art, Milwaukee Art Museum, Museum of Modern Art in New York, Oakland Museum of California, Orange County Museum of Art, Palm Springs Art Museum, Rose Art Museum, San Francisco International Airport Museum, Smithsonian American Art Museum, Smithsonian National Air and Space Museum, Tate Modern, and Whitney Museum of American Art, as well as prominent private collections including of Michael Dell, and Raymond J. McGuire.

== Select Solo Exhibitions ==
- "Fred Eversley: Recent Sculpture", Whitney Museum of American Art (1970)
- "Fred Eversley." Santa Barbara Museum of Art. 1976.
- "Fred Eversley." Oakland Museum of California. 1977.
- "Fred Eversley." Palm Springs Museum of Art. 1978.
- "Fred Eversley." National Academy of Sciences. 1981.
- "Black, White, Gray." Art + Practice, Los Angeles, California. 2016.
- "Fred Eversley: Black, White, Gray," The Rose Art Museum, Brandeis University. 2017.
- "Fred Eversley: 50 Years an Artist, Light & Space & Energy," Muscarelle Museum of Art, 2017.
- "Fred Eversley: Reflecting Back (the World)," Orange County Museum of Art. 2022.
- "Cylindrical Lenses,” David Kordansky Gallery, New York. 2024.
- "Parabolic Light," Doris Freedman Plaza, Central Park, New York. 2024.

== Select Group Exhibitions ==
- "Contemporary American Sculpture." Whitney Museum. 1970.
- "Contemporary American Art." Whitney Biennial. Whitney Museum. 1973.
- “Greetings from LA: Artists and Publics 1945-1980, Pacific Standard Time: Crosscurrents in L.A. Painting and Sculpture, 1950-1970”, Getty Center, Los Angeles, CA, 2011
- *Now Dig This! Art and Black Los Angeles, 1960-1980, Hammer Museum, Los Angeles, CA, 2011
- "African American Art: Harlem Renaissance, Civil Rights Era, and Beyond," Muscarelle Museum of Art, 2012.
- “DYNAMO, A century of light and movement in art 1913-2013”, Grand Palais, Paris, France, 2013
- “Space Shifters”, Hayward Gallery, London, England, 2018
- “Soul of A Nation: Art in the Age of Black Power”, Brooklyn Museum, Brooklyn, NY, 2018, “Soul of a Nation: Art in the Age of Black Power”, The Broad, Los Angeles, CA; "Soul of a Nation: Art in the Age of Black Power", de Young Museum, San Francisco, CA, 2019
- “Light, Space, Surface: Works from the Los Angeles County Museum of Art,” Addison Gallery of American Art, 2022.
- "The Dynamic Eye: Beyond Optical and Kinetic Art", Atkinson Museum, Vila Nova de Gaia, Portugal, 2023
- “Particles and Waves: Southern California Abstraction and Science, 1945–1990,” Palm Springs Art Museum, 2024.
- "Flight into Egypt: Black Artists and Ancient Egypt, 1876–Now", Metropolitan Museum of Art, New York, NY, 2024
- "Lumen: The Art and Science of Light", J Paul Getty Museum for PST ART: Art & Science Collide, Los Angeles, CA, 2024
- “Other Octaves: Curated by Jennie C. Jones”, Pulitzer Arts Foundation, St. Louis 2025-26
- “Artist’s Choice Arthur Jafa—Less Is Morbid”, MoMA, New York, 2025-26

== Awards and honors ==
- Honorary Doctor of Fine Arts degree, Carnegie Mellon University. 2023.
- Lifetime Achievement Award in Three-Dimensional Art, James A. Porter Colloquium on African American Art, Howard University, 2018.
- Artist of The Year Award, LA Artcore, Los Angeles, California, 2010.
- City of Florence Award, Biennale Internazionale Dell'arte Contemporanea Florence, Italy, 2003.
- First Prize – Sculpture, Biennale Internazionale Dell'arte Contemporanea Florence, Italy, 2001.
- First Artist in Residence, Smithsonian Institution's National Air and Space Museum, Washington, D.C., 1977–1980.
- Individual Artist Fellowship Grant, National Endowment for the Arts, Washington, D.C., 1972.
