= Africa World Press =

Publishing company based in New Jersey, US

Africa World Press / The Red Sea Press
- Parent company: Africa World Press, Inc.
- Status: Active
- Founded: 1983; 43 years ago
- Founder: Kassahun Checole
- Headquarters location: Trenton, New Jersey, U.S.
- Imprints: Africa World Press; The Red Sea Press
- Official website: africaworldpressbooks.com

Africa World Press (AWP) is a publishing company founded in 1983 by Kassahun Checole in Trenton, New Jersey, United States, with a mission to publish books on the history, culture and politics of Africa and the African diaspora. Two years later, The Red Sea Press was added as an imprint of AWP, with a primary focus on the Horn of Africa, and taking on the role of distributor for books on and about Africa and people of African descent in the continent as well as the diaspora.

== Background and output ==
The president and publisher of Africa World Press and The Red Sea Press is Kassahun Checole, who grew up in Eritrea. He attended Haile Selassie University, and in 1971 went to further his education at the State University of New York at Binghamton (SUNY Binghampton), where he developed his interest in Pan-African movements; after earning an undergraduate degree in political science and African-American studies and his master's in sociology, he took up a position as a professor of sociology and African studies at Rutgers University. He also taught courses at other higher education institutions, including El Colegio de Mexico and the University of Johannesburg, and realised early in his teaching career that there was a dearth of relevant books dealing with African and African-American issues, and that whatever material was produced was not reaching its market.

Aiming to address this deficiency, in 1983 Checocle began producing books from his home, an early title being Ngugi Wa Thiong'o's Barrel of a Pen. Other notable titles from the 1980s include Under a Soprano Sky by Sonia Sanchez and Afrocentricity by Molefi Asante. Distribution proved to be a problem, however, as Checole noted in a 2019 interview: "I couldn’t find anyone who would carry my books. The traditional distributors in the United States were sympathetic, but they were not willing to carry black books in a significant way or promote them in a significant way. I was being told again and again that it’s good to publish black books, but there’s no buyers. So I had to disprove that notion. And in 1985, I began distributing not only my own books, but the books by other black publishers in the United States and around the world."

In 1985, Checole founded the Red Sea Press, as a sister imprint of AWP with a primary focus on the Horn of Africa, and Red Sea Press handled distribution of the titles he published, as well as books from other Black publishers.Checole has said: "There was no one doing what I was at the time. Traditional black publishers like Third World Press in Boston were very focused. My goal was more ambitious and perhaps foolish. I wanted to reach the widest spectrum of people I could."

Among the notable authors published by Checole are Bereket Habte Selassie, Basil Davidson, and many others.

Publishing a wide variety of titles on the history, culture and politics of Africa and the African diaspora, including some fiction, AWP/Red Sea Press now produces about 100 titles annually, with a focus on academic and library markets as well as international sales.

== See also ==
- Black Classic Press
