= Hillary Leone =

American artist

- Born: 1962 (age 63–64); Miami, FL
- Education: Brown University, California Institute of the Arts
- Known for: installation, sculpture, video art, photography, digital art, writing

Hillary Leone (born 1962) is an American conceptual artist who works across installation, sculpture, video, photography, digital, and writing mediums. Her work has focused on the intersection of art, science, and technology.

Leone collaborated with Jennifer Macdonald under the name of Leone & Macdonald for over a decade. Their collaborative work was distinguished for its poetic use of materials to address charged contemporary issues. They were among the first female collaborative artist pairs in the United States and among the first women to address AIDS directly in their work. Their work was featured in the 1993 Whitney Biennial and is in the Whitney Museum's permanent collection.

Leone expanded into digital media in 2000, founding the creative studio, Cabengo. Leone directed Supreme Decision, one of the first online civics games developed for Retired Supreme Court Justice Sandra Day O'Connor's iCivics initiative. Her digital work for Colección Patricia Phelps de Cisneros, the Smithsonian Museum, and Contemporary Jewish Museum earned recognition from the Webby Awards, South by Southwest, MuseWeb, and Applied Arts. Other projects include directing the redesign of the Harvard Graduate School of Design website.

Leone received monies from 2030 Visions to develop Synch.Live, an art experience examining human cooperation. Leone & Macdonald are two-time National Endowment for the Arts grant, three-time Art Matters Foundation Fellowship, Penny McCall Foundation grant, and the Joan Mitchell Foundation grant recipients, among others.

Leone was an adjunct professor at the Rhode Island School of Design and the University of California, San Diego. She was a visiting artist at the Massachusetts Institute of Technology, Columbia University, Cooper Union, Brown University, School of the Art Institute of Chicago, and others.

== Early life and education ==
Hillary Leone was born in 1962 in Miami, FL. Leone earned an AB in Semiotics and English and American Literature from Brown University in 1985 and a BFA in Art from California Institute of the Arts in 1986. She completed The Whitney Museum of American Art Independent Study Program in Studio Art in 1989.

== Selected exhibitions ==
- 1999 North Dakota Museum of Art, Grand Forks, ND
- 1999 Henry Art Gallery, Faye G. Allen Center for the Visual Arts, Seattle (Solo)
- 1998 Contemporary Arts Museum, Houston
- 1997 The Australian Center for Photography, Sydney, Australia (Solo)
- 1997 Hallwalls, Buffalo, NY
- 1997 Rena Bransten Gallery, San Francisco (Solo)
- 1997 Monash University Gallery, Melbourne
- 1996 Arthouse Multimedia Centre for the Arts, Dublin, Ireland (Solo)
- 1996 Wolfson Galleries, Miami Dade Community College, Miami, FL (Solo)
- 1996 Crawford Municipal Art Gallery, Cork, Ireland (Solo)
- 1996 David Winton Bell Gallery, List Art Center, Brown University
- 1995 Fawbush Gallery, New York (Solo)
- 1994 Whitney Museum of American Art at Altria, New York (Solo)
- 1994 Fogg Art Museum, Harvard University, Cambridge
- 1994 Snug Harbor Cultural Center, New York
- 1994 Paris Review (Portfolio)
- 1993 Whitney Biennial 1993, Whitney Museum of American Art
- 1993 National Museum of Modern and Contemporary Art, Seoul, Korea
- 1993 Aspen Art Museum, Aspen
- 1992 Fawbush Gallery, New York (Solo)
- 1992 The School of the Art Institute of Chicago, Chicago
- 1991 MoMA PS1, New York
- 1991 Pence Gallery, Los Angeles
- 1990 Real Art Ways, Hartford, CT
- 1990 Los Angeles Contemporary Exhibitions (LACE)
- 1990 Gracie Mansion Gallery, New York (Solo)

== Written works ==
- Leone, H & Macdonald, J. (1996). Passing. Miami: Miami-Dade Community College.
- Leone, H & Macdonald, J. (1995). Questions of Feminism. October 71, MIT Press.
- Leone, H & Macdonald, J. (1992). Zone 6: Incorporations, MIT Press
