= O. B. Hardison Jr. Poetry Prize =

Poetry prize awarded by the Folger Shakespeare Library

The O.B. Hardison Jr. Poetry Prize was awarded by the Folger Shakespeare Library to honor a U.S. poet whose art and teaching demonstrated great imagination and daring. The poet must have published at least one book within the last five years, must have made important contributions as a teacher, and must be committed to furthering the understanding of poetry.

The prize is named after former Folger Library Director O.B. Hardison Jr. (1928–1990), who founded the Folger Poetry Series in 1970. Hardison Prize honorees received $10,000.

== Recipients ==
- 2009—Juliana Spahr
- 2008—Mary Kinzie
- 2007—David Wojahn
- 2006—David Rivard
- 2005—Tony Hoagland
- 2004—Reginald Gibbons
- 2003—Cornelius Eady
- 2002—Ellen Bryant Voigt
- 2001—David St. John
- 2000—Rachel Hadas
- 1999—Alan Shapiro
- 1998—Heather McHugh
- 1997—Frank Bidart
- 1996—Jorie Graham
- 1995—E. Ethelbert Miller
- 1994—R.H.W. Dillard
- 1993—John Frederick Nims
- 1992—Cynthia Macdonald
- 1991—Brendan Galvin

== See also ==
- American poetry
- List of poetry awards
- List of literary awards
- List of years in poetry
- List of years in literature
