= Curbstone Press =

American publishing house

- Parent company: Northwestern University Press
- Founded: 1975; 51 years ago
- Founders: Judith Doyle, Alexander "Sandy" Taylor
- Country of origin: United States
- Headquarters location: Evanston, Illinois
- Official website: nupress.northwestern.edu/content/curbstone-books

Curbstone Press was an American publishing company founded in 1975 in Willimantic, Connecticut by Judith Doyle and Alexander “Sandy” Taylor that specialized in fiction, creative nonfiction, memoir, and poetry that promote human rights, social justice, and intercultural understanding. Curbstone Press's backlist of 160 books was acquired by Northwestern University Press in 2010, where it continues as the Curbstone Books imprint.

== History ==
Doyle and Taylor met in the 1960s while students at the University of Connecticut. Doyle was an undergraduate in English literature, and Taylor was working on a PhD in literature, with a special interest in Scandinavian writing. “We were both pretty involved in the antiwar and Civil Rights movement,” Doyle said. A friendship based on their shared political activism developed into love, marriage, and the founding of the Curbstone Press, which "served as a model for activist literary publishing on the small press scene." Taylor stated that they founded Curbstone because they "wanted to present literature that promoted human rights and civil liberties and promoted cultural understanding."

They founded Curbstone in the basement of their home in Willimantic, CT in 1975 and continued in active operation through 2005. Authors published by Curbstone include Luis Rodríguez, Martín Espada, Claribel Alegria, Salah Al Hamdani, Ana Castillo, Wayne Karlin, E. Ethelbert Miller, Sergio Ramírez, and Le Clézio.

In 2001, Curbstone founded the Julia de Burgos Poetry Park at the south corner of Jackson Street and Terry Avenue near the Curbstone offices in honor of Puerto Rican poet and independence advocate Julia de Burgos García.

In acquiring the press in 2010, Northwestern University Press cited Curbstone's "emphasis on creative literature that promotes human rights and intercultural understanding," which complemented Northwestern's longstanding commitments to writing from underrepresented communities and literature in translation.

== Awards ==
Curbstone earned numerous national and regional awards, including the New England Booksellers Association for Publishing Excellence, the National Hispanic Academy of Media Arts and Sciences for Achievement in Publishing, the ALTA Award for Dedication to Translation, the PEN New England “Friends to Writers” Award, and the PEN Gregory Kolovakos Award for commitment to Hispanic Literature. Works published by Curbstone have won the ALTA Outstanding Translation of the Year Award, the American Book Award, the Critics Choice Award, Foreword’s Book of the Year Award, Independent Publishers Award, the Lambda Literary Award, the PEN/Oakland Award, the PEN/Revson Award, Premio Atzlán, and the Pushcart Prize.

In October 2020, the town council of Willimantic voted to memorialize the publishing house by renaming the street where the press was located "Curbstone Way."
