= Jennifer Macdonald =

American conceptual artist

- Born: Manhattan, New York
- Education: Brown University, The School of Visual Arts
- Known for: Conceptual Art

Jennifer T. Macdonald is an American conceptual artist whose work explores the artifices and tropes used in the construction of language and meaning at the intersection of law, gender identity, sexual orientation and desire.

Macdonald, together with partner Hillary Leone, worked under the collaborative name of Leone and Macdonald for slightly over a decade in the 1990s. Within the group of self-identified LGBT artists working in the American art scene, a number of gay male collaborative teams had established renown during this period, but Leone & Macdonald were arguably the first American lesbian art duo to do likewise. Known for their visually seductive but often politically pointed pieces, Leone & Macdonald were also among the first women to address AIDS directly in their work.

== Early life and career ==
Born in New York City, Jennifer Macdonald is the daughter of the American poet Cynthia Macdonald. Macdonald attended Brown University and graduated from The School of Visual Arts with honors before starting to collaborate with Leone in the late 1980s. Macdonald was an adjunct professor at Hunter College and a visiting professor at universities such as New York University, Massachusetts Institute of Technology, University of California at San Diego, Columbia University, and School of the Art Institute of Chicago. Leone & Macdonald are two-time National Endowments for the Arts grant recipients, three-time Art Matters Foundation Fellowship recipients, Penny McCall Foundation Grant and Joan Mitchell Foundation Grant recipients.

== Exhibitions (selection) ==
- 1999 Henry Art Gallery, Faye G. Allen Center for the Visual Arts, Seattle (solo retrospective)
- 1998 Whitney Museum of American Art, New York
- 1998 The Andy Warhol Museum, Pittsburgh
- 1998 Contemporary Arts Museum, Houston
- 1997 The Australian Center for Photography, Sydney, Australia (solo)
- 1997 Rena Bransten Gallery, San Francisco (solo)
- 1997 Monash University Gallery, Melbourne
- 1997 Whitney Museum of American Art, New York
- 1996 Arthouse Multimedia Centre for the Arts, Dublin, Ireland (solo)
- 1996 Crawford Municipal Art Gallery, Cork, Ireland (solo)
- 1996 David Winton Bell Gallery, Brown University
- 1995 Fawbush Gallery, New York (solo)
- 1994 Whitney Museum of American Art
- 1995 Greg Kucera Gallery, Seattle
- 1994 Fogg Art Museum, Harvard University, Cambridge
- 1994 National Museum of Modern and Contemporary Art, Seoul, Korea (portfolio)
- 1994 Snug Harbor Cultural Center, New York
- 1993 Whitney Biennial 1993, Whitney Museum of American Art
- 1993 National Museum of Modern and Contemporary Art, Seoul, Korea
- 1993 Museo Statale d'Arte Medioevale e Moderna, Arezzo, Italy
- 1993 Makuhari Messe, Tokyo
- 1993 The Drawing Center, New York
- 1993 Aspen Art Museum, Aspen
- 1992 The School of the Art Institute of Chicago
- 1991 MoMA PS1
- 1991 Pence Gallery, Los Angeles
- 1991 La Sala Mendoza, Caracas, Venezuela
- 1991 Art in General, New York
- 1991 Denver Art Museum, Denver
- 1989 Grey Art Gallery and Study Center, New York
- 1988 Los Angeles Contemporary Exhibitions (LACE)

== Written works ==
- Waldrop, R. & Macdonald, J. (1990). Peculiar Motions. Berkeley: Kelsey St. Press. ISBN 0932716261.
- Macdonald, J. & Leone, H. (1996). Passing. Miami: Miami-Dade Community College. ASIN: B003ZIOQZY
- Macdonald, J. & Leone, H. (1995). Questions of Feminism. October 71, Published by the MIT Press.
