= William Oandasan =

American poet, journalist, editor, and publisher

William Oandasan (1947–1992) was an American poet, journalist, editor, and publisher. He was born on the Round Valley Reservation in Northern California, to Yuki tribe and Filipino parents.

== Life ==
He founded the A Press in 1976 and edited A: A Journal of Contemporary Literature, one of the first literary magazines devoted to American Indian writers.

== Awards ==
- 1985 American Book Award for Round Valley Songs.

== Works ==
- Taking Off (1976);
- Earth & Sky, A Press (1976);
- Sermon & Three Waves: A Journey Through Night (1978);
- A Branch of California Redwood (1980);
- Moving Inland, A Publications (1983);
- Round Valley Songs. West End Press. 1984. ISBN 978-0-931122-35-4.;
- Round Valley Verses, Blue Cloud Quarterly (1987);
- Summer Night, A Publications (1989).

=== Anthologies ===
- Ishmael Reed, ed. (2003). From Totems to Hip-hop. Thunder's Mouth Press. p. 43. ISBN 978-1-56025-458-4. "William Oandasan."
