= Constance Porter Uzelac =

American medical librarian and archivist (1939–2012)

- Born: 1939; Washington D.C.
- Died: April 23, 2012 (aged 72–73); Fort Lauderdale, Florida
- Occupations: Medical librarian; Historical archivist
- Years active: 1987–2012

Constance Porter Uzelac (1939–2012), also known as Coni Porter Uzelac, was a medical librarian and archivist in the United States. She was the Executive Director of the Dorothy Porter Wesley Research Center. She is the daughter of Dorothy Porter Wesley and James Amos Porter, and assisted Wesley with writing many books. She also worked on cataloging all of her mother's works that were housed at the African American Library and Research Center. The catalog for her father was a part of the James A. Porter: From Me To You exhibition that was shown at various galleries across the United States.

== Career ==
Born in Washington D.C., Uzelac earned a degree in library studies and worked as a medical librarian for most of her life. After the death of her stepfather in 1987, she and her husband left their home in California to be close to her mother Dorothy in Fort Lauderdale, Florida. At the time, Dorothy Porter was working on organizing her sources on William Cooper Nell in order to write a comprehensive biography on him. Uzelac stepped in to help with the research, at first temporarily and then as a permanent co-author for the project.

Then, when her mother died in 1995, Uzelac moved the full collection of archived materials owned by her parents first to a studio in Washington D.C. and then to an apartment in Fort Lauderdale, with the collection originally being contained in 720 separate boxes. The collection that Uzelac curated included not only manuscripts and cookbooks from African-American slaves and servants, but also non-literary materials such as paintings, sculptures, carvings, and quilts. They were especially noted by historian Charles L. Blockson because the pieces in Uzelac's collection often contained signatures of authenticity.

In 1999, she was still in the process of deciding what to do with the collection and how it should be displayed for the public. The organizations interested included the Library of Congress, the African-American Research Library and Cultural Center, and the Smithsonian. She then organized the collection into the official Dorothy Porter Wesley Library, which she served as the executive director of. Due to her involvement in the creation of the African-American Research Library and Cultural Center in Fort Lauderdale, she decided to donate part of the collection to the center.

A large amount of her father's paintings were shown as a gallery exhibit for several months and 80 additional pieces were used in a traveling gallery across the US. Several were also gifted to the Maryland governor's mansion and a diplomat's home. For her mother's book collection, two were lent out to the Smithsonian and 50 as a library display. The vast majority of her collection is at the Broward County Main Library titled The Archives of Dorothy Porter Wesley. She established a series of educational websites in 2003 that featured pieces of Africana history. In addition to her curation work, she also served on the board of the Greater Fort Lauderdale branch of Sister Cities International. Uzelac died in April 2012 due to complications from cancer.

== Works ==
- Constance Porter Uzelac (2000). Dorothy Porter Wesley (1905-1995): Afro-American Librarian and Bibliophile
- Nell, William C., Dorothy Porter Wesley, and Constance Porter Uzelac (2002). William Cooper Nell, nineteenth-century African American abolitionist, historian, integrationist
- Constance Porter Uzelac (2011) (ed.). Stranger in One's Own Land: Autobiography of Charles H. Wesley (unpublished)
