= Founders Library =

Library in Washington, D.C.

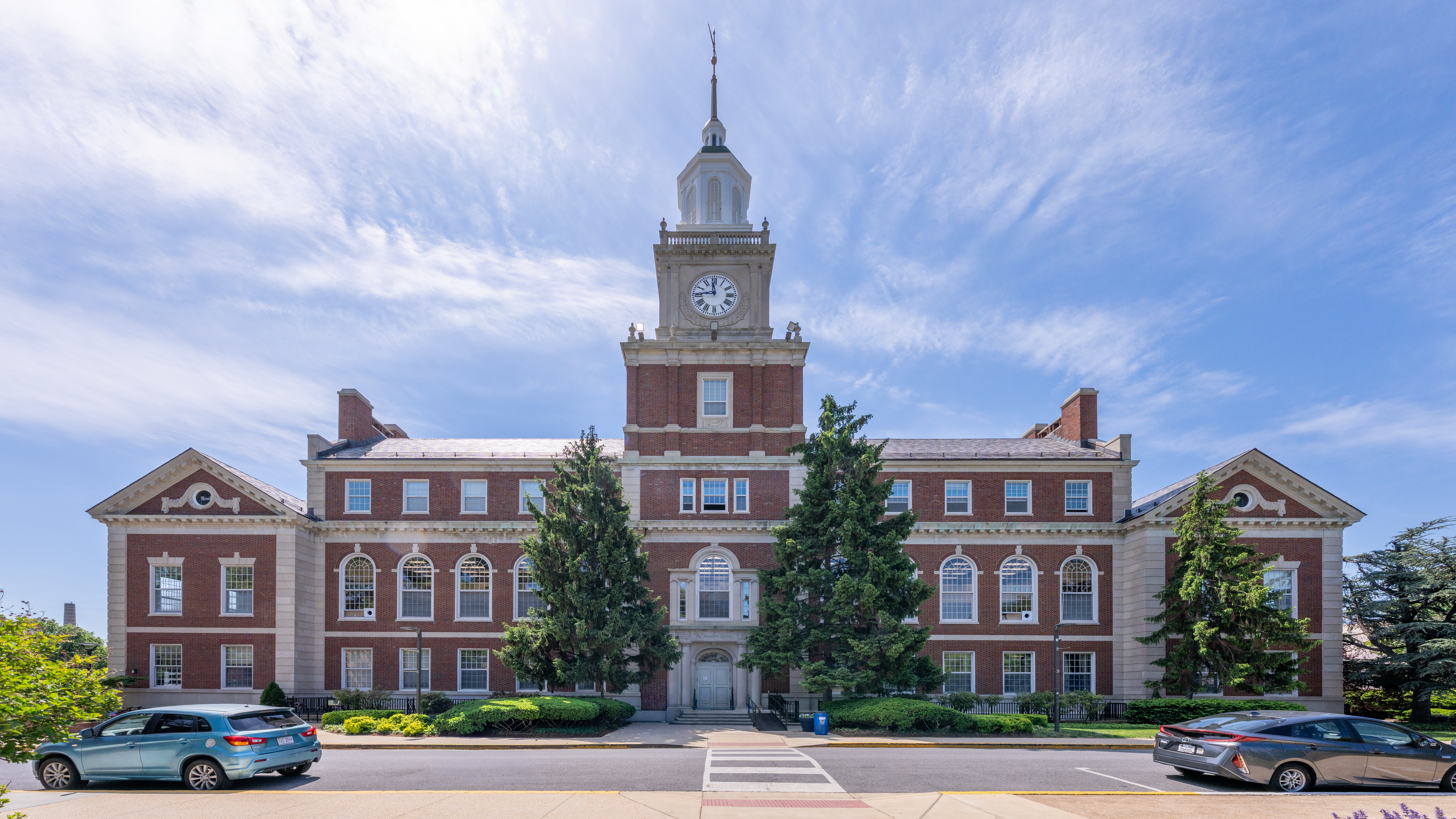
- Founders Library, Howard University
- 38.922306°N 77.019717°W
- Location: Washington D.C., United States
- Established: 1939
- Branches: 5

Collection
- Size: 1 million

Other information
- Director: Rhea Ballard-Thrower, MLIS JD
- Employees: 40
- Website: Founders Library

The Founders Library is an academic library at Howard University in Washington, D.C. The building, named The Founders Library in honor of the 17 men who founded Howard University, serves as a symbol of the university. Designed by architect Albert Irvin Cassell, construction began in 1937 during the presidency of Mordecai Wyatt Johnson. The second library built for the university, the cornerstone was laid on June 10, 1937, and the building was opened for service on January 3, 1939. The library houses over 1 million volumes, the Channing Pollock Theater Collection, and is the home to the Moorland-Spingarn Research Center.

== Location ==
The Founders Library is located on Howard University's main quad. It was constructed on the location of the university's first main building which housed many university departments and the original library. The campus is located in the Howard/Shaw Neighborhood of Washington, D.C. At the time of the library's construction, the neighborhood was home to numerous black luminaries. Carter G. Woodson, Nannie Helen Burroughs, Georgia Douglas Johnson, Mary McLeod Bethune and Mary Church Terrell, were a few of the residents who during their time, helped create the center of black intellectual life in Washington, D.C.

== History ==
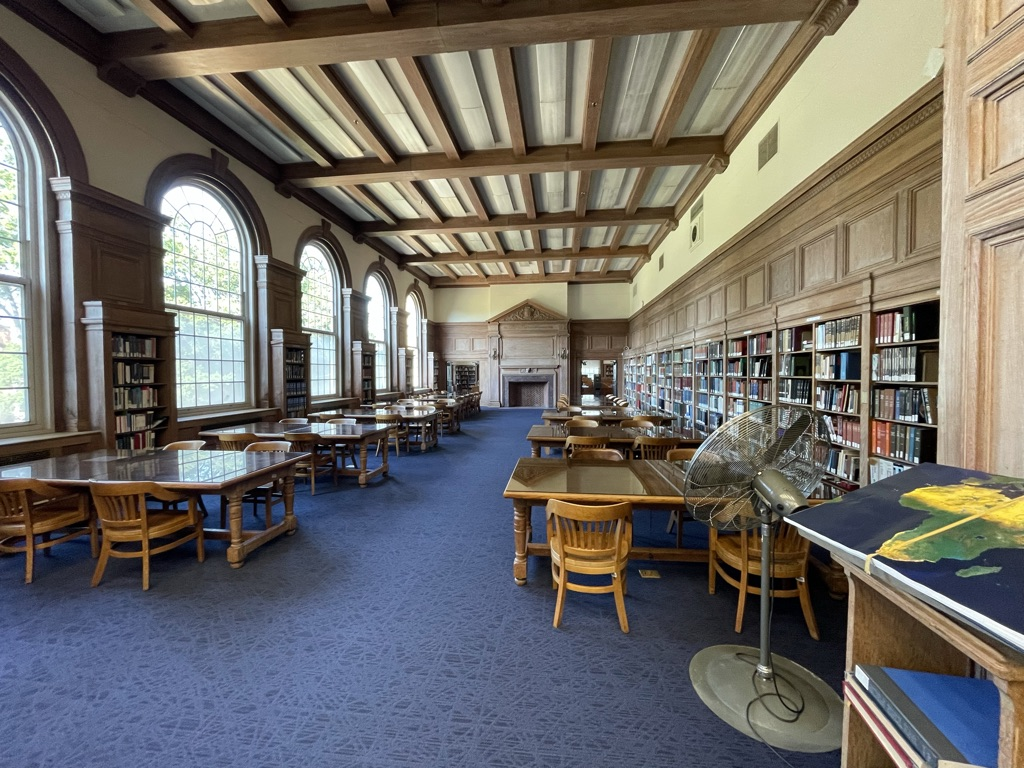
Second floor book room

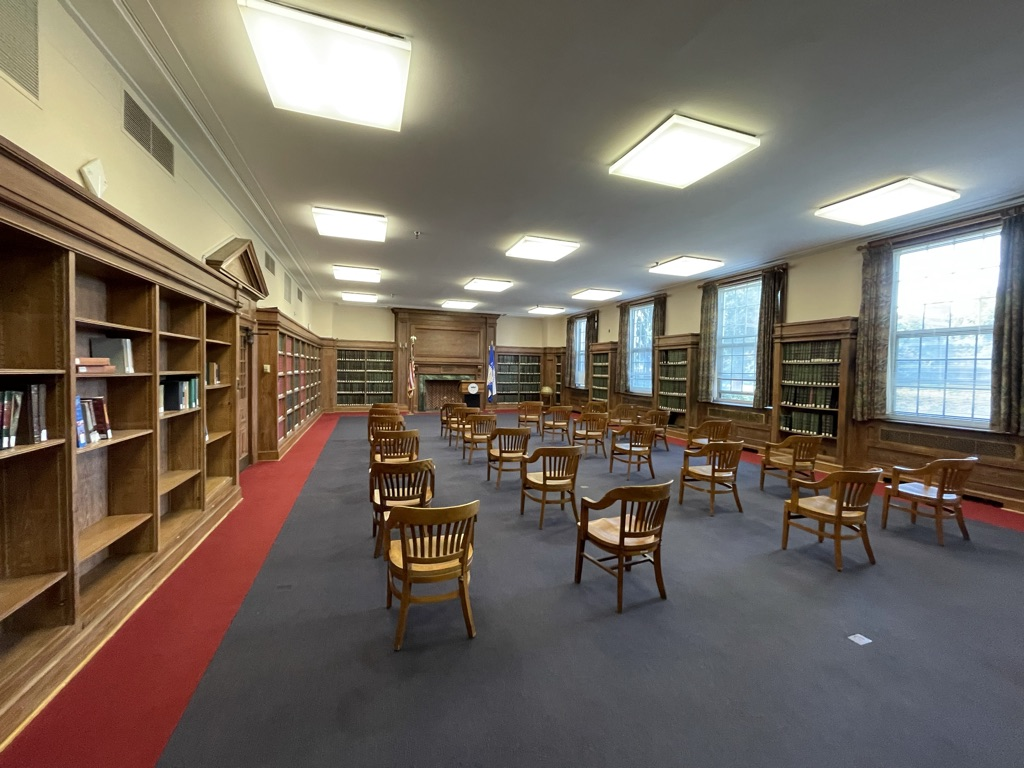
Plaintiff lawyers in the Brown v. Board of Education case, including Thurgood Marshall, practiced in this room. Also, Kamala Harris practiced the 2020 vice presidential debate here.

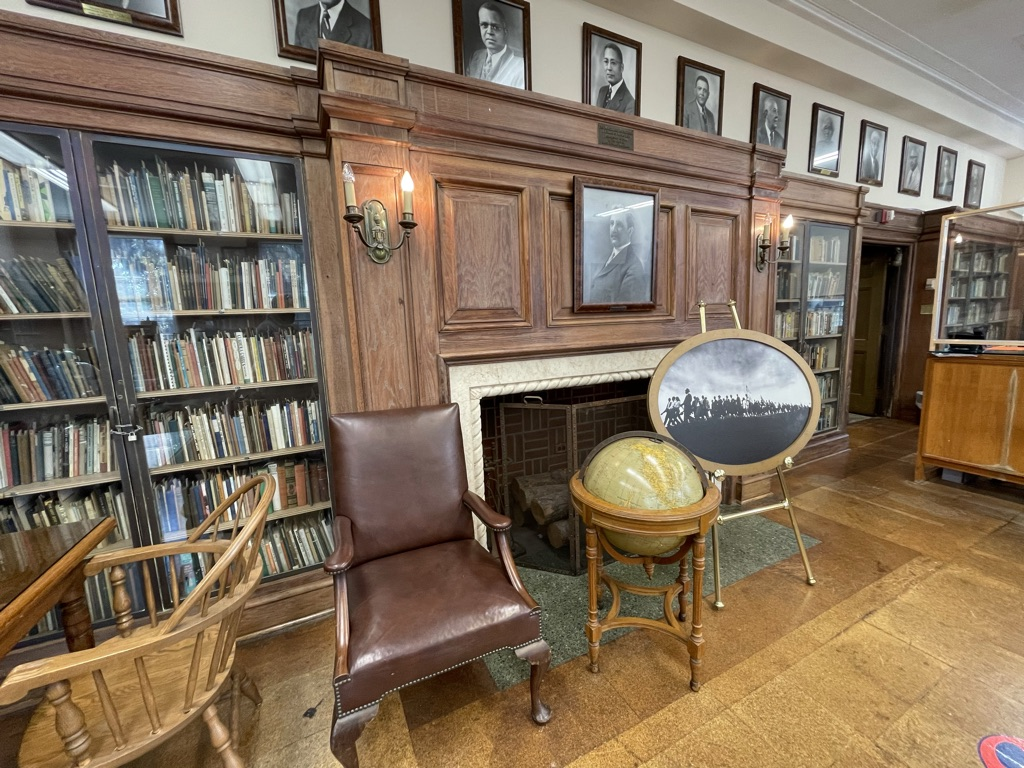

Planning Process

Discussions related to building a state of the art library on the campus of Howard University began in 1929. In that year, the U.S. Congress appropriated $1 million for the construction of the library. At the time, the university's library collection was housed in the Carnegie Library also located on the main campus. Opened in 1910, the Carnegie Library allowed for the expansion the library collection and number of which facilitated easier usage of the collection. Prior to this period, the library collection was scattered between the main building and individual libraries in each college. By 1929, the collection had grown to over 85,000 volumes and continued expanding through yearly appropriations of $4,000. The building also housed the Moorland Collection of over 3000 documents related to African and African American history donated in 1914 by Howard Trustee and YMCA executive Jesse E. Moorland. Due to its continued growth, the Carnegie Library was strained by usage at the time. Thus, a new library was commissioned.

=== Construction ===
Although funds were appropriated for construction in 1929, construction did not begin until 1936. To accommodate its construction, the original main building on the campus was demolished. In addition, the President's house, which sat next to the main building was moved. Upon completion, Founders Library was described as a "palace of books" and was the most comprehensive library at any Historically Black College or University. Founders was dedication in May 1939. U.S. Secretary of the Interior Harold Ickes, who was prominent in securing the funding for the library, said this of the importance of libraries:

We can hardly over-estimate the role of libraries in modern life. They constitute perhaps the most important single agency for the perpetuation of civilization. To the libraries we entrust for safe keeping our accumulated social, artistic and scientific knowledge. It is upon their resources that we largely depend for knowing and understand the past; it is by their help that we may undertake to absorb the knowledge and develop the intellectual habits necessary for effective participation in the democratic way of life; and it is mainly through them that we hope to be able to project our own contributions into and influence the future.

=== Architecture ===
The Founders Library is a Georgian style, red brick building with a clock tower visible throughout Washington, D.C. The building contained many of the most advanced technological advancements of the day including mechanical elevators and air conditioning. Founders Library cost $1.106 million in 1939 and was one of the most important academic structures of the 1940s. The library has five reading rooms. The main reading room is 120 feet (37 m) by 32 feet (9.8 m).

A contemporary account by one of the leading architects in Albert Cassell's firm makes clear how the project began:

The university was fairly specific. They gave us the names and the sizes for the principal spaces, and the number of books that they wanted to provide for. They suggested that this building have a tower. Old Main Building had one. The site given was on top of the hill where the Old Main Building sat. It would have to go and the president's house would have to be moved.

We found that a building about 200 feet long by 100 feet wide would do if we made the building four healthy stories high and provided for six levels of stacks. ... The tower should be exactly in the center and should read as a tower from the north campus (the larger, more prominent campus).

The tower was borrowed from Independence Hall in Philadelphia. Since it was dedicated to liberty we felt that we could do no better.

From these design parameters came a structure of striking nobility. When it was dedicated on May 25, 1939, The Founders Library opened to rave reviews. Newspaper headlines shouted, "Howard Memorial to Founders Is Like Aladdin's Palace." No detail was too small to escape notice.

The sound proofed walls and ceilings enable readers to talk in one corner of the room without being heard in the other. Floors are of cork and rubber, $1,000 rugs so deep readers will sink in to their ankles.

The browsing room is fitted with cream colored monk's cloth drapes, Spanish leather easy chairs and couches and Axminster rugs that cost $1,000 each.

The importance of the library was also recognized in 2012 by the National Trust for Historic Preservation as it named the library a "national treasure."

== Collections ==
=== Main library collection ===
The main library uses consist in more than 40 thousand books organized using the Library of Congress Classification:

=== The Charles Eaton Burch Collection ===
An extensive collection of Eighteenth Century English Literature curated by former Howard University professors Charles E. Burch. Burch headed the Howard University English Department and received wide acclaim as a professor of 17th, 18th century English Literature. His major research concerned the literary and political activities of author Daniel Defoe.

=== The Channing Pollock Theater Collection ===
The Channing Pollock Theater Collection is a non-circulating special collection of the Howard University Libraries. Devoted to the performing arts, the Channing Pollock Collection was established in 1950 by Helen Channing Pollock, daughter of the late American playwright and critic, Channing Pollock. The collection was formally presented to Howard in May 1952 during the university's Festival of Fine Arts.

The collection contains the playwright's published works, manuscripts, and personal correspondence with celebrities of his day. It also includes photographs, programs, broadsides, sheet music representing different phases of the theatrical and entertainment world, and extensive original clippings files that provide an historical sketch of the role and place of Black performers on the American stage, in movies, and on television. The collection's strengths are Shakespearean drama and criticism as well as English and American theater of the 19th century.

=== The Moorland-Spingarn Research Center ===
The Moorland–Spingarn Research Center (MSRC) is recognized as one of the world's largest and most comprehensive repositories for the documentation of the history and culture of people of African descent in Africa, the Americas, and other parts of the world. The Moorland-Spingarn Research Center is located within the Founders Library.

== Importance ==
It housed Howard University's School of Law during the 1930s-1950s, many of the major achievements of that department's faculty were completed in the building. This included much of the work on the famed Brown v. Board of Topeka, Kansas case. The case, which originated with Charles Hamilton Houston, Dean of the Howard University School of Law, was eventually argued by Houston's former student and mentee, Thurgood Marshall, who later became an Associate Justice of the United States Supreme Court.

== Services ==
Founders Library provide library cards to Howard Students only in order to borrow books and other materials. Founders serves Howard students and general public; Visitors must present their photo ID to the librarian receptionist.

=== Accessibility ===
The library follows Accessibility and comply with ADA regulations:

- Two wheelchair ramps on the entrance.
- One elevator that allow go from the first floor (3rd stack) to the 2nd floor (5th stack). But the first and secondary door of the elevator must be closed properly in order to use the elevator and to allow users on other floors control the elevator; The elevator floor and room floor may not be at the same level, so people on wheelchair may need the assistance of a person to open both doors before enter and to lift a few centimeters the wheelchair and push them into the elevator, and to help them open the secondary door and exit from the elevator and close the secondary door to allow people in other floors use the elevator.
- Two nongendered restrooms in the first floor at the entrance of the library.

== Library Directors ==
Since 1867, Howard University has had 24 University Librarians/Directors.

Danforth B. Nichols (1867 – 1873)

Lorenzo Westcott (1873 – 1874)

George W. Mitchell (1874 – 1875)

Charles H. A. Bulkley (1882 – 1890)

H.O. Cushman (1890)

Irene C Tyler (1891 – 1897)

Flora L.P. Johnson (1898 – 1912)

Grace Liscom Hewett-Watkin (1912 – 1916)

Edward C. Williams (1916 – 1929)

Emma G. Murray (1929 – 1935)

Walter G. Daniel (1935 – 1946)

Joseph H. Reason (1946 – 1971)

William D. Cunningham (1971 – 1973)

Kenneth S. Wilson (interim, 1973 – 1975)

Binford H. Conley (1975 – 1983)

Juanita H. Portis (interim, 1983 – 1986)

Dorothy M. Haith (1986 – 1988)

Thomas C. Battle (interim, 1988 – 1989)

Ann K. Randall (1989 – 1994)

Mohamed Mekkawi (interim, 1994 – 1996; 1996 – 2011)

Arthuree Wright (Interim, 2011)

Howard Dodson (2012 – 2015)

Carrie Hackney (interim, 2015 – 2016)

Rhea Ballard-Thrower (2016 – present)

== See also ==
- The Howard University Libraries
- List of Carnegie libraries in Washington, D.C.
