= E. Ethelbert Miller =

American poet (born 1950)

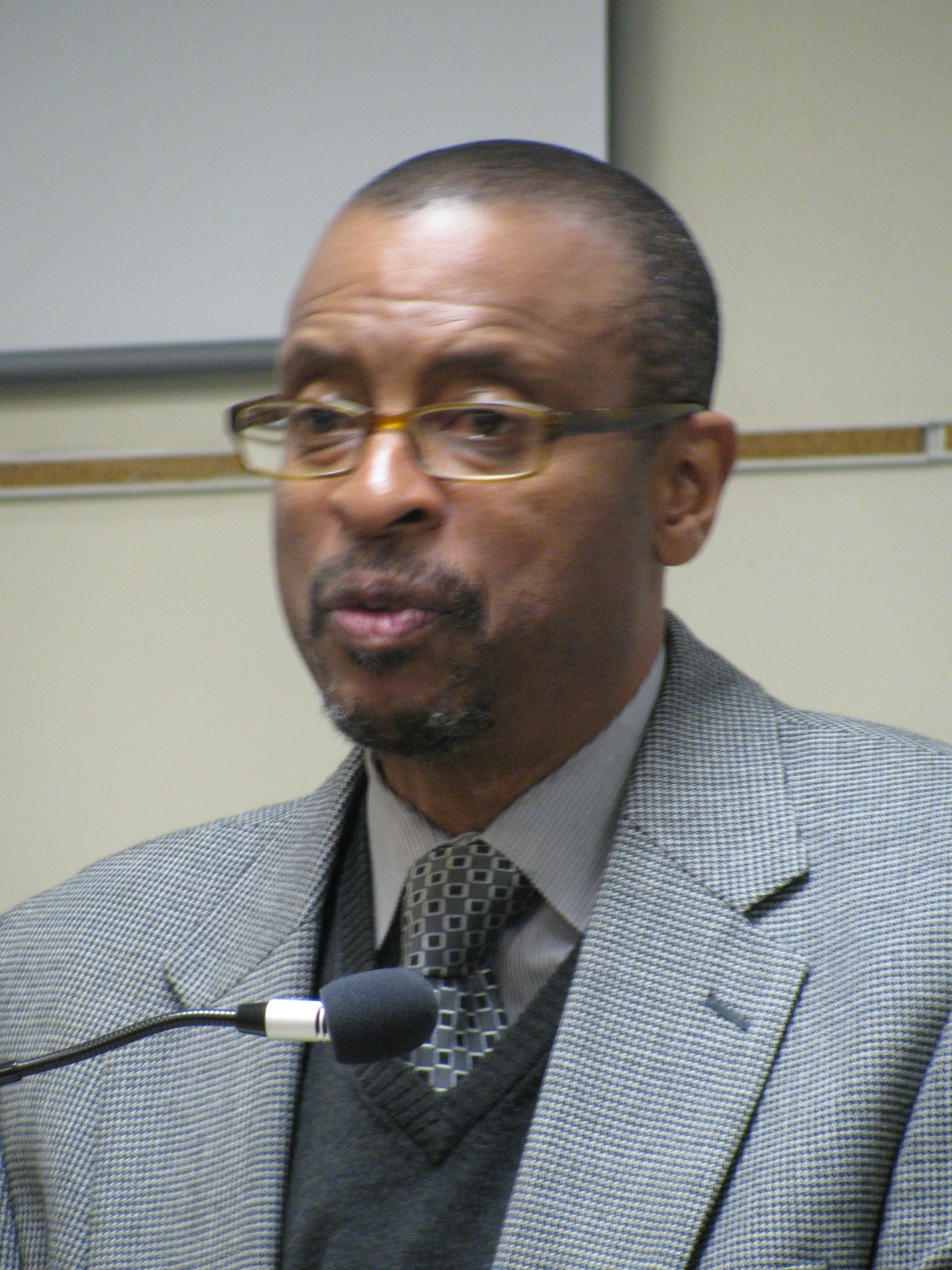
- Miller at the 2013 Fall for the Book
- Born: Eugene Ethelbert Miller; November 20, 1950 (age 76); Bronx, New York, U.S.
- Education: Howard University
- Occupations: Professor, poet and literary activist
- Writing career
- Language: English
- Genres: Poetry; memoir
- Notable awards: O. B. Hardison, Jr. Poetry Prize

Eugene Ethelbert Miller (born November 20, 1950) is an African-American poet, teacher and literary activist, based in Washington, DC. He is the author of several collections of poetry and two memoirs, was the editor of Poet Lore magazine, and is the host of the weekly WPFW morning radio show On the Margin.

== Life and career ==
Miller was born in The Bronx, New York. He received his B.A. from Howard University. He is the author of several books of poetry and two memoirs and is the editor of multiple poetry anthologies. His work has appeared in numerous publications, including Beltway Poetry Quarterly, Poet Lore and Sojourners.

Miller was the founder and director of the Ascension Poetry Reading Series, one of the oldest literary series in the Washington area. He was director of Howard University's African-American Resource Center for more than 40 years from 1974. Miller has taught at various schools, including American University, Emory & Henry University, George Mason University, Harpeth Hall School and the University of Nevada, Las Vegas. He was also a core faculty member of the writing seminars at Bennington College. He did work for Operation Homecoming for the National Endowment for the Humanities.

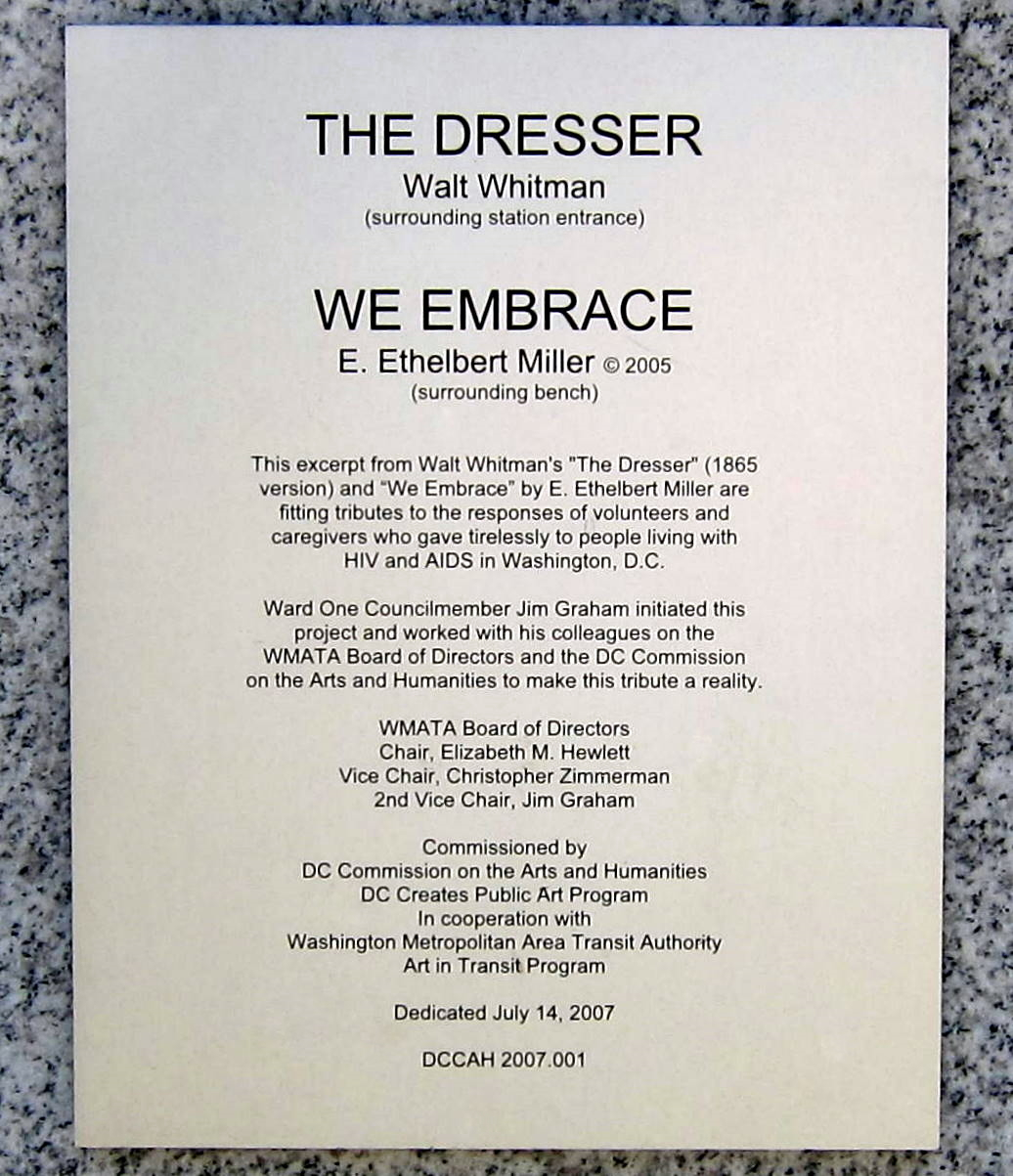
A sign on the north entrance to the Dupont Circle Metro station in Washington, D.C. An excerpt from "We Embrace" by E. Ethelbert Miller is inscribed into the sidewalk surrounding a nearby circular bench.

He currently serves as board chairperson of the Institute for Policy Studies. He was also on the boards of Split This Rock and the Writer's Center, and from 2002 to 2019 was co-editor of Poet Lore magazine, the oldest poetry journal in the US. He is former chair of the Humanities Council of Washington, D.C., and has served on the boards of the AWP, the Edmund Burke School, PEN American Center, PEN/Faulkner Foundation, and the Washington Area Lawyer for the Arts. He hosts a weekly morning radio show on WPFW called On the Margin.

In 1979, the mayor of Washington, D.C., Marion Barry, proclaimed September 28, 1979, as E. Ethelbert Miller Day. On May 21, 2001, an E. Ethelbert Miller Day was also proclaimed by the mayor of Jackson, Tennessee.

Miller's papers are held at Emory & Henry University and George Washington University.

== Awards and honors ==
- 1982: Washington, D.C., Mayor's Art Award for Literature
- 1988: Public Humanities Award from the D.C. Humanities Council
- 1993: Columbia Merit Award
- 1994: Honorary citizen of the city of Baltimore
- 1994: PEN Oakland Josephine Miles Award (for In Search of Color Everywhere)
- 1995: O. B. Hardison Jr. Poetry Prize
- 1996: Honorary doctorate of literature from Emory & Henry College
- 1997: Stephen Henderson Poetry Award from the African American Literature and Culture Society
- 2003: District of Columbia Public Library DC WE READ One City One Book program selection (for Fathering Words)
- 2004: Fulbright Scholarship
- 2015: Washington, D.C. Hall of Fame induction
- 2016: George Garrett Award for Outstanding Community Service in Literature from the Association of Writers & Writing Programs
- 2016: DC Mayor's Arts Award for Distinguished Honor
- 2018: Gamma Xi Phi induction
- 2022: Howard Zinn Lifetime Achievement Award from the Peace and Justice Studies Association
- 2025: Reginald Lockett Lifetime Achievement Award from PEN Oakland

== Publications ==
=== Poetry ===
- Andromeda. Chiva Publications. 1974.
- The Migrant Worker. Washington Writers' Publishing House. 1978. ISBN 978-0-931846-07-6.
- Season of Hunger/Cry of Rain: Poems 1975-1980. Lotus Press. 1982. ISBN 978-0-916418-35-9.
- Where Are the Love Poems for Dictators?. Open Hand Publishing. 1986. ISBN 978-0-940880-65-8.
- The Fire This Time: 1992 and Beyond Los Angeles. White Fields Press. 1993.
- First Light: New and Selected Poems. Black Classic Press. 1993. ISBN 978-0-933121-81-2.
- Whispers, Secrets, and Promises. Black Classic Press. 1998. ISBN 978-1-57478-011-6.
- Buddha Weeping in Winter. Red Dragonfly Press. 2001. ISBN 978-1-890193-25-6.
- How We Sleep On the Nights We Don't Make Love. Curbstone Press. 2004. ISBN 978-1-931896-04-7.
- On Saturdays, I Santana With You. Curbstone Press. 2009. ISBN 978-1-931896-50-4.
- The Collected Poems of E. Ethelbert Miller. Edited by Kirsten Porter. Willow Books. 2016. ISBN 978-0996139021.
- If God Invented Baseball: Poems. Simon and Schuster. 2018. ISBN 9781947951006.
- When Your Wife Has Tommy John Surgery and Other Baseball Stories. Simon and Schuster. 2021. ISBN 9781947951365.

=== Anthologies ===
- Beyond the Frontier: African American Poetry for the 21st Century. Black Classic Press. 2002. ISBN 978-1-57478-017-8.
- In Search of Color Everywhere: A Collection of African American Poetry. Edited with Terrance Cummings. Stewart, Tabori & Chang. 1994. ISBN 978-1-55670-339-3.
- Women Surviving Massacres and Men. Anemone Press. 1977.
- Synergy, an Anthology of Washington D. C. Black Poetry. Edited with Ahmos Zu-Bolton II. Energy Blacksouth Press. 1975.

=== Memoirs ===
- The 5th Inning. Busboys and Poets. 2009. ISBN 978-1-60486-062-7.
- Fathering Words: The Making of an African American Writer. St. Martin's Press. 2000. ISBN 978-0-312-27013-1.
