= Lowery Stokes Sims =

American art historian, curator (b. 1949)

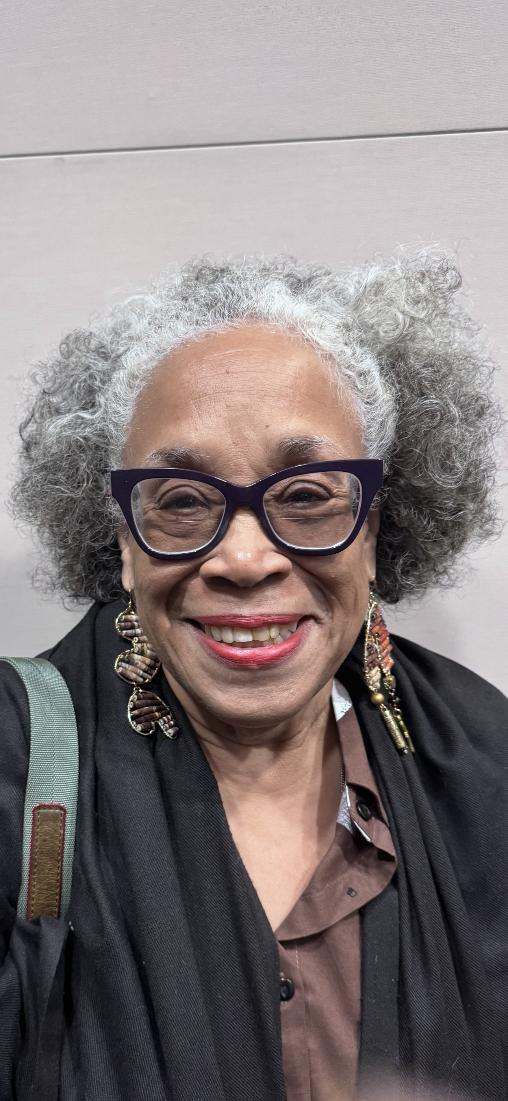
- Sims at the 2026 African Diaspora International Film Festival
- Born: 1949 (age 76–77); Washington, D.C., United States
- Education: Queens College, City University of New York (BA), Johns Hopkins University (MA), City University of New York (PhD)
- Occupations: Art historian, curator, arts administrator, educator
- Known for: Scholar of modern and contemporary art

Lowery Stokes Sims (born 1949) is an American art historian and curator of modern and contemporary art. She is known for her expertise in the work of African, African American, Latinx, Native and Asian American artists such as Wifredo Lam, Fritz Scholder, Romare Bearden, Joyce J. Scott and others. She served on the curatorial staff of the Metropolitan Museum of Art, the Studio Museum in Harlem, and the Museum of Arts and Design. She has frequently served as a guest curator, lectured internationally and published extensively, and has received many public appointments. Sims was featured in the 2010 documentary film !Women Art Revolution.

== Education ==
Lowery Stokes Sims was born in 1949, in Washington, D.C., United States. She was raised Catholic in New York City (in the Bronx and Queens), Sims graduated from Bishop Reilly High School (now St. Francis Preparatory School) in Fresh Meadows, Queens, New York in 1966.

She holds a B.A. degree in art history from Queens College, City University of New York, and a M.A. degree in art history from Johns Hopkins University. Sims received her Ph.D. in art history in 1995 from the Graduate School of the City University of New York. The subject of her dissertation was the Afro-Cuban Chinese Surrealist artist Wifredo Lam and the International Avant-Garde, 1923–1992, which was published by the University of Texas Press in 2002.

== Career ==
=== Metropolitan Museum of Art ===
Sims was on the education and curatorial staff of the Metropolitan Museum of Art from 1972 to 1999. She said her mission "was to make sure that artists of color and overlooked white artists were represented in the museum's collection." She participated in the organization of several exhibitions including Ellsworth Kelly (1979), John Marin: Selected Works from the Museum's Collection (1981), Henry Moore: 60 Years of His Art (1983), and Charles Burchfield (1984). In 1991, she curated Stuart Davis, American Painter, and she was the principal author of the catalogue. In 1995, Sims coordinated the Museum's venue of the exhibition I Tell My Heart: The Art of Horace Pippin, organized by the Museum of the Pennsylvania Academy of Art, and curated Paul Cadmus: The Seven Deadly Sins and Selections from the Collection. In 1997, Dr. Sims curated the exhibition Richard Pousette-Dart, 1916–1992 and coordinated Francesco Clemente: Indian Watercolors organized by the Indianapolis Museum of Art. In 1999, she organized Hans Hofmann in the Metropolitan Museum of Art and coordinated the exhibition Barbara Chase-Riboud: Monument Drawings, organized by the St. John's Museum in Wilmington, North Carolina.

Sims also organized several exhibitions from the collection of the Metropolitan Museum in cooperation with the American Federation of Arts, for which she was also involved in writing catalogues: The Figure in Twentieth Century Art: Selections from the Collection of The Metropolitan Museum of Art (1985), The Landscape in Twentieth Century Art: Selections from the Collection of The Metropolitan Museum of Art (1991), American Still Life Painting (1995). For more than a decade, Sims also was responsible for the annual installation of the Museum's Iris and B. Gerald Cantor Roof Garden, including the 1999 installation, Abakanowicz on the Roof.

=== Studio Museum in Harlem ===
From 2000 to 2007, Sims was executive director, then president, of the Studio Museum in Harlem and served as adjunct curator for the permanent collection. She was the coordinating curator for the 2003 exhibition, Challenge of the Modern: African American Artists, 1925–1945, and Fred Brown: Icons and Heroes (2003), which she originally curated for the Kemper Museum of Contemporary Art.

In 2004, she was the curator for Curator's Eye, focusing on contemporary installation art in Jamaica, at the National Gallery, Kingston, Jamaica. She was also the curator for The Persistence of Geometry, selections from the collection of the Cleveland Museum of Art, which was shown at the Museum of Contemporary Art, Cleveland in 2006. That same year she co-curated Legacies: Contemporary Artists Reflect on Slavery at the New York Historical Society.

=== Museum of Arts and Design ===
Sims is the retired curator emerita at the Museum of Arts and Design (MAD), where between 2007 and 2015, she served as the Charles Bronfman International Curator and then the William and Mildred Lasdon Chief Curator. At MAD, Sims co-curated "Second Lives: Remixing the Ordinary" (2008) and "Dead or Alive: Artists Respond to Nature" (2010). She also conceived and co-curated "The Global Africa Project" (2010–11) and "Against the Grain: Wood in Contemporary Art, Craft and Design" which opened in March 2013. In 2014, she curated the exhibitions "Maryland to Murano: Neckpieces and Sculptures by Joyce J. Scott," and "New Territories: Laboratories for Design, Craft and Art in Latin America."

== Awards ==
Sims received the 1991 Frank Jewett Mather Award from the College Art Association for distinction in art criticism and the association's 2018 Distinguished Feminist Award.

Sims has also received honorary degrees from the Maryland Institute College of Art (1988), Moore College of Art and Design (1991), Parsons School of Design at the New School University (2000), the Atlanta College of Art (2002), and College of New Rochelle and Brown University (2003).

== Teaching ==
Sims was a fellow at the Clark Art Institute in spring 2007. In 2005 and 2006, she was visiting professor at Queens College and Hunter College in New York City and in fall 2007, visiting scholar in the Department of Art at the University of Minnesota, Twin Cities. She is an adjunct professor at the Institute of Fine Arts, New York University, and a distinguished professor at the University of California, Irvine Claire Trevor School of the Arts.

== Guest curator ==
Sims has lectured nationally and internationally and guest curated numerous exhibitions, including at the National Gallery of Jamaica, Kingston, Jamaica (2004), The Cleveland Museum of Art and the New York Historical Society (2006). She has served nationally and internationally as a juror and guest curator at The Queens Museum, The Studio Museum in Harlem, Pratt Institute, the Caribbean Cultural Center (New York), Cooper Union, The New Museum of Contemporary Art, the California African American Museum, the Maryland Institute College of Art, and the Contemporary Arts Center in New Orleans.

== Public appointments ==
While at the Studio Museum, Sims served as chair of the Cultural Institutions Group, a coalition of botanical gardens, historic sites, museums and zoos funded by the City of New York. She also served on panels for the New York City Department of Cultural Affairs, The Metropolitan Transportation Authority of New York City, The Metropolitan Life Foundation, the New York State Council on the Arts, and the National Endowment for the Arts and the Humanities. In 1981, Sims was elected member of the Commission on the Status of Women of the City of New York, and in 1987 was appointed for a five-year term to the New York State Council on the Arts by Governor Mario Cuomo. She has served on the board of Art Table, Inc., and the Caribbean Cultural Center and the advisory committee of the Vera List Center for Art and Politics at the New School for Social Research, and the advisory committee of the Center for Curatorial Studies at Bard College. She is currently on the boards of the Art Matters, The Louis Comfort Tiffany Foundation and Art 21. In 1993, she was elected to the board of the College Art Association for a four-year term, and was co-chair of the studio art program for the 1994 annual conference of the CAA. In 2003 and 2004, she served on the jury for the World Trade Center Site Memorial Competition to choose the memorial for the World Trade Center site. In 2006 and 2015, she was the James A. Porter Colloquium on African American Art keynote speaker.

== Bibliography ==
- Sims, L. S. & Davis, S. (1991). Stuart Davis: American Painter. New York: Metropolitan Museum of Art.
- Metropolitan Museum of Art (New York, N.Y.), Sims, L. S., Rewald, S., Lieberman, W. S., & American Federation of Arts. (1996). Still Life: The Object in American Art, 1915-1995: Selections from the Metropolitan Museum of Art. New York: Rizzoli.
- Sims, L. S., & Bearden, R. (1993). Romare Bearden. New York, N.Y.: Rizzoli Publications.
- Sims, L. S., & Lam, W. (2002). Wifredo Lam and the International Avant-Garde, 1923-1982. Austin, Tex: University of Texas Press.
- Sims, L.S. (editor). (2008). Fritz Scholder: Indian Not Indian. Washington, DC, and New York, NY: Smithsonian Institution and New York, N.Y.: Prestel.
- Sims, L. S., Ramírez, M. C., Rangel, G., Rivas, J., Basha, R., Pope, N. L., Lopes, F., ... Museum of Arts and Design (New York, N.Y.). (2014). New Territories: Laboratories for Design, Craft and Art in Latin America.
- Sims, L. S., Carr, D., & Museum of Fine Arts. (2015). Common Wealth: Art by African Americans in the Museum of Fine Arts, Boston. Boston: MFA Publications.
- Sims, L. S. and Sims, Patterson. (2018). Joyce J. Scott: Harriet Tubman and Other Truths. Hamilton, New Jersey: Grounds for Sculpture.
