= Moorland–Spingarn Research Center =

Center at Howard University in the US

Coordinates: 38.9176°N 77.0208°W

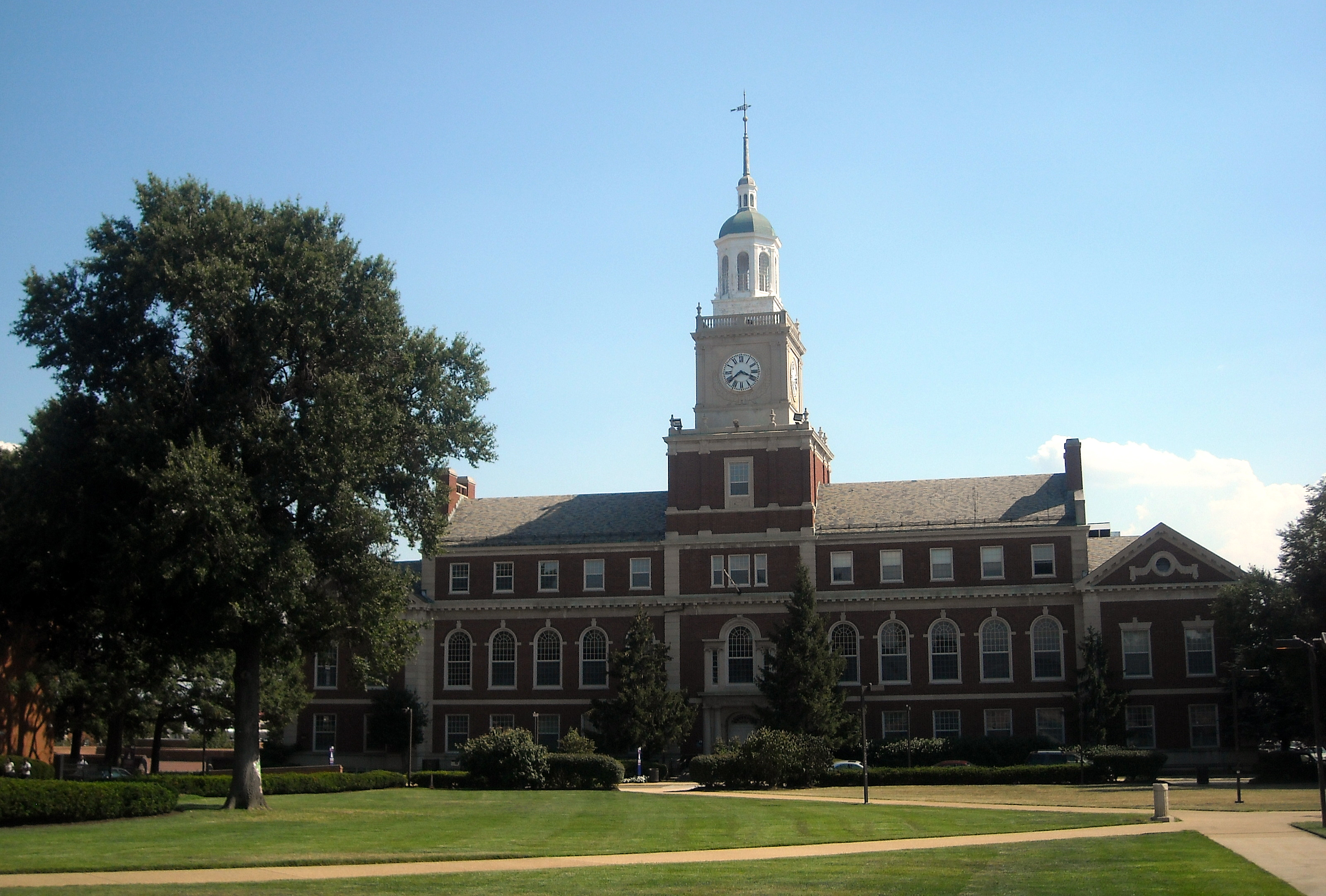
Moorland-Spingarn Research Center located in Howard University Founders Library (2008)

The Moorland–Spingarn Research Center (MSRC) in Washington, D.C., founded in 1914 as the Moorland Library, is located on the campus of Howard University on the first and ground floors of Founders Library. The MSRC is recognized as one of the world's largest and most comprehensive repositories for the documentation of the history and culture of people of African descent in Africa, the Americas, and other parts of the world. As one of Howard University's major research facilities, the MSRC collects, preserves, organizes and makes available for research a wide range of resources chronicling the Black experience. Thus, it maintains a tradition of service that dates to the formative years of Howard University, when materials related to Africa and African Americans were first acquired.

== History ==
In 1914, J. E. Moorland, a Black theologian who was an alumnus and trustee of the university, donated his private library, at that time considered to be one of the most significant collections of Black related materials in existence. Moorland's donation reflected the efforts of African Americans to take a leadership role in the documentation, preservation, and study of their own history and culture. His collection provided the catalyst for the centralization of the University Library's other Black-related materials, which became known collectively as the 'Moorland Foundation. In 1946, Howard University acquired the large personal library of Arthur B. Spingarn, an attorney, social activist, and prominent collector of books and other materials produced by Black people. The Moorland–Spingarn Research Center is named for these two benefactors, whose collections provided the foundation upon which later development could be built.

Although several librarians helped to develop the Moorland Foundation's collection during the early years, the appointment in 1930 of Dorothy B. Porter (later Dorothy B. Porter Wesley) signaled a new era. In a career that spanned more than forty years, Dr. Porter Wesley guided the collection through substantial expansion, including the development of a new classification scheme, authoritative bibliographies, and a wide variety of research tools.

In 1973, the collections were reorganized as the Moorland–Spingarn Research Center, and Dr. Michael R. Winston was appointed its first director. Under Winston's leadership, separate Library and Manuscript Divisions were established, and the Howard University Museum and Howard University Archives were created. While the Library Division was expected to continue to expand the MSRC's extensive collections of books, newspapers, journals, and printed materials, the other units were an integral part of the Research Center's new program development. The new programs emphasized the identification, acquisition, preservation, research and exhibition of materials that could transform the existing special collections into a modern archives and manuscript repository and museum facility. From 1986 to 2010 the MSRC was directed by Thomas C. Battle. Following Battle's departure, the center was directed by Howard Dodson until 2016.

Current plans call for a greater reliance upon digitization and online accessibility, increased public programs, and sponsored research projects, including an active commitment to publishing the products of research conducted at the Research Center by its staff and other scholars.

== Divisions ==
=== The Library Division ===
With more than 175,000 books, pamphlets, periodicals and microforms in numerous languages in its collections, the Library Division provides extensive documentary evidence of the history, lives and struggles of people of African descent.

Among the library's holdings are many rare works, going back to the 16th century, by such notables as Juan Latino, Jacobus Capitein, Gustavus Vassa, Phillis Wheatley, Jupiter Hammon, David Walker, Frederick Douglass and Martin Delaney. The collections are particularly strong in the first editions and first works by early 20th century contemporary writers, including W. E. B. Du Bois, Richard Wright, Alice Walker, Nicolas Guillén, Wole Soyinka, James Baldwin, Chinua Achebe, Toni Morrison and Amiri Baraka. Special resources within the division's collections include: theses and dissertations written on Black-related topics by students of other colleges and universities; English and foreign-language newspapers, journals and magazines that provide current and retrospective examination of the Black diasporic experience; and an extensive vertical file collection consisting of thousands of folders of biographical and subject-related ephemeral materials, which often serve as the sole source of information on obscure as well as better known people and events. Current and rare titles are added regularly to the collection to enhance its growth and development.

=== Manuscript Division ===
The resources of the Manuscript Division combine to provide important insight into the growth and development of Black families, organizations, institutions, social and religious consciousness, and the continuing struggle for civil rights and human justice. Organized in 1974 into four departments – Manuscripts, Prints and Photographs, Oral History, and Music – the collections of primary source materials of the Manuscript Division complement the resources of the Library Division and broaden the scope of areas for research on the black experience.

With holdings totaling more than 18,000 linear feet, the Manuscript Department provides extensive documentation of African-American life and history. Currently more than 650 collections are available for research. These collections include the correspondence, photographs, diaries, scrapbooks, writings and memorabilia of such notables as Alain Locke, E. Franklin Frazier, Frederick Douglass, Mary Church Terrell, Anna J. Cooper, and Paul and Eslanda Robeson.

The Prints and Photographs Department makes available for study, research and exhibition more than 150,000 graphic images, including photographs, slides, postcards, broadsides, prints, and maps. These works date from the 1800s to the present and feature drawings and sketches, daguerreotypes, tintypes, stereograph cards and glass plate negatives.

Music, reflecting Black participation in and contributions to the development of jazz, folk, spiritual, popular and classical styles, is well documented by the Music Department. Its collections are rich in sheet music, recordings, song book albums, and instructional concert material for voice and piano. The collection documents more than 400 composers dating from the 18th century to the present.

Important and essential documentation of the civil rights era is available in the collections of the Oral History Department. The Ralph J. Bunche Oral History Collection totals well over 700 transcripts that provide valuable insight into the thoughts and actions of the people who participated in and shaped this critical period in American history. Other collections focus on women, Howard University, African-American military history and memoirs of some of the donors whose papers are deposited in the Manuscript Department.

=== The Howard University Archives and Museum ===
The Howard University Archives serves as a secure repository for the official records of the university, including the administrative files of schools, colleges and departments, university publications, Howard theses and dissertations, as well as materials illustrating the contributions of Howard alumni to society. The Archives provides information on the history of Howard University and its important personages and utilizes the Howard University Museum to showcase University artifacts and memorabilia.

The Museum emphasizes the visual documentation of Black history and culture. It exhibits the myriad resources of the Research Center's many special collections and acquires artifacts useful for a broad interpretation of the Black experience.

=== Digital Production Center ===
In 2013, the MSRC began a new chapter when it established an official digitization program. Through the Digital Production Center, MSRC preserves and shares its historic records with the world. The digital program also manages the Digital Howard online repository. The platform currently hosts the digital collections from the MSRC. Digital Collections include the archives of Anna J. Cooper and Howard University namesake Oliver Otis Howard as well as the Thomas Montgomery Gregory Military Collection and the 6,000 image Negatives Collection.

== See also ==
- African American Library at the Gregory School
- Auburn Avenue Research Library on African American Culture and History
- Schomburg Center for Research in Black Culture
