= Tritobia Hayes Benjamin =

African-American art historian

- Born: October 22, 1944; Brinkley, Arkansas, US
- Died: June 21, 2014 (aged 69); Arlington, Virginia, US
- Education: Howard University (BA, MA); University of Maryland, College Park (PhD)
- Known for: African American art, art history and artistry, American Art History
- Spouse: Donald S. Benjamin
- Awards: Women's Caucus for Art Lifetime Achievement Award

Tritobia Hayes Benjamin (October 22, 1944 – June 21, 2014) was an American art historian and educator. She began teaching in 1970 as professor of Art History at Howard University, College of Fine Arts, specializing in African-American art History and American art. Benjamin became the Associate Dean of the Division of Fine Arts in the College of Arts and Sciences at Howard University, and had served as Gallery Director.

== Early life ==
She was born on October 22, 1944, in Brinkley, Arkansas, to mother Addie (née Murph) and father Wesley E. Hayes, Sr. She attended secondary school at Horace Mann High School, where she graduated with honors. She went on to attend Howard University, where she met her husband, Donald S. Benjamin, a graphic artist and community activist.

== Publications ==
Benjamin wrote the book The Life and Art of Lois Mailou Jones, published by Pomegranate Artbooks, and had published over 20 articles and exhibition catalog essays including Profiles of Eleven African-American Artists and The Image of Women in the Work of Charles White, Three Generations of African American Women Sculptors: A Study in Paradox, an exhibition she also co-curated.

== Awards and honors ==
Benjamin received honors and awards for her scholarship including the Women's Caucus for Art Lifetime Achievement Award in 2010; the National Endowment for the Humanities Fellowship-in-Residence award; and also from the National Endowment for the Humanities, a fellowship for Faculty of Historical Black Colleges.
