= Dorothy B. Porter =

American librarian (1905–1995)

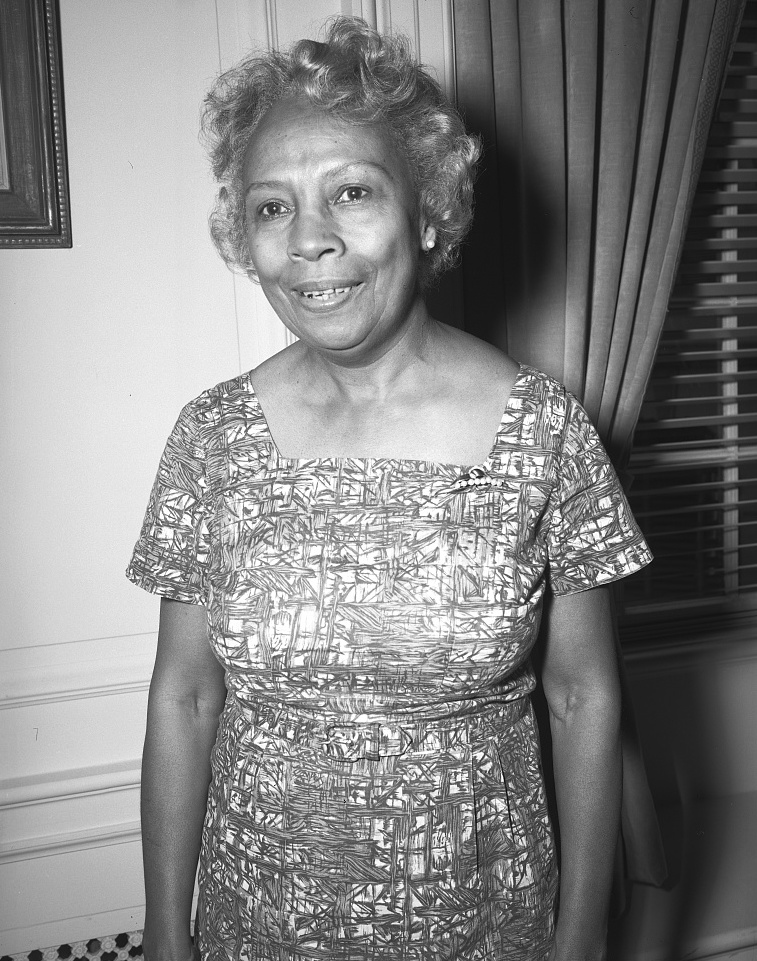
- Porter in 1970
- Born: Dorothy Burnett; May 25, 1905; Warrenton, Virginia, US
- Died: December 17, 1995 (aged 90); Broward County, Florida, US
- Other name: Dorothy Louise Porter Wesley
- Education: Howard University, 1928; Columbia University, B.S. 1931, M.S. in 1932 in library science
- Occupations: Librarian; Bibliographer; Curator
- Employer(s): Moorland-Spingarn Research Center, Howard University
- Known for: First African American to graduate from Columbia's library school; built Moorland-Spingarn Research Center into a world-class collection
- Spouse(s): James A. Porter (m. 1929–1970, his death); Charles H. Wesley (m. 1979–1987, his death)
- Children: 1

Dorothy Louise Porter Wesley (May 25, 1905 – December 17, 1995) was a librarian, bibliographer and curator, who built the Moorland-Spingarn Research Center at Howard University into a world-class research collection. She was the first African American to receive a library science degree from the Columbia University School of Library Service. Porter published numerous bibliographies on African American history. When she realized that the Dewey Decimal System had only two classification numbers for African Americans, one for slavery and one for colonization, she created a new classification system that ordered books by genre and author.

== Early life and education ==
Porter was born on May 25, 1905, in Warrenton, Virginia, the first of four children to Hayes J. Burnett and her husband. They encouraged their children to become educated and to serve their race.

Porter received a B.A. in 1928 from Howard University, a historically black college. During this time, she met James Amos Porter, an art historian and instructor in Howard's art department. They married in 1929, while she completed post-graduate work. She studied at Columbia University, earning B.S. in 1931 and M.S. in 1932 in library science.

== Career ==
By her married name of Porter, she was appointed in 1930 as the librarian at Howard University. Over the next 40 years, she was key to building up what is now the Moorland-Spingarn Research Center at the university as one of the world's best collection of library materials for Black/Africana history and culture.

Because of her limited budget, Porter appealed directly to publishers and book dealers to donate specific books to the library. She developed a worldwide network of contacts that reached from the US to Brazil, Mexico and Europe. Her friends and contacts included Alain Locke, Rayford Logan, Dorothy Peterson, Langston Hughes, and Amy Spingarn. The collection is international, with books and documents in many languages. It includes music and academic studies on linguistics, as well as literature and scholarship by and about Black people in the United States and elsewhere.

In addition, Porter was instrumental in ensuring scholars, such as Edison Carneiro, and statesmen, such as Kwame Nkrumah and Eric Williams, visited the university to increase students' interest in their African heritage.

Porter developed a new cataloging system for the growing collection, as well as expertise to assess the materials. Earlier librarians, notably Lula V. Allen, Edith Brown, Lula E. Connor and Rosa C. Hershaw, had started to develop a system suitable for the library's materials. Porter built on this to highlight genre and authors rather than to use the conventional Dewey Decimal Classification, which lacked appropriate class-marks.

When Arthur Spingarn agreed to sell his private collection to Howard University, the university's treasurer required an external appraisal of its value, stating that Porter's estimate would be over the value of the collection. Although Porter requested someone from the Library of Congress to do this, they acknowledged that they lacked expertise in the subject area. They asked her to write the report, which they certified and signed. This report was accepted by the university treasurer. This estimate set the standard for appraising collections of black literature.

== Honors and legacy ==
- 1994 Charles Frankel Prize in the Humanities - given to "Americans who have brought the humanities to a wide public audience"
- The Conover-Porter Award to recognize outstanding achievement in Africana bibliography and reference tools was installed in 1980 by the Africana Librarians Council of the African Studies Association. The award was established in honor of two pioneers in African Studies bibliography, Helen F. Conover, of the Library of Congress, and Dorothy B. Porter.
- The Dorothy Porter Wesley Award was established in 2018 by the Information Professionals of the Association for the Study of African American Life and History (ASALH) "to honor and document the outstanding work of Information Professionals; Bibliophiles, Librarians, Archivists, Curators and Collectors."

== Personal and later life ==
In 1929, Porter married James A. Porter, an historian and artist. He was the author of Modern Negro Art. They had a daughter together, Constance Porter Uzelac, known as "Coni". She married Milan Uzelac, and initially worked with her mother. She served as Executive Director of the Dorothy Porter Wesley Library. She later helped create the African American Research Library & Cultural Center in Fort Lauderdale, Florida.

James Porter died on February 28, 1970. Several years later, in 1979, Burnett Porter married Charles Wesley, an American historian and educator who pioneered important studies in black history. He died in 1987.

Dorothy Porter died on December 17, 1995, aged 90, in Fort Lauderdale, Florida.

== Selected publications ==
Dorothy Porter published numerous bibliographies and one anthology.

- Wesley, Dorothy Porter. Afro-American Writings Published Before 1835: With an Alphabetical List (Tentative) of Imprints Written by American Negroes, 1760–1835. [New York]: Columbia University, 1932. Thesis (M. Sc.)--Columbia University, New York, 1932. OCLC 12747472
- Porter, Dorothy B. "A Library on the Negro". The American Scholar, Vol. 7, No. 1: pp. 115–117. 1938. ISSN 0003-0937 OCLC 5543366780
- Porter, Dorothy B. "A Library on the Negro". The Journal of Negro Education, Vol. 10, No. 2: pp. 264–266. April 1941. ISSN 0022-2984 OCLC 5545408903
- Forten, James, John T. Hilton, and William Wells Brown. "Early Manuscript Letters Written by Negroes". The Journal of Negro History, Vol. 24, No. 2: pp. 199–210. 1939. ISSN 0022-2992 OCLC 5545495349
- Wesley, Dorothy Porter, and Arthur Alfonso Schomburg. North American Negro Poets, A Bibliographical Checklist of Their Writings, 1760-1944. Hattiesburg, Miss: Book farm, 1945. OCLC 382999
- Moorland Foundation, and Dorothy Porter Wesley. A Catalogue of the African Collection in the Moorland Foundation, Howard University Library. Washington: Howard University Press, 1958. OCLC 577265
- Porter, Dorothy B. The Negro in the United States; A Selected Bibliography. Compiled by Dorothy B. Porter. Washington, Library of Congress, 1970. Available at Project Gutenberg, 2011. OCLC 746985433
- Wesley, Dorothy Porter. Early Negro Writing, 1760-1837. Boston: Beacon Press, 1971. ISBN 978-0-807-05452-9 OCLC 251341
  - An anthology rare documents of Negro history, including addresses, narratives, poems, essays and documents from fraternal and mutual aid organizations and educational improvement societies.
- Porter, Dorothy B. "Bibliography and Research in Afro-American Scholarship". Journal of Academic Librarianship, Vol. 2, No. 2: pp. 77–81. 1976. OCLC 424794640
- Moorland-Spingarn Research Center, and Dorothy Porter Wesley. Recent Notable Books: A Selected Bibliography in Honor of Dorothy Burnett Porter. [Washington]: Howard University, Moorland-Spingarn Research Center, 1974. OCLC 1818615
- Newman, Richard. Black Access: A Bibliography of Afro-American Bibliographies. Westport, Conn: Greenwood Press, 1984. ISBN 978-0-313-23282-4 OCLC 9557811
- Nell, William Cooper; Wesley, Dorothy Porter; Uzelac, Constance Porter (2002). William Cooper Nell, Nineteenth-Century African American Abolitionist, Historian, Integrationist: Selected Writings from 1832–1874. Baltimore, MD: Black Classic Press. ISBN 978-1-57478-019-2. OCLC 50673509.
