= Douglas Walla =

American art collector (born 1951)

- Born: California, United States
- Known for: Contemporary Art, Art Gallery, Museums

Douglas Walla (born 1951) is an American art collector.

== Biography ==
Following formal studies for an MFA degree in studio and art theory with Charles Gaines, Walla curated several exhibitions in California from 1973 to 1976, including Masterworks of Modern Sculpture (from the collections of the San Francisco Museum of Modern Art, and the late Ben Deane of Southern California), 200 Years of American Painting, and the first traveling survey of large scale paintings by Alex Katz. Before leaving the West Coast he would also have several regional museum shows of his own fine art in California.

In 1976, Walla relocated to New York City where he would become the vice-president of Marlborough Gallery and coordinated the exhibitions and activities for Francis Bacon, Larry Rivers, Alex Katz, Red Grooms, and the Estates of Jacques Lipchitz and Barbara Hepworth. In 1985, Mr. Walla opened a new gallery on the corner of Madison & 57th Street named Kent Fine Art. Along with organizing and curating over two hundred exhibitions, he has produced and published over fifty books on modern and contemporary art. Projects have included Dennis Adams: The Architecture of Amnesia, Herbert Bayer: Bauhaus and Beyond, Eugène Carrière: The Symbol of Creation, John Heartfield: AIZ/VI 1930–1938, Francis Picabia: Accommodations of Desire, Medardo Rosso: Impressions in Wax and Bronze, Dorothea Tanning: Insomnias, and more. The gallery would represent the surrealists Dorothea Tanning and Meret Oppenheim, The Estate of Herbert Bayer (Bauhaus), conceptual artists of conscience including Dennis Adams, Chris Burden, Llyn Foulkes, Antoni Muntadas, Irving Petlin, Judith Shea and many others.

Outreach activities have included the Venice Biennale project by Emily Prince entitled "American Servicemen and Women Who Have Died in Iraq and Afghanistan (but Not Including the Wounded, nor the Iraqis nor the Afghans)," which documented over 3900 casualties in drawing form, which favorably reviewed by the International Herald Tribune, The New York Times, and New York Magazine along with European journals. Walla also organized exhibition support for the recent retrospectives for Antoni Muntadas, Llyn Foulkes, and Paul Laffoley. His most recent writing and archival project is The Essential Paul Laffoley published by the University of Chicago Press documenting paintings and journals executed over the previous four decades. The publication is the culmination of 27 years of archiving the original texts and works of art of Paul Laffoley, an important visionary artist. He also oversaw the development of a website dedicated to the 125 discovered handwritten journals of Paul Laffoley.

In 2017, the activities of Kent Fine Art were summarized in the redesign and comprehensive website containing the archives of over 200 curatorial projects, 50 publications and numerous research projects. Given a 30-year back catalogue of exhibitions, it was also a convenient method to access the gallery history. Particular focus was given to Surrealism, Symbolism and Dada, and to contemporary artists of conscience, and institutional critique as well as conceptual rigor. Presently he serves as Executor of the Estate of Paul Laffoley, and is compiling research on the oeuvre of Irving Petlin, and developing a forthcoming monograph documenting 40 years of street architecture, interventions, and video installations of Dennis Adams.
