= Morton Dimondstein =

American artist and activist (1920–2000)

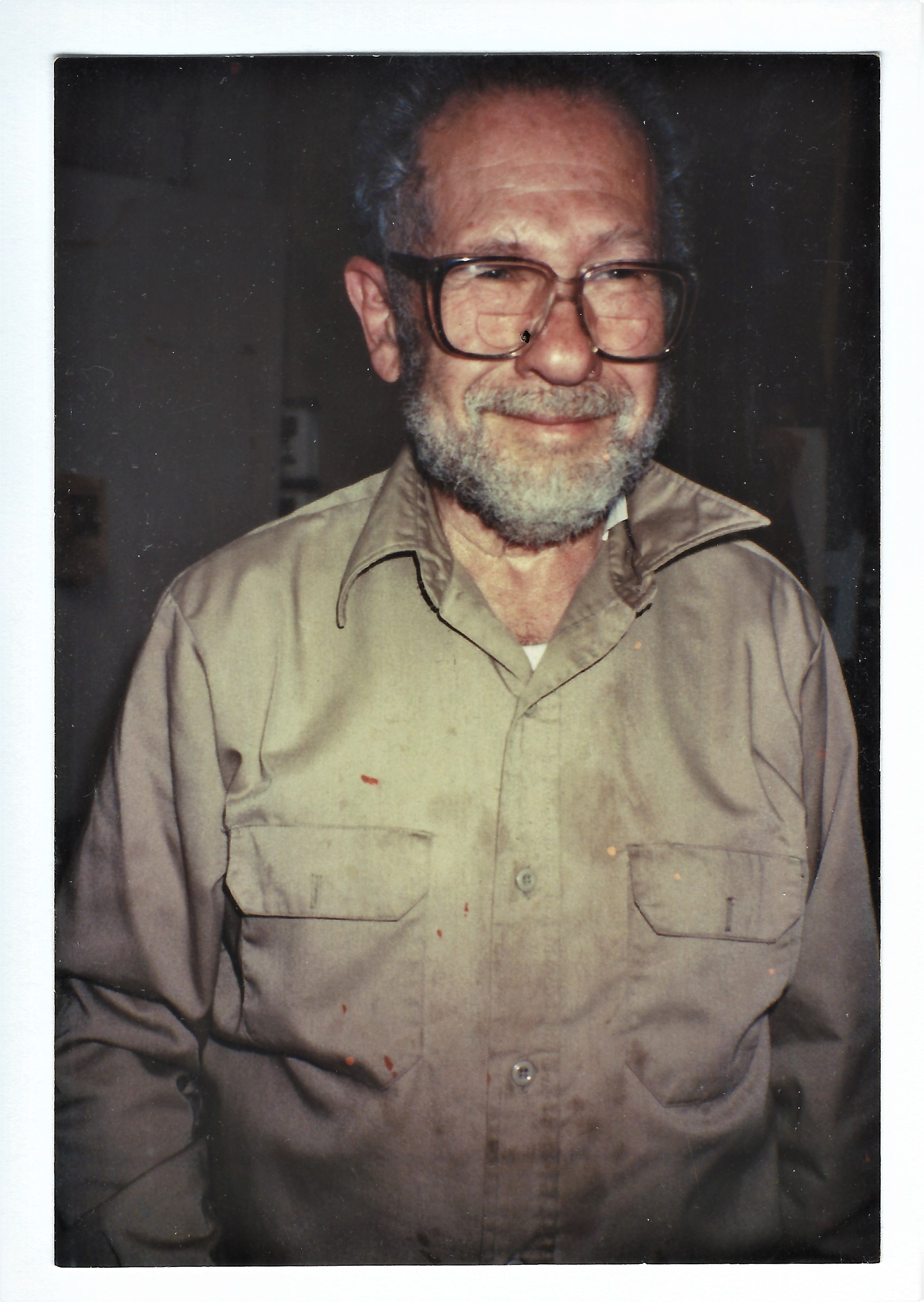
- Born: November 5, 1920; New York City, U.S.
- Died: November 27, 2000 (aged 80); Los Angeles, U.S.
- Education: American Artists School
- Known for: Painting, sculpture, woodcuttings, serigraph, activism
- Movement: Social Realism

Morton Dimondstein (November 5, 1920 – November 27, 2000) was an American painter, sculptor, printmaker, woodcutter, and activist who lived in the United States, Mexico, and Italy over the course of his life and career. One of his self-portraits is held by the Library of Congress and his screenprint work Industrial Scene #1 (1948) is in the National Gallery of Art. Dimondstein is the father of three children and adoptive father of notable feminist philosopher, author, and speaker, Susan Griffin.

== Life ==
Dimondstein was raised in a secular, Yiddish-speaking and culturally Jewish home in New York City.

In 1942 he married fellow artist and activist Miriam "Mimi" Green, who followed him to Colorado Springs and Camp Adair in Oregon before he was deployed with the 104th Infantry Division. They divorced in 1948. Dimondstein's second wife was Geraldine "Red" Holtzman, dancer and professor of arts education who he married in 1950. They remained married until his death in 2000.

== Education ==
Dimondstein enrolled in the American Artists School and the Art Students League in New York City. During this time, he studied printmaking, drawing, and painting with Kimon Nicolaïdes, Anton Refregier, and Harry Sternberg.

In 1939, Dimondstein was a member of the Youth Workshop in New York, an affiliate group of the American Youth Congress. It consisted of about 100 members who organized around a mutual interest in cultural work. During this time, he fraternized with Pete Seeger. Their relationship would be the subject of an interview conducted by the Federal Bureau Investigation during an investigation of Seeger for his communist affiliation. When interviewed by Counterintelligence Corps agent Jack H. Dunn, Dimondstein reported that both he and Seeger had been to multiple Communist Party meetings, but that Dimondstein was not a member and was unsure if Seeger had been. Of their relationship to the Party, the CIC agent reported, "Dimondstein, in explaining the reasons for [Seeger]'s Communistic leanings, stated that it must be realized that he was only speaking from his own experience and what he knew of [Seeger], but that in his opinion [Seeger] was only interested in the Communistic party from the standpoint of securing their backing for a program of subsidization of the cultural professions such as artists and musicians. He explained that in his opinion this was the basis of most artists' interest in the Communist party as under their program the artist had an opportunity to produce his works without worry of starving to death, as they were subsidized by the government for such work."

After relocating to Los Angeles, Dimondstein enrolled at the Otis College of Art and Design (then the Otis Art Institute), studying painting with Paul Clemens and Boris Deutsch.

== Military service ==
Dimondstein served in the 104th Infantry Division in the 387th Field Artillery Battalion as a forward observer and fire director center operator. During his service, Dimondstein was interviewed by the Federal Bureau of Investigation for his association with Pete Seeger, who was the primary focus of their investigation.

== Career ==
=== Los Angeles ===
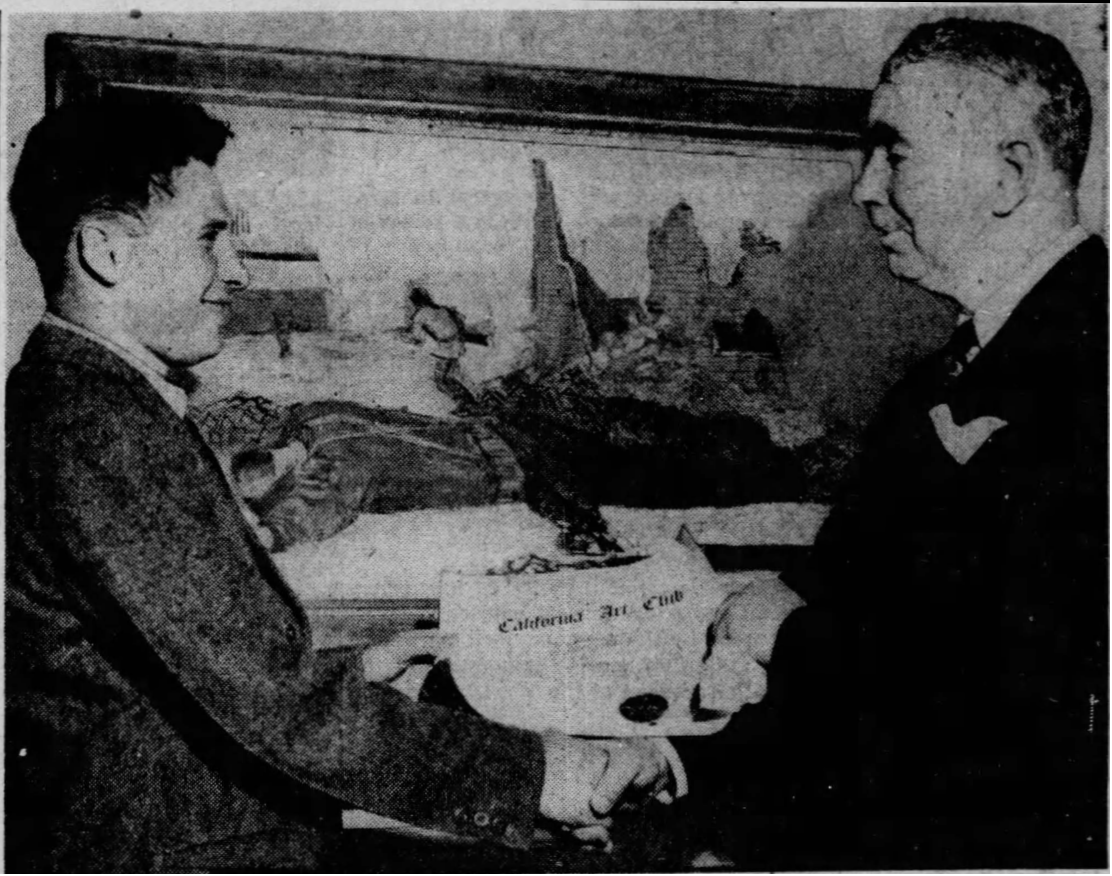
Dimondstein, left, receives first prize from Edward Withers, head of the California Art Club, for his oil painting The Attack (1946), a vivid impression of a "wounded buddy" amid the rubble of a German town.

Dimondstein's oil painting “The Attack,” which depicts a "wounded buddy" in a razed German town, was awarded first place by the California Art Club in 1946 at the First Annual G.I. Art Exhibit at the Los Angeles Museum. Attendees were confounded by the simplified color scheme and distorted proportions, and were perplexed that it merited the award. A local news article published after the event speculated that the controversy stemmed from a prevailing lack of appreciation for the significance of simplicity in modern design techniques, which was becoming increasingly evident in the creation of furniture, houses, movie sets, and various objects of the era.

Dimondstein, along with many other actors, screenwriters, and artists, were blacklisted due to McCarthyism.

Dimondstein started the Fraymart Gallery on Melrose avenue in 1948 with his then-wife Miriam, art dealer Felix Landau, and Manny Singer. There, they sold original, affordable serigraphs (silkscreen prints). Dimondstein's 21-color "Ocean Park Pier" was selected by the Carnegie Institute as one of the 100 best prints in 1947. This serigraph, along with others by Miriam Dimondstein, were exhibited at Fraymart Gallery in June 1948. At the time, the pair were considered leaders in the new art medium.

=== Mexico (1951–1954) ===
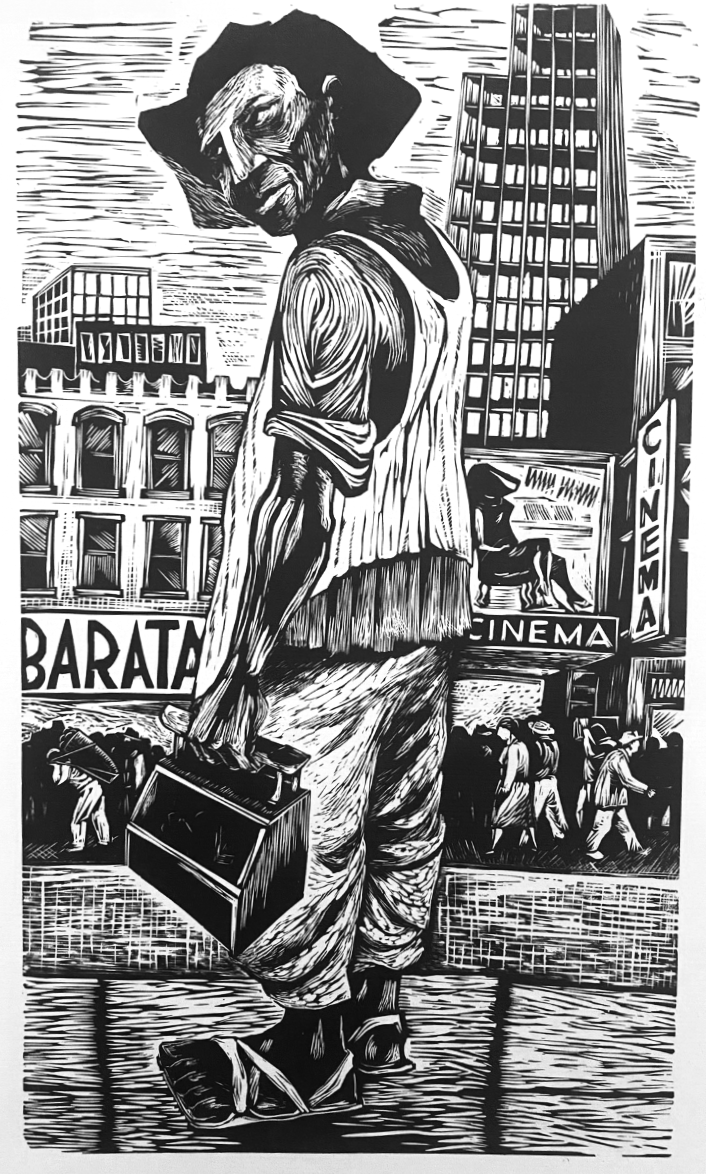
Woodcut engraving with social realism from Morton Dimondstein Portfolio of Engravings (1951).

Dimondstein, along with his second wife Geraldine "Red" Dimondstein, were blacklisted during the worst years of McCarthyism, which made it difficult for them to sell their work. They were members of the Communist Party and Marxists by social ideology. The FBI's investigations into Dimondstein continued during this time, which included visits to their home by presumed federal agents meant to intimidate. Media attention to their works was censored.

To avoid the blacklist, Dimondstein and his family moved to Mexico in 1951. There, he attended the Instituto Politécnico Nacional, where he worked with the renown muralist David Alfaro Siqueiros. Siqueros penned a personal recommendation for Dimondstein, which was also published in A Collection of Engravings by Morton Dimondstein (1952):

At the beginning of his career his work was abstract, influenced by the Paris School. Gradually, along with Picasso, Leger and others, but without the obstacles that have impeded the older painters, Morton Dimondstein, with the advantage of youth, faced the objectivity in art; a thing which has been lost as a collective impulse since the end of the Renaissance.

— David Alfaro Siquieros, Letter of Recommendation for Morton Dimondstein

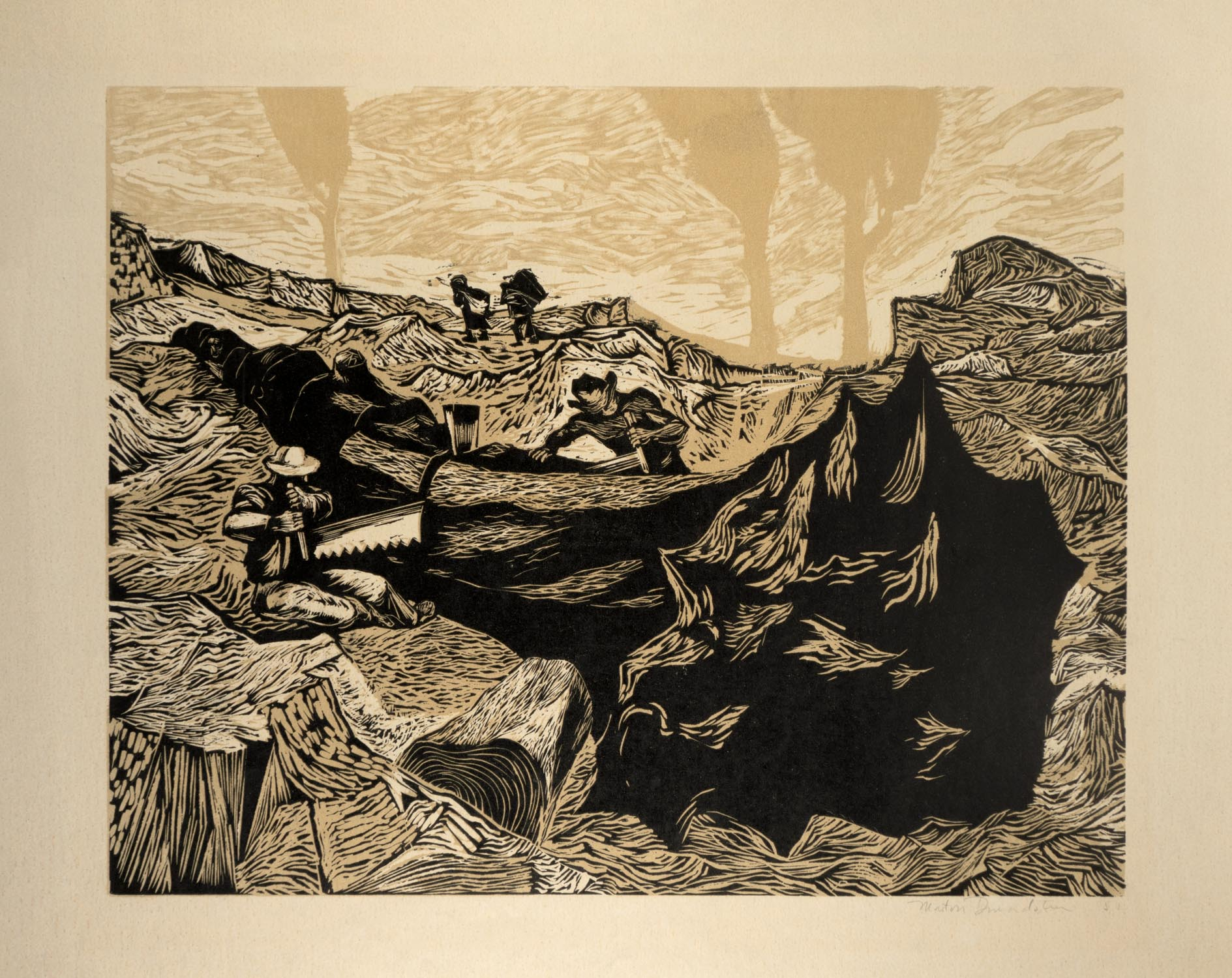
Taladores (1951) by Morton Dimondstein, created while living Mexico.

While in Mexico, Dimondstein was a member of the artist print collective, the Taller de Gráfica Popular, a collective founded in 1937 by artists Leopoldo Méndez, Pablo O'Higgins, and Luis Arenal. During his three years in Mexico, Dimondstein also worked as a staff artist and instructor in visual education for UNESCO

=== Los Angeles ===
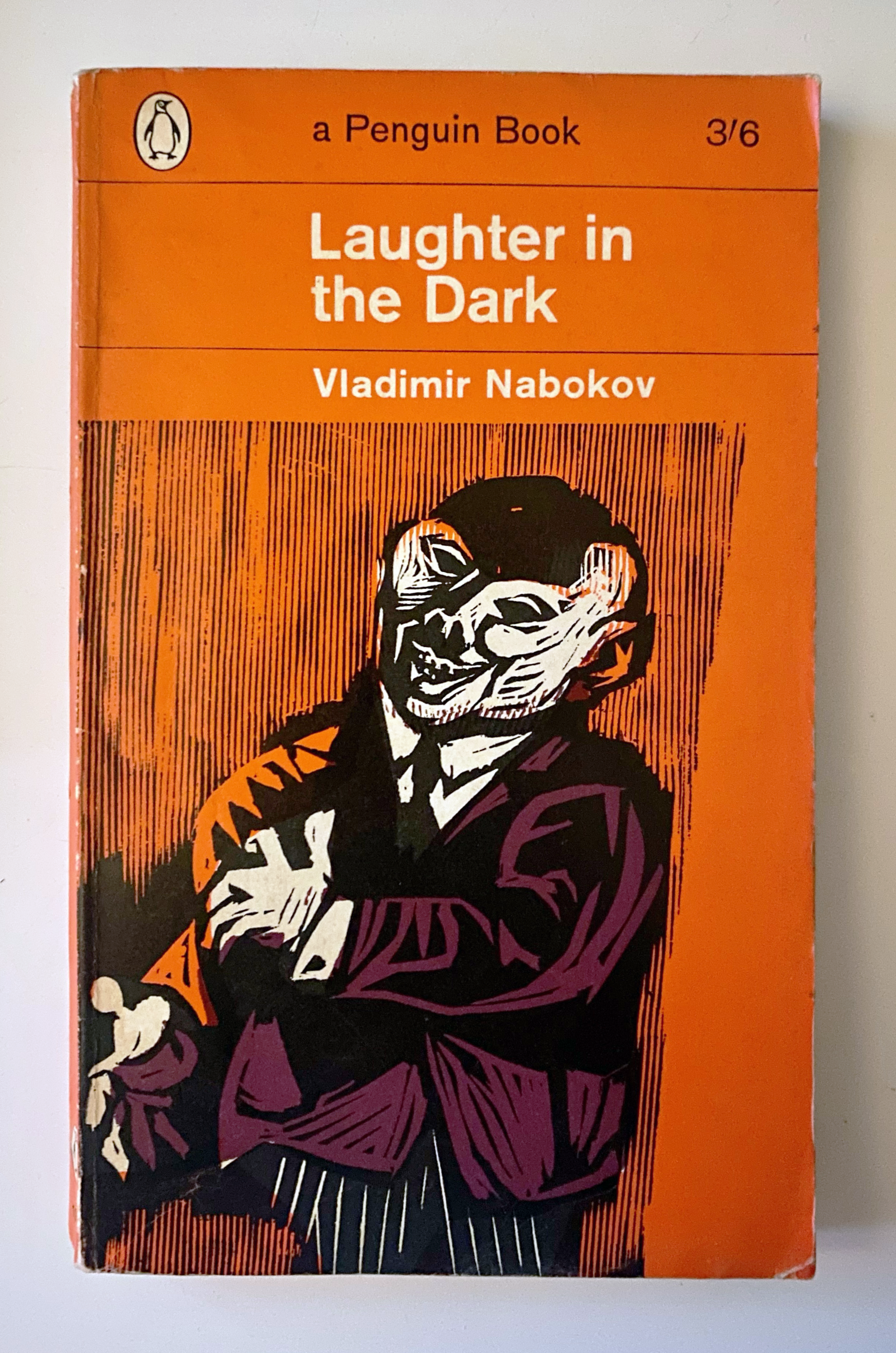
The 1963 cover of Laughter in the Dark by Vladimir Nobokov as illustrated by Morton Dimondstein in woodcut style.

Dimondstein was the art editor for multiple editions of The California Quarterly from 1953 to 1956, which published works by various local artists and poets, including Thomas McGrath.

Dimondstein worked for the advertising firm headed by Saul Bass, designing books jackets and collaborating on advertisement campaigns for films, including Otto Preminger's Saint Joan (1957) and William Wyler's The Big Country (1958).

Dimondstein created woodcut covers used for two Vladimir Nabokov stories published by Penguin Books, The Real Life of Sebastian Knight and Laughter in the Dark.

Dimondstein continued to receive recognition in his work into the 60s.

Dimondstein would continue to paint through the 1960s. Moving away from painting oil on canvas, he painted portraits using acrylic on paper with a “sure sense of composition...ability to exploit color as a formal device...and a free spirited feeling for improvisation” (Los Angeles Times, October 18, 1986).

Dimondstein worked closely with friend and fellow artist, Martin Lubner. A shared exhibition for their work was established at the Norton Simon Museum from November 15 to December 31, 1960.

Dimondstein created a woodcut portrait of Tal Farlow that was used for the cover of his 1959 album release, The Guitar Artistry of Tal Farlow.

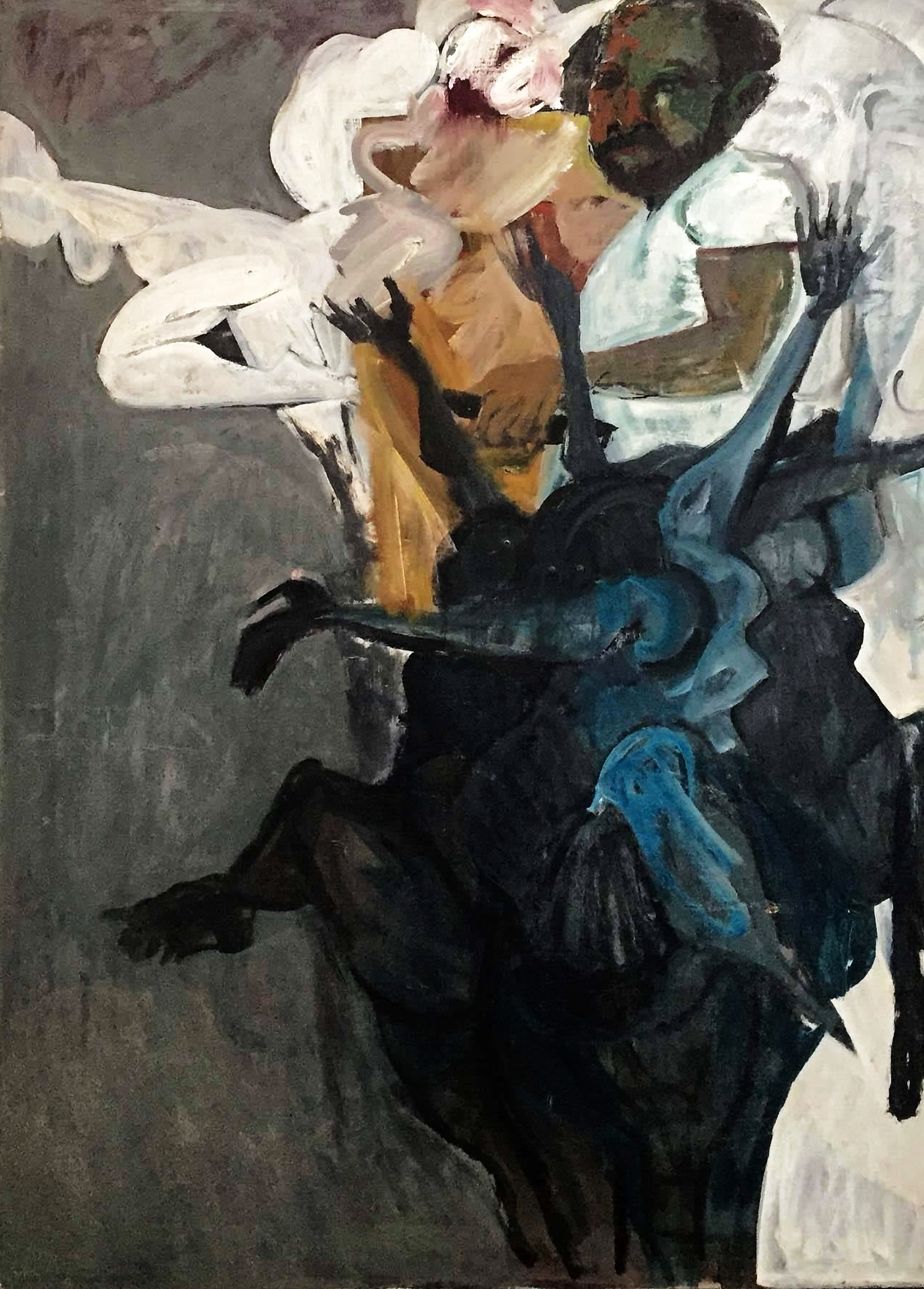
The Artist at Work (1955), self portrait. The painting depicts a sculpture in the foreground reminiscent of his series, The Three Graces.

=== Italy (1960–1964) ===
Dimondstein and his family moved to Italy in 1960. During his time in Italy, Dimondstein continued to create using print and paint, but his focus transitioned to sculpture. He would sculpt using wax and then cast the wax in bronze. Most of his sculpted works during this time centered on the nude or semi-nude human form. The Three Graces, a series of three sculpted works, abstracts multiple bodies and body parts into a blossoming knot. This series is canonized by Dimondstein in one of his self-portraits, The Artist at Work (c.1955), which depicts Dimondstein working behind a sculpted blossom of limbs. He also sculpted with wood and polyester resin.

=== Los Angeles (1964–2000) ===
Dimondstein had established The School of Fine Art, where he taught and worked alongside photographer Harry Drinkwater, and artists Arnold Mesches, Ted Gilien, Keith Fitch, and Martin Lubner. Later, he also taught drawing and sculpture at the University of Southern California. Notable artist Jesse Lott was a student of the school, where he learned directly from Dimondstein.

== Activism ==
Dimondstein signed a petition within the 1942 State-Wide Nominating Petitions and List of Signatures and Addresses, which was filed by the Communist Party with the Secretary of State in the State of New York.

Dimondstein was identified as a sponsor of the Los Angeles Committee for Protection of Foreign Born.

Dimondstein taught classes at the California Labor School in 1949.

Dimondstein was on the board of directors for the Artists For Economic Action.

Morton Dimondstein was a member of the Los Angeles Artist's Protest Committee, his name appearing on a two-page protest article published in the Los Angeles Free Press in 1965. His name also appears on Stop We Dissent (1965), an iconic sign held up by protestors at the Los Angeles County Museum of Art. Dimondstein's name appears on a list of artists who participated in the Peace Tower showcase in 1966, a collaborative art demonstration organized by Irving Petlin and members of the Artist's Protest Committee. It is likely that he contributed his own panel, though this is unverified.

== African Tribal Art ==
He established Dimondstein Tribal Arts in 1970.

Dimondstein's son Joshua partnered with him in 1996.
