= Kent Fine Art =

Art gallery in New York City

Coordinates: 40.749788°N 74.006044°W

Kent Fine Art is an art gallery in New York City founded in 1985 by Douglas Walla.

== About ==
Founded in 1985, Kent Fine Art opened at the corner of Madison & 57th Street in the Fuller Building, New York. Since 57th Street, the gallery has maintained galleries in Soho, and the Chelsea arts district in New York. Early exhibitions and publications focused on the lifetime sculpture of Medardo Rosso, the surrealists Meret Oppenheim and Dorothea Tanning, the catalogue raisonne for John Heartfield AIZ/VI, and the last lifetime show of Henry Moore: From Model to Monument. All of the works mentioned above were placed in museum collections in the United States, Europe and Japan. Contemporary research and exhibitions focused most notably on Dennis Adams, Antoni Muntadas and Pablo Helguera, along with painters Llyn Foulkes, Irving Petlin, the Boston Visionary Paul Laffoley and the metaphysical photography of John Brill. Along with an active publication program, KFA’s web presence began in 1997 largely as a publishing vehicle that was more efficient in distribution than by mail.

In 2017, Kent Fine Art launched a redesigned and comprehensive website containing the archives of the gallery artists’ collaborations. Given a 30 year back catalogue of exhibitions, it was also a convenient method to access the gallery history. Given the advances in digital technology as well as the use of hand-held devices for collecting information, the aim was to create a user friendly, and efficient platform to share their archives with the public. Artists and exhibitions presented ranged from Surrealism, Symbolism and Dada, to more current artists of conscience, and institutional critique as well as conceptual rigor. Kent Fine Art attempted to provide economic value to collectors by providing thoughtful basis regarding decisions about art rather than financial engineering or gaming the system.

Along with gallery sales of modern and contemporary art, curating programs and exhibitions, recent projects include the completion of The Essential Paul Laffoley University of Chicago Press following the death of the artist in 2016, research concerning the oeuvre of Irving Petlin, and the development of a major monograph documenting 40 years of street architecture, interventions, and video of Dennis Adams.

== Publications and exhibition catalogues ==
- Altered States Curated By Rosetta Brooks And Selected Texts (1989)
- American Myths (1987)
- Artschwager/shapiro/byars (1988)
- Assemblage (1987)
- Dennis Adams: The Architecture Of Amnesia Text By Mary Anne Staniszewski (1989)
- Dennis Adams: Double Feature (2008)
- Dennis Adams: Malraux’s Shoes (2012)
- Herbert Bayer: Bauhaus And Beyond Text By D K Walla
- Varujan Boghosian: Baster Bricoleur Text Notes By Katrina Neumann (2015)
- The Photography Of John Brill Text By Leah Ollman
- Eugène Carrière: The Symbol Of Creation Text By Robert Rosenblum & Robert Bantens (1989)
- Mike Cockrill: Awakening Text By Anthon Hayden-guest (2011)
- Mike Cockrill: Existential Man (2013)
- Matthew Cusick: The Map Paintings (2004)
- Entre Et Chien Et Loup Curated By D.k. Walla (2008)
- Leandro Erlich: Turismo With Judy Werthein
- Heide Fasnacht: Drawn To Sublime Text By Nancy Princenthal
- Heide Fasnacht: Loot (2012)
- Fictions Curated And Text By Douglas Blau (1987)
- Important African & Modern Masterworks (1992)
- Llyn Foulkes: The Sixties Text By Peter Selz (1987)
- Llyn Foulkes: Scrapbook 1957 – 2005 (2007)
- Llyn Foulkes: Bloody Heads (2011)
- Julio Gonalez: Drawn From The Studio 1876-1942 (2007)
- John Heartfield: Aiz/vi 1930-1938 Text By David Evans (1992)
- Jerry Kearns: Risky Business Text By Lucy R. Lippard (1987)
- Paul Laffoley: The Phenomenology Of Revelation (1989)
- Paul Laffoley: The Boston Visionary Cell (2013)
- Paul Laffoley: Premonitions Of The Bauharoque With The Henry Art Gallery (2013)
- Paul Laffoley: Time Phase X (2005)
- Paul Laffoley: The Force Structure Of The Mystical Experience (2015)
- The Essential Paul Laffoley With The University Of Chicago Press (2016)
- Mind The Gap Curated By D.k. Walla (2012)
- Henry Moore: From Model To Monument (1987)
- Beverly Mciver: Invisible Me Text By Irving Sandler
- Metaphor: Stout, tuttle, Wentworth, Knowlton Curated By Susan Harris (1987)
- Muntadas: Eleven (2012)
- Of Absence And Presence Curated By D. K. Walla (1987)
- Meret Oppenheim Text By Bice Curiger (1988)
- Paste Up (1995)
- Irving Petlin: Weisswald Text By Edward Fry (1987)
- Irving Petlin: Pastels 1961-1987 Text By Paul Cummings (1990)
- Irving Petlin: An Artist Of Conscience (2009)
- Francis Picabia: Accommodations Of Desire Text By Sarah Wilson (1988)
- Richard Prince: Inside World Curated By Thea Westreich (1989)
- Reality Remade Curated By D. K. Walla (1986)
- Revisiting Histories Text Notes By J M Wasilik (2014)
- Medardo Rosso: Impressions In Wax And Bronze Text By Luciano Caramel (1988)
- Judith Shea Photo Essay By Elyse Harary Text Notes By J M Wasilik (2014)
- Myron Stout With Richard Bellamy (1990)
- Dorothea Tanning: On Paper Text By Donald Kuspit (1987)
- Dorothea Tanning: Eleven Paintings Text By Pontius Hulten (1988)
- Dorothea Tanning: Insomnias 1954-1965 Text By Charles Stuckey (2005)
- Dorothea Tanning And Friends Curated With Tanning (2009)
- The Times, The Chronicle & The Observer Curated By Douglas Blau (1990)
- Visionaries Curated By D. K. Walla With Photo Essay By David Finn (1987)
