= Los Angeles Institute of Contemporary Art =

Former artistic exhibition venue

Coordinates: 34.0583°N 118.4148°W

- Established: 1974
- Dissolved: 1987
- Location: 2000 Avenue of the Stars; Century City, California United States
- Type: Nonprofit Organization
- Founder: Robert Smith

The Los Angeles Institute of Contemporary Art (LAICA) was an exhibition venue for visual arts that ran between 1974 and 1987 (approximately) in Los Angeles, California. It played an important role in showing experimental work of the era as well as supporting the careers of young artists in Los Angeles.

== Founding ==
LAICA's primary mission was to support contemporary artists of the area through a democratic organizational structure that responded to a large and diverse but then-underrepresented local arts community. To minimize operating expenses and remain flexible to the shifting arts population, LAICA's directors chose not to establish a permanent collection and eschewed expensive exhibition venues in order to prioritize the needs of artists over those of dealers and curators.

The Los Angeles Institute of Contemporary Art is a new concept designed to be a catalyst for the support and recognition of contemporary art in Southern California. [...] An exhibition program reflecting many concepts of high artistic achievement uses visiting curators from all sectors of the community and open, depoliticized selection processes.

LAICA's board of directors included notable artists, art critics and gallery owners, including John Baldessari, Rosamund Felsen and Peter Plagens. Committees specifically in charge of exhibition programming were member-elected, and the duties of curator and editor (of the exhibition space and journal, respectively) rotated among members instead of belonging to permanent staff. Noted collector and MOCA LA co-founder Marcia Simon Weisman helped LAICA find free exhibition space.

== Exhibition Venues ==
The organization began in 1971 with a registry of slides and biographical materials open to submission by any artist of Southern California. LAICA opened its first exhibition space in Fall 1974 with a 4,200 square feet area on the fifth floor of the ABC Entertainment Complex in Century City, an unbuilt-out space that they were able to rent for $1.00 a year. Earlier, in June of the same year, LAICA also released the first issue of LAICA Journal.

Exhibitions at LAICA's exhibition space covered a wide variety of media, from contemporary painting and sculpture to performance art, video and music. Exhibitions at this space included Three L.A. Sculptors: Lloyd Hamrol, George Herms, and Bruce Nauman in 1975 and Imagination in 1976, which was curated by Llyn Foulkes.

In 1976, LAICA lost the lease to their Century City location. By March 1977 they reopened in 2020 South Robertson Boulevard in an 8000 square foot location. Continuing its mission to showcase a wide range of contemporary art practices, both local and international, exhibitions here included a west coast showing of the groundbreaking exhibition PIctures (1978-1979), curated by Douglas Crimp, as well as Mike Mandel and Larry Sultan's Evidence, and solo shows by artists such as Eleanor Antin, Suzanne Lacy, and the performance art duo Bob & Bob.

== LAICA Journal ==
LAICA's cofounders saw the publication of a journal as pivotal to their mission of supporting experimental artistic practices, seeing print as an alternative form of distribution that supported or even replaced the goals of their exhibition space. In fact, LAICA began the Journal before opening their exhibition space. LAICA cofounder Robert Smith recalled an early meeting with local artists in which Billy Al Bengston reportedly noted, "We don't need another gallery. What we need is a magazine." As Smith and former Artforum critic Fidel Danieli began the Journal, they focused its pages on the history and identity of the Los Angeles artistic community, publishing writings and works by local artists such as Guy de Cointet, Rachel Rosenthal, Allan Kaprow, Allan Sekula, Martha Rosler and Judy Chicago. Articles and issues often focused on negotiating the region; for example, Joni Gordon published "ARTFROM," a chart of Los Angeles galleries from 1963 - 1974, in the Journal's first issue; and Eleanor Antin guest-edited the fourth issue, centering its contents as answers to the question of why artists choose to move or stay in the region, when it was not a center of the international art world (as was New York City).

== Closing ==
In the late 1970s, LAICA was flourishing with an increased budget and staff, opening a second space at 815 Traction Avenue—the "Downtown Gallery"—and an additional storefront space in the Eastern Columbia building, donated by state Senator Alan Sieroty. However, the decrease in public funding for the art in the early 1980s forced LAICA to cut some of its public programs, though it continued to present ambitious exhibitions.

In early 1985, Robert Smith resigned from his director position, which he had held since LAICA's founding. The directors replaced Smith with Ben Marks, the former director of the Center for Contemporary Art in Seattle; however, he resigned less than a year later. At the same time, forced by financial burdens, LAICA's board of directors decided to sell the space on South Robertson Boulevard. They staged temporary exhibitions in various locations for the next two years, but finally closed in 1987.
