= Levogyre =

Levogyre can refer to:

- In chemistry and physics, a synonym of levorotation,
- In astronomy, the Levogyre is the long since discredited structure of the Universe proposed by ancient Greek astronomer Eudoxus of Cnidus: A series of nested crystalline spheres which contains fixed stars and moving planets which rotate around an immovable Earth with each sphere connected a randomly distributed series by gimbal-like axes.
- In art, The Levogyre is a 1974 painting by Paul Laffoley depicting a series of nested shells connected by gimbals.
