= Pablo Helguera =

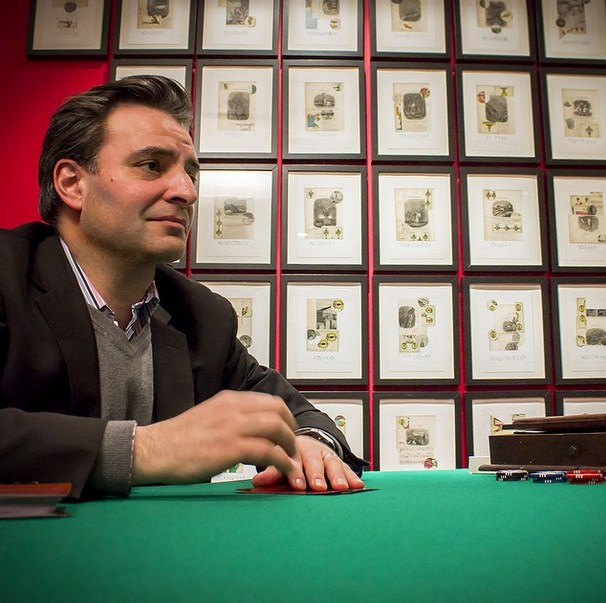
- Pablo Helguera, "Strange Oasis" at Kent Fine Art, March 2015
- Born: April 25, 1971 (age 54); Mexico City
- Known for: Sculpture, performance, installation, collage

Pablo Helguera (born April 25, 1971, Mexico City) is an artist, performer, author, and educator. From 2007 to 2020 he was director of adult and academic programs at the Museum of Modern Art in New York City. He currently is an assistant professor at The New School College of Performing Arts.

== Biography ==
Following his BFA degree at the School of the Art Institute of Chicago and employment with the Museum of Contemporary Art of Chicago, Helguera relocated to New York on the invitation of the Guggenheim Museum to join the department of education where he remained for eight years while beginning his career as an exhibiting artist. In 2012, Helguera received a PhD degree from Kingston University in London, and refined his role as an educator with engagement by the Museum of Modern Art.

Helguera has been the recipient of numerous awards for his art and his ideas concerning social practice art, including the Guggenheim Foundation, the Rockefeller Foundation/Fideicomiso para la Cultura Mexico, Creative Capital, a Franklin Furnace Fellowship and most recently a Blade of Grass Award from the Rubin Museum in New York.

Pablo Helguera is represented by Kent Fine Art in New York.

== Work ==
Helguera began exhibiting as an artist in Mexico City in 1998, and for the first time in New York at the Bronx Museum of Art as well as the Museo del Barrio in 2001. Since that time, he has completed over 50 One Person Exhibitions and Performances throughout the United States, Mexico, Colombia, Croatia, Belgium, Puerto Rico, Italy, the United Kingdom and most recently Germany. Helguera has also authored over 18 publications including Education for Socially Engaged Art: A Materials and Techniques Handbook, The Pablo Helguera Manual of Contemporary Art Style, What in the World: A Museum’s Subjective Biography, The School of Panamerican Unrest, both in English as well as Spanish.

One recent project, Libreria Donceles, comments on the vanishing culture of the bookstore, the passage of personal libraries to new users, but more importantly the vanishing availability of books in the Spanish language. The project was assembled by the artist with Kent Fine Art in New York. By rendering visibility to the Spanish language in an American city, Librería Donceles affirms the importance of the cultural dimension of the language and raises questions about how Spanish might be reconnected to its diaspora, as well as integrated into the broader cultural life of New York. Donceles has subsequently travelled to the Arizona State University Art Museum, the Kadist Art Foundation in San Francisco, Red Hook, New York (now) with the sponsorship of Blade of Grass, and soon to the Henry Art Gallery in Seattle, Washington.

Helguera's work has been described as "socially engaged", creating works engaging communities in local or global issues.

Helguera was the head of public programs in the education department of the Guggenheim Museum from 1998-2007, and the director of adult and academic programs at the New York Museum of Modern Art from 2007-2019, prior to his appointment at the New School.

From 2 November 2021 - 15 January 2022, the Museu Fundación Juan March, Palma exhibited Pablo Helguera: la comedia del arte. The show later traveled to Museo de Arte Abstracto Español, Cuenca, from 10 February - 8 May 2022.

== Projects ==
- The School of Panamerican Unrest, 2005
- Librería Donceles, 2013
- Parable Conference, 2014. First presented at the Brooklyn Academy of Music (BAM) with a second iteration in the form of an installation in the exhibition, "Strange Oasis" at Kent Fine Art.
- Nuevo Romancero Nuevomejicano, 2014. First presented at SITE Santa Fe with a second iteration in the exhibition, "Strange Oasis" at Kent Fine Art.

== Books ==
- Helguera, Pablo (2011). Education for Socially Engaged Art: A Materials and Techniques Handbook. New York: Jorge Pinto. ISBN 978-1-934978-59-7.
- Helguera, Pablo (2007). The Pablo Helguera Manual of Contemporary Art Style. New York: J. Pinto Books, 2007. ISBN 978-0-9790766-0-2.
- Helguera, Pablo (2009). Artoons. New York: J. Pinto Books, 2009. ISBN 978-1-934978-10-8.
- Helguera, Pablo (2009). Artoons 2. New York: J. Pinto Books, 2009. ISBN 978-1-934978-23-8.
- Helguera, Pablo (2010). Artoons 3. New York: J. Pinto Books, 2010. ISBN 978-1-934978-49-8.
