= Bob & Bob =

Performance art duo

Bob & Bob outtake from The Fab Two photo shoot, 1977.

Bob & Bob are a Los Angeles-based performance art duo formed in 1974 by artists Francis Shishim (born 1953), known as The Dark Bob, and Paul Velick (born 1953), known as The Light Bob. They utilized various forms of multimedia for their projects, which include paintings, drawings, sculptures, dioramas, videos, improvised happenings, recordings, and installations that employ ironic humor to critique contemporary culture, the art world, high society, consumerism, and politics.

== Meeting and collaboration ==
Shishim and Velick first met in 1974 at the ArtCenter, where they were both students in Llyn Foulkes's painting class. However, instead of painting, they began to orchestrate performances related to the class. In one instance, they staged a citizen's arrest, handcuffing Foulkes and removing him from the classroom, only to return and dismiss the class. They then dropped the charges and released Foulkes, giving him the day off. They chose to call themselves Bob & Bob because it sounded like the most generic and banal everyman name, fitting their concept to focus on the experience and the audience, rather than on themselves as individual artists. On one occasion, they organized a class field trip to the Museum of Contemporary Art, Los Angeles, claiming they would meet and interview famous artists. There, they would approach unsuspecting museum-goers as though they were the notable artists they had identified to the class. They would then ask generic questions to the participant relevant to the artist they were unknowingly representing. Answering earnestly, the museum-goer was none the wiser concerning their participation in the performance ruse.

== Artistic practice ==
President and Board of Directors - Bank of California, 1978, 20”x20”, Ink and dry marker on Reeves paper

After graduating from Art Center, Bob & Bob established their art practice as a business in a Beverly Hills office space, where they wore suits to work. They created drawings of bankers, copied from photos found in the annual reports of banks and large corporations. They explain that "These poor bankers have spent their whole lives in classrooms and offices, and all they have to show for it is money and wrinkles. We wanted to turn them into art." The duo also documented their street happenings/performances in this affluent area, exposing the contradictions and seductive allure of Beverly Hills. These performances included activities such as barging into spaces marked "Private" or "Do Not Enter", sunbathing on Rodeo Drive, and being kicked out of La Scala for not being able to pay. About this approach, they said, “We went down the wrong lanes, we entered everywhere that said do not enter… that is where our art was, that is where Bob & Bob could help the world the most.”

Bob & Bob cultivated the persona of two “idiots, innocent, just in from the Midwest,” and used self-conscious publicity and satirical marketing techniques to promote their performances and exhibitions. Their promotional approach included references to popular culture, such as calling themselves the "Fab Two" in a parody of The Beatles. The duo also presented themselves as the integral part of their artwork, framing themselves conceptually as the art object, stating, “Here we are with our product and our product is Bob and Bob. Bob and Bob is to us what the soup can was to Andy Warhol. They’re our iconography”. Bob & Bob had become the packaging, and the packaging was the product.

As the brand, Bob & Bob implemented slogans to highlight their mission to make conceptual art fun, accessible, and meaningful to everyday people. Referring to their belief that everything they did as artists was valuable, they’d call their ideas "Money In The Bank". Or, when explaining what they did, they’d say "Making Art That Makes Sense" as a playful, ironic way to challenge the over-intellectualization of art.

=== Notable works ===
Bob & Bob, Sex is Stupid (1979) at the Los Angeles Institute of Contemporary Art (LAICA)

Bob & Bob became the art on the wall at the Los Angeles Institute of Contemporary Art (LAICA) in their seminal work, Sex is Stupid (1979), suspended inside a frame wearing their trademark suits and masks of their own faces. They hung for five hours, intermittently engaging each other in absurdities, accompanied by dance music; free drinks were served to attendees. Lining the gallery walls were twenty-five of their original artworks, each bearing an image of their faces and featuring a different style of painting. They were sold at the bargain price of $25 each. The performance duo's gallery show was an experimental event that critiqued the very art system it engaged with. They developed a distinctive motif, orchestrated a highly attended event, and ultimately sold out the show.

Forget Everything You Know (1980), a 12-hour-long Bob & Bob New Year's Eve happening hosted by LAICA, which had secured an empty warehouse in downtown LA. filling it with a dump truck full of popcorn. The aroma of the knee-deep popcorn filled the space, and the walls were lined with a hundred feet of blank canvas. Gallons of paint and hundreds of brushes were supplied to the large crowd, who spent the entire night getting drunk and painting to a futuristic live band of five synthesizers and a drummer. Bob & Bob sat precariously on a small platform built into the rafters and were painted gold and silver. Their voices, amplified, chanted to the crowd to forget everything they knew about everything and anything. After 12 hours, the walls, the popcorn, and the out-of-control crowd were covered in paint; everything had become a work of art.

Russia Needs Help, 1980, silkscreen print.

In 1980, when Russia invaded Afghanistan, American opinions were deeply divided. The news media reported the Russians as the protagonists of the war. Some citizens even advocated that the country enter the war against Russia. Bob & Bob wanted to challenge the prevailing belief that Russia was an enemy and needed to be violently stopped. They sought to propose a more compassionate view and end hatred toward the Russian people. Perhaps Russia was in trouble, and Bob & Bob could help. They created a 60-minute audio presentation and event titled Russian Needs Help at The Farm in San Francisco. Their work offered another perspective that they felt was more appropriate. Wearing their signature suits, the duo stood on a narrow platform above the audience's heads. Their hats made them resemble Russian dolls. Silkscreen posters of Bob & Bob as protest dolls, with the words "Russian Needs Help" printed across them, were hung just out of the audience's reach. As the audience tried to get the posters for themselves, they began jumping up, boosting one another, and even stacking chairs to grab them. Throughout the chaos, Bob & Bob maintained their precarious stance above the crowd. The performance became a space for collective yearning, vulnerability, and tension, reflecting the divisions and hopes at the heart of their message.

== Post-collaboration ==
After more than a decade of public performances, staged happenings, and object creation, Bob & Bob embarked on separate artistic journeys in 1984, not due to ideological differences but rather a geographic separation. Following the recording of an album with PolyGram/Polydor Records in New York City, the Light Bob chose to remain there, and the Dark Bob returned to the West Coast. Currently, they continue their individual art practices as the Dark Bob and the Paul Bob (formerly known as the Light Bob) and occasionally collaborate as Bob & Bob on projects.

Stop It, Digital print on paper, 33×44, 2025.

In March of 2026, Bob & Bob re-emerged for an exhibit titled Bob & Bob: 50 Years of Art | lost and found, featuring their collaborative works on paper (1975-2025). It included drawings, mixed-media collages, and photomontage images, which were presented at Craig Krull Gallery at Bergamot Station in Santa Monica. The vast amount of work presented in the show was based on scenarios that either happened or were imagined. like when Bob & Bob had a studio in Paris, France (1979-1981), but got on the wrong train and landed in Madrid (1981-2004), or when they went to heaven and gained new perspectives and insights to aid humanity (2025). The gallery show also offered a media room of historical documentation of earlier performances and related ephemera.

== Selected performances ==
- 1983 INTERNATIONAL PERFORMANCE FESTIVAL, Rotterbobs, (representing the United States was Bob & Bob, Chris Burden, Johanna Went, and James Lee Byers), Rotterdam, HOLLAND.
- 1981 WPA (Washington Project for the Arts), Across America, Washington, D.C.TORTUE GALLERY, Across America, Los Angeles, CA
- 1980 L.A.C.E. GALLERY, Here’s the News, Los Angeles, CAWEST HUBBARD GALLERY, Nature’s Perfect, Animals are Perfect, What are Humans?, Chicago, IL, ON THE BOARDS, Discotak, Seattle, WA, LA MAMELLE, INC., Russia Needs Help, San Francisco, CA
- 1979 THE KITCHEN, The Fab Two, New York, NY LOS ANGELES INSTITUTE OF CONTEMPORARY ART, Forget Everything You Know 1978 LOS ANGELES INSTITUTE OF CONTEMPORARY ART, Sex Is Stupid
- 1977 RUTH S. SCHAFFNER GALLERY, Brace Yourself For Action, Los Angeles, CA 1976 LOS ANGELES INSTITUTE OF CONTEMPORARY ART, The Fab Two
- 1975 LOS ANGELES INSTITUTE OF CONTEMPORARY ART, F.B.I. Bobs
- 1978-75 – Various unannounced performances in the streets. Notably: Club d’ Arte (1975), Rodeo Beach (1976), Oh Great, Now What? (1976), Deals (1976 through’78), It’s All Over (1977), We Must Be In The Wrong Place (1977), Just In From The Midwest (1977).

== Discography ==
- WE KNOW YOU’RE ALONE b/w WE’VE BEEN SEEING THINGS, 12 in.EP and cassette. Produced by PolyGram/Polydor Records, New York, NY. 1983
- ACROSS AMERICA, 12 in. LP, M.I.T.B. Records, 1981
- BOB & BOB – THEIR GREATEST HITS, 12 in. LP, M.I.T.B. Records, 1976
- SIMPLE AND EFFECTIVE, 12 in. LP, M.I.T.B. Records, 1978
- WE’RE ALL LUCKY, Cassette. Produced by Steve Rathe for The Museum of Contemporary Art, Los Angele, curated by Julie Lazar. Limited Edition MOCA Cassette, 1984
