= John Brill (photographer) =

American photographer

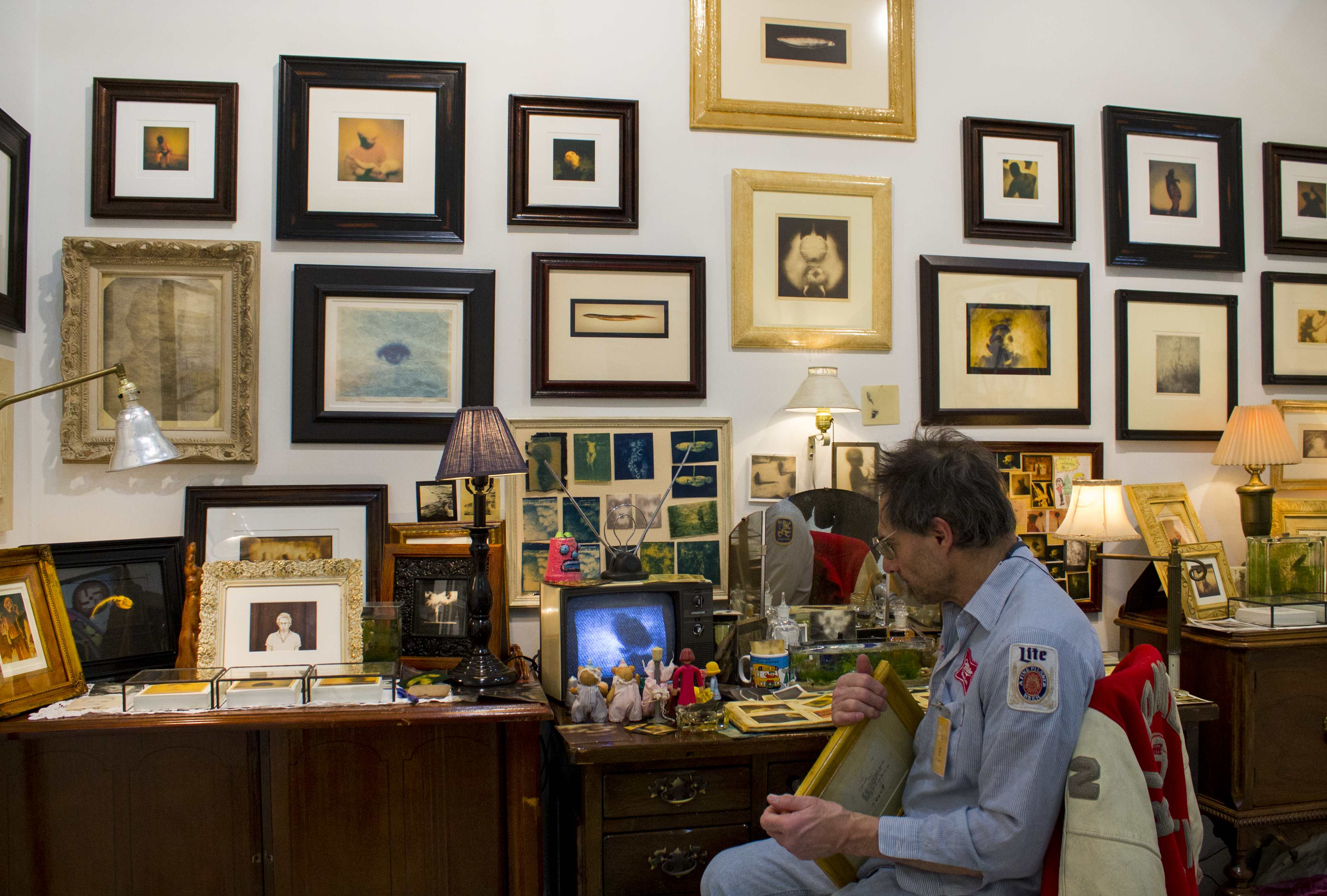
- John Brill in his installation of "Every Boy's Dream" at the Outsider Art Fair in New York (2015)
- Born: 1951 (age 74–75); Newark, New Jersey
- Occupation: Photographer
- Known for: Photography

John Brill (born 1951 in Newark, New Jersey) is an American photographer, known for his conceptual and subversive approach to the techniques and language inherent in the photographic process. John Brill is represented by Kent Fine Art in New York.

== Life ==
John Brill has been creating photographic records of his everyday existence since 1959. Self-taught in photography, his shift to art in 1981 followed his formal studies within the field of physiological psychology. From the mid-1970s through the 1980s, the artist drove a beer truck in the northeast corner of New Jersey, absorbing the raw visual beauty of a vast industrial wasteland, where he began shooting his seminal series of portraits and self-portraits. He is a self-taught photographer, who has exhibited regularly since the 1980s when Bill Arning of White Columns discovered his work and subsequently gave him his first solo show. Brill has been a school bus driver in Madison, New Jersey for over 20 years and is represented by Kent Fine Art in New York.

== Work ==
John Brill has created several thematically coherent, discrete bodies of work, which include; Family Holiday Album, engrams, ennui, Reliquary, and Cosmophelia. Although his œuvre is composed of versatile and separate bodies of work, all of his images have been created with specific regard for their dual role as two-dimensional representations as well as physical art objects.

Leah Ollman reflects on the artist's early work in the introduction to the 2002 monograph, The Photography of John Brill:

Beginning with staged portraits and self-portraits, his imagery became increasingly nebulous, reflecting his interest "in how resonance could remain unaffected by the systematic removal of content." Toward the end of the 1980s, he began seriously toying with the idea of the "thoughtograph." He scavenged for pictures, made some from life and others from the television screen, then worked to distance the images from their origins through multiple printings, fragmentation, tonal shifts and value reversals. In the end, the pictures derive more from mind than from matter. They're projections of his will, contrived out of pure desire. Physical representations of the incorporeal."

He is present in every step of the creative process, from taking the picture, printing, cutting the glass, and framing the images. Although each of the images he produces necessarily begins its genesis with pure camera vision, all of them undergo an extensive process of post-exposure construction, transcending the seminal act of exposure and inevitably culminating in a polar extreme on the continuum of image transformation. As stated in the text that accompanied his exhibition, Cosmophilia (2003), "The image that is ultimately perceived in the final print is not merely an interpretation of the original camera vision, but is an image—as well as physical object—that exists entirely on its own terms." His love of the process is apparent in his work as he shamelessly pursues new methods of printing and takes risks in creating his work. Some images he prints repeatedly, others he covers in wax, and still others he forms in a process of development that nearly overexposes his subject.

== Exhibitions ==
=== Solo ===
- 2006: Bad Memory, Kent Gallery, New York
- 2003: Cosmophilia, Kent Gallery, New York
- 2000: Reliquary, Kent Gallery, New York; Reliquary, Solomon Projects, Atlanta
- 1997: ennui, Kent Gallery, New York
- 1995: engrams, Kent Gallery, New York
- 1990: Family Holiday Album, Coup de Grace Gallery, New York 1988 Selected photographs, 1981–1987, The Sherman H. Masten Gallery, County College of Morris, Randolph, NJ
- 1986: Selected Self-Portraits, 1981–1984, White Columns, New York
- 1982: Twelve Self-Portraits, International Center of Photography, Education Gallery, New York

=== Group exhibitions ===
- 2012: The Limits of Photography, Museum of Contemporary Photography, Columbia College Chicago, Chicago
- 2010: About Face, Edward Thorp Gallery, New York
- 2007: Close Looking, Kent Gallery, New York
- 2006: Urban Cosmologies, Kent Gallery, New York
- 2005: The Constructed Image, Kent Gallery, New York
- 2003: New Jersey State Council on the Arts Fellowship Exhibition, Rutgers University, Camden, NJ
- 2002: Endless Summer, Kent Gallery, New York
- 2001: Vox, Kent Gallery, New York
- 2000: The UFO Show, University Gallery, Illinois State University, Normal, IL (catalogue)
- 1999: Dream Architecture, Kent Gallery, New York; Faces & Places, City Gallery East, Atlanta, GA; The Xmas Project, Kent Gallery, New York
- 1998 : The Waking Dream: Psychological Realism in Contemporary Art, Castle Gallery, The College of New Rochelle, New Rochelle, NY
- 1997: Portraits: 19th and 20th Century Photography, Marlborough Gallery, New York
- 1996: Black and White Unfixed, Nancy Solomon Gallery, Atlanta, GA; Difference, Kent Gallery, New York; New Jersey State Council on the Arts Fellowship Exhibition, The Noyes Museum, Oceanville, NJ (catalogue); White Columns 1996 Benefit Exhibition, White Columns, New York; Light into Darkness, Kent Gallery, New York
- 1995: Fact, Fiction and Truth: Contemporary Portraits, Lehman College Art Gallery, Bronx, NY (catalogue); the camera i: Photographic Self-portraits from the Audry and Sydney Irmas Collection, Los Angeles County Museum of Art (catalogue); (untitled group show), Tom Cugliani Gallery, New York
- 1993: Contacts/Proofs, The Jersey City Museum, Jersey City, NJ
- 1991: Fact or Fantasy, Coup de Grace Gallery, New York
- 1990: New Life, Coup de Grace Gallery, New York; Brut 90, White Columns, New York; Twentieth Anniversary Benefit Exhibition, White Columns, New York; Heads, Coup de Grace Gallery, New York; New Jersey State Council on the Arts Fellowship Exhibition, New Jersey Center for the Visual Arts, Summit, NJ (catalogue)
- 1989: Selected Photographs: Recent Acquisitions, The Brooklyn Museum
- 1988: Everything You Always Wanted to Know About Life, Coup de Grace Gallery, Hoboken, NJ
- 1986–87 Update, White Columns, New York (catalogue) New Jersey State Council on the Arts Fellowship Exhibition, The Morris Museum, Morristown, NJ
- 1985: Image Making, Pavilion Gallery, Mount Holly, NJ (catalogue)
- 1984: (untitled group show), Oggi-Domani, New York
- 1982: The World Within, The World Without, The Simon Gallery, Montclair, NJ
