= Rudolf Baranik =

American painter

Rudolf Baranik (September 10, 1920 – March 6, 1998) was an artist, educator, and writer.

Born in Lithuania, he immigrated to the United States in 1938, when his family sent him to live with a relative in Chicago. His parents were secular Jewish socialists and were killed by the Nazis during the Second World War. Baranik was well known in the art world for his political advocacy, and was one of the first artists to organize protests against the war in Vietnam. Some of his best known works are the Napalm Elegies, a series of 30 antiwar paintings created between 1967 and 1974. His art was inspired by his sense of the gross inequities around the world, and he led virtually every progressive political movement within the New York art world from the 1960s to the mid-1990s. Significant exhibitions and awards include:1981 Guggenheim Fellowship in Fine Arts, 1982 "Art Couples 1: May Stevens and Rudolf Baranik," P.S. 1, New York, NY, and 1966 Peace Tower. Baranik's art is included in many collections, including the Museum of Modern Art in New York, the Whitney Museum of American Art and the Hirshhorn Museum.

Baranik died in Eldorado, New Mexico in 1998.

The paintings of Rudolf Baranik are increasingly thought to be among the most important works of the New York School painting of the 1960s and 1970s, with the late paintings in particular considered by American art critic, Donald Kuspit, "the true climax of fifty years of Western abstract painting."
