= Susan Griffin =

American writer (1943–2025)

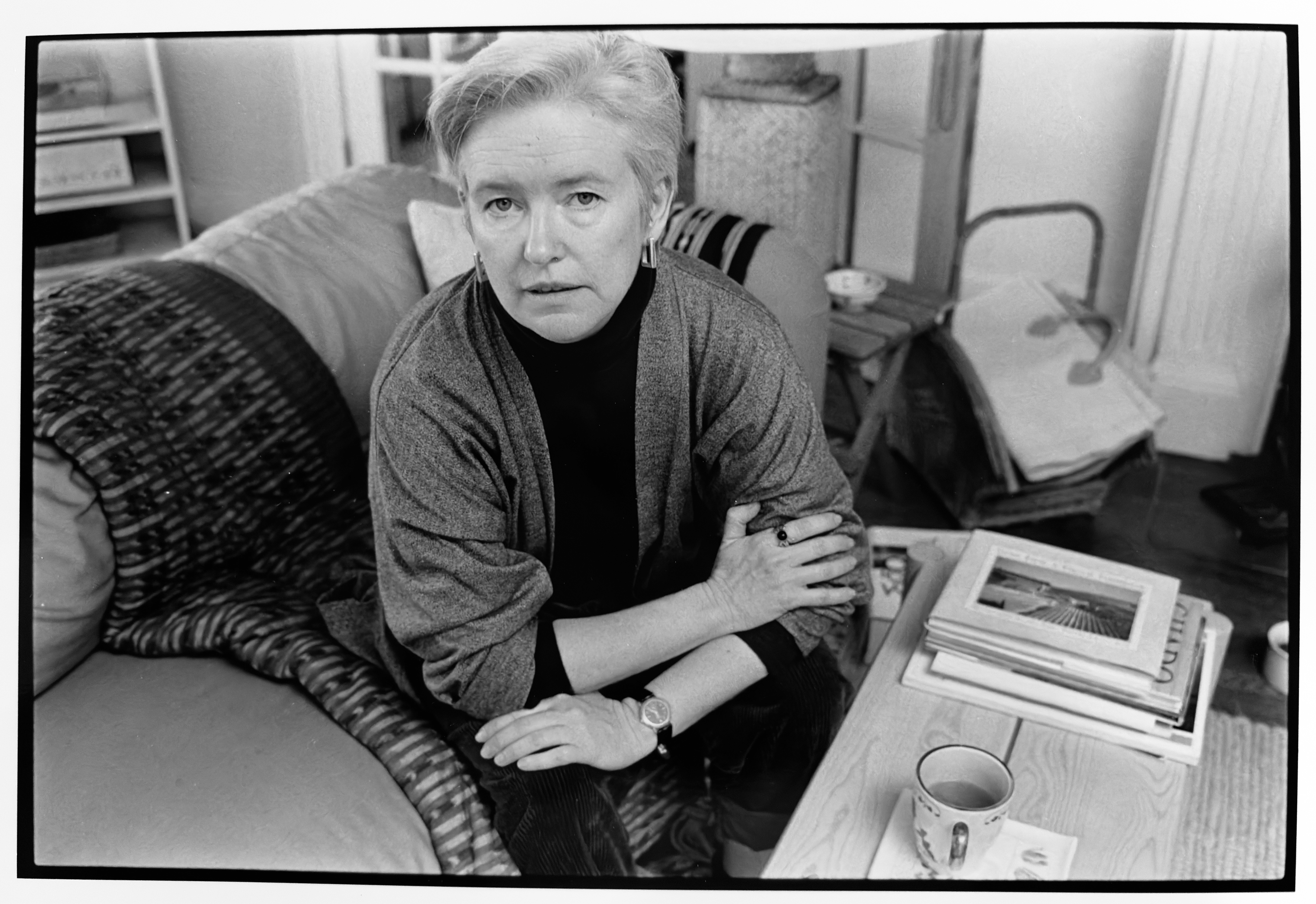
- Photo by Mark Sarfati, taken in 1985, for the East Bay Express, Berkeley, CA
- Born: January 26, 1943; Los Angeles, California, U.S.
- Died: September 30, 2025 (aged 82); Berkeley, California, U.S.
- Education: University of California, Berkeley
- Occupations: Philosopher; essayist; playwright; poet
- Notable work: Woman and Nature (1978)
- Children: 1
- Relatives: Morton Dimondstein (adoptive father)

Susan Griffin (January 26, 1943 – September 30, 2025) was an American radical feminist philosopher, essayist and playwright, particularly known for her innovative, hybrid-form ecofeminist works.

== Background ==
Griffin was born in Los Angeles, California on January 26, 1943. Following her father's death when she was 16, she bounced around the family but was eventually taken into the home and family of noted artist Morton Dimondstein. Her biological family were of Irish, Scottish, Welsh and German ancestry. Having spent a year in a post-War Jewish home, her German heritage wasn't openly spoken of and she initially demonized Germans, but later made several trips to Germany (including to the Mittelbau-Dora concentration camp) to reconcile her Jewish and German heritages. She attended the University of California, Berkeley, for two years, then transferred to San Francisco State College, where she received her Bachelor of Arts degree in Creative Writing (1965) and her Master of Arts degree (1973), both degrees under the tutelage of Kay Boyle. She taught as an adjunct professor at UC Berkeley as well as at Stanford University and California Institute of Integral Studies. Griffin also taught at the California Institute for Integral Studies, Pacifica Graduate Institute, the Wright Institute, and the University of California.

Griffin died from Parkinson's disease in Berkeley, California, on September 30, 2025, at the age of 82. Griffin's papers are located at the Schlesinger Library, Radcliffe Institute, at Harvard University.

== Work ==
Griffin wrote 21 books, including works of nonfiction, poetry, anthologies, plays, and a screenplay. Her work has been translated into over 12 languages. Griffin described her work as "draw[ing] connections between the destruction of nature, the diminishment of women and racism, and trac[ing] the causes of war to denial in both private and public life."

"Rape: The All-American Crime" (1971), an article published in Ramparts, was one of the first publications about rape from a feminist perspective.

Woman and Nature: The Roaring Inside Her (1978) has sold more than 100,000 copies, and draws connections between ecological destruction, sexism, and racism. Considered a form of prose-poetry, this work is believed to have launched ecofeminism in the United States. Griffin attributed her connection to ecofeminism to her upbringing along the Pacific Coast, which she believed cultivated her awareness of ecology.

Griffin articulated her anti-pornography feminism in Pornography and Silence: Culture's Revenge Against Nature (1981). In this work she makes the case that although the pursuit of freedom of speech could lead to a position against the censorship of pornography, the freedom to create pornography leads to a compromise of "human liberation" (since liberation of humankind would include the emancipation of women). She argues that pornography and eros are separate and opposing ideas, with pornography "express[ing] not a yearning for sexual liberation but its opposite, a desire to silence eros." According to Griffin, pornography's origins are rooted in a widespread fear of nature, and pornographic imagery "objectifies and degrades the (usually female) body". This, according to Griffin, teaches women to self-deprecate, and fuels an unhealthy, perverted culture. In contrast, Griffin argues that "real sexual liberation requires a reconciliation with nature, a healing between body and spirit". Critics largely responded to Pornography and Silence with contempt, many complaining that it came off as more of a rant than realistic philosophical discussion.

== Awards ==
Griffin received a MacArthur grant for Peace and International Cooperation, NEA and Guggenheim Foundation fellowships, and a local Emmy Award for the play Voices. She is featured in the 2014 feminist history film She's Beautiful When She's Angry. She was a finalist for the Pulitzer Prize for General Nonfiction in 1993 for A Chorus of Stones: The Private Life of War.

== Criticism ==
Many critics praise Griffin's blunt takes and insights to the role of feminism in every major issue today, while others have criticized her writings for being too convoluted or ranting. Largely, reviews for Griffin's work take opposing views on the intertwining and complicated connections she suggests between the woman and larger worldly issues such as war, disease, pornography, and nature itself. These webs are mirrored in her unique writing style which critics have reflected upon extensively.

In a 1994 review by Carol H. Cantrell, Griffin's Woman and Nature is characterised as "hard to describe. Most of it looks like prose on the page but the thought is fragmented, metaphorical, and discontinuous; there are plenty of stories, but they too are often elliptical and metaphorical." In a review of What Her Body Thought: A Journey into the Shadows, Susan Dion of The Women's Review of Books wrote: "...Griffin is not merely reiterating old themes in feminist scholarship or the history of medicine; rather, she probes, ponders, and suggests different ways of considering many interrelated issues...Griffin's musings and hypotheses are fresh, smart, and instructive, if not always convincing."

== Published works ==
- Woman and Nature: the Roaring Inside Her (1978) Ecofeminist treatise (1st Edition, has since been reprinted)
- Rape: The Politics of Consciousness (1979) OCLC 781089176 ISBN 0062503502
- Pornography and Silence: Culture's Revenge Against Nature (1981) OCLC 964062418 ISBN 0704338777
- "Sadomasochism and the erosion of self: a critical reading of Story of O," in Against Sadomasochism: A Radical Feminist Analysis, ed. Robin Ruth Linden (East Palo Alto, Calif. : Frog in the Well, 1982.), pp. 183–201
- Unremembered Country: poems (Copper Canyon Press, 1987) OCLC 16905255 ISBN 1556590008
- A Chorus of Stones: the Private Life of War (1993) Psychological aspects of violence, war, womanhood OCLC 1005479046 ISBN 038541885X
- The Eros of Everyday Life: Essays on Ecology, Gender and Society (1995) OCLC 924501690 ISBN 0385473907
- Bending Home: Selected New Poems, 1967-1998 (Copper Canyon Press, 1998) OCLC 245705378 ISBN 1556590865
- What Her Body Thought: a Journey into the Shadows (1999)
- The Book of the Courtesans: a Catalogue of Their Virtues (2001)
- Wrestling with the Angel of Democracy: On Being an American Citizen (2008)
- Transforming Terror: Remembering the Soul of the World, co-edited with Karen Lofthus Carrington (University of California Press, 2011)
