= Paul Laffoley =

American architect (1935–2015)

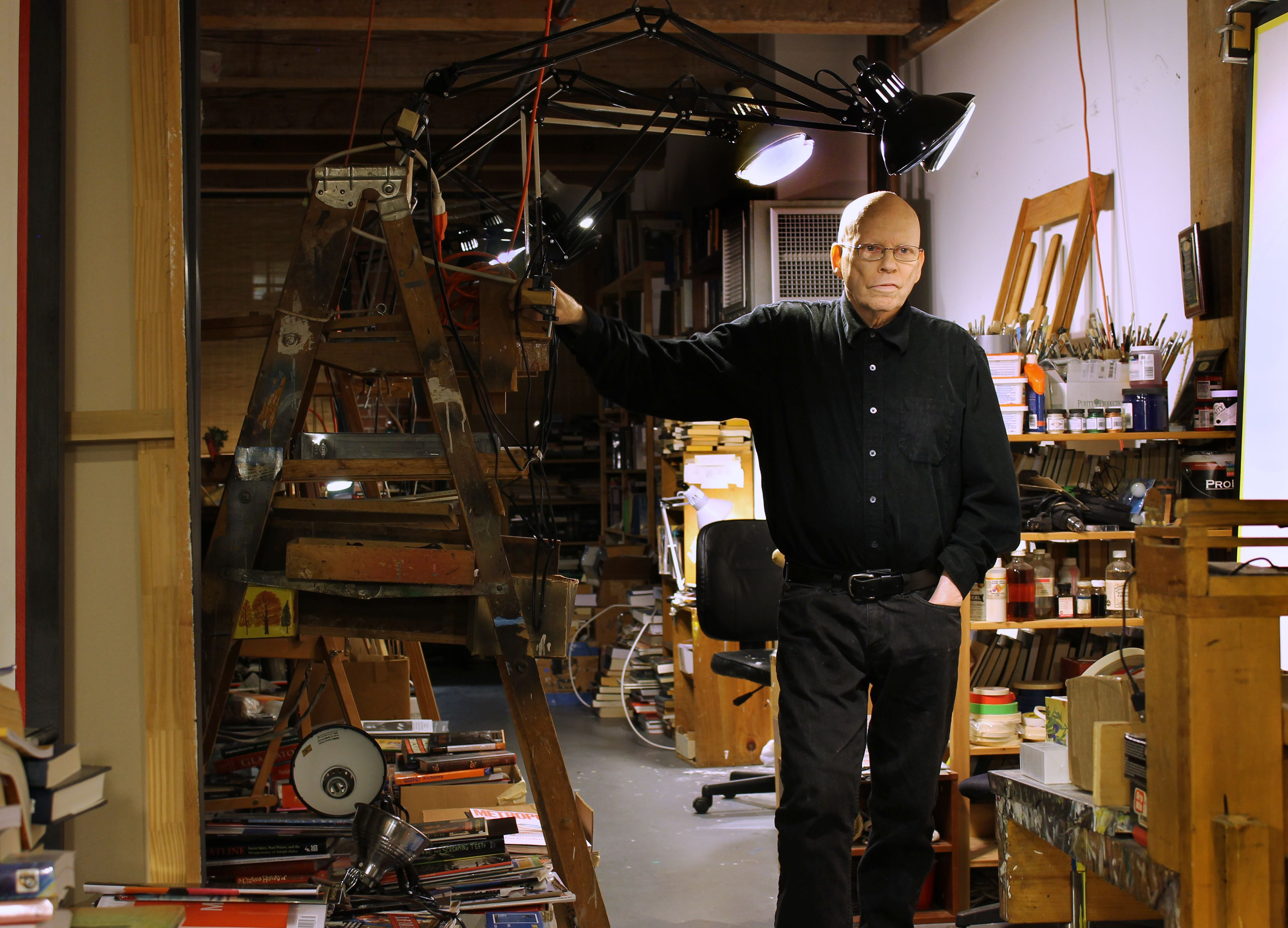
- Laffoley in January 2015
- Born: August 14, 1935; Cambridge, Massachusetts, U.S.
- Died: November 16, 2015 (aged 80); Boston, Massachusetts, U.S.
- Education: Brown University
- Movement: Visionary Art
- Website: https://paullaffoley.net

Paul Laffoley (August 14, 1935 – November 16, 2015) was an American visionary artist and architect based in Boston, Massachusetts.

== Early life ==
Laffoley was born in Cambridge, Massachusetts, to an Irish Catholic family on August 14, 1935.

Laffoley wrote that his first spoken word was "Constantinople" at the age of six months, and that he did not speak again until he was four years old. As a child, he was diagnosed with Asperger's syndrome. He attended the Mary Lee Burbank School in Belmont, which utilized Waldorf education. As a draftsman, he was ridiculed by his abstract expressionist teachers. After studies at the Mary Lee Burbank, Laffoley completed undergraduate studies at Brown University and graduated in 1961 with honors in classics, philosophy, and art history. According to his "Phenomenology of Revelation," while at Brown in 1961, Laffoley was given eight electroshock treatments after "about a year of weekly sessions with a psychiatrist, who had treated [him] for a mild state of catatonia."

== Career ==
Following his studies in architecture at Brown University and Harvard, he went to New York in 1963, to work with the artist and architect Frederick Kiesler, and was also hired to watch late-night TV for Andy Warhol in exchange for housing.

Laffoley painted in the basement of his family home in Belmont on the weekends, where he completed his first fully mature vision: "The Kali-Yuga: The End of the Universe at 424826 A.D". From this point forward, Laffoley began to formulate his trans-disciplinary approach, combining philosophy, science, architecture and spirituality into the practice of painting. Laffoley first started to work in a format related to Eastern mandalas, partially inspired by the patterns he watched for Warhol on late-night television. This quickly developed into five general subcategories of paintings: operating systems, psychotronic devices, meta-energy, time travel, and lucid dreaming. Conceived as "structured singularities", Laffoley did not work in series but approached each project as a unique schematic. Each 73 ½ x 73 ½ inch canvas would take up to three years to paint and code. By the late 1980s, Laffoley began to shift from the spiritual and the intellectual to viewing his work as an interactive, physically engaging psychotronic device.

In 2001, Laffoley was seriously injured in a fall in his studio. Complications from diabetes led to the amputation of his right leg below the knee. At Laffoley's request, Stan Winston made him a custom prosthetic leg that resembled a lion's paw, symbolizing Laffoley's astrological sign, Leo.

Following the destruction of the World Trade Center towers in the September 11 attacks, Laffoley was among several architects who submitted designs in 2002 for the competition to plan the Freedom Tower. Laffoley's design was inspired by the work of Catalan architect Antoni Gaudí and was conceived as a hotel in the style of Gaudí's Sagrada Família church in Barcelona.

After the Austin Museum of Art organized a traveling survey of his career in 1999, Laffoley gained a following among curators. The Palais de Tokyo in Paris had an entire room with his work in its 2009 exhibition "Chasing Napoleon", and several of his works were included in "The Alternative Guide to the Universe" at the Hayward Gallery in London in 2013. Other major shows include "Premonitions of the Bauharoque" at the Henry Art Gallery, Seattle, "Secret Garden" at the Hamburger Bahnhof, Berlin, and the monograph The Essential Paul Laffoley edited by Douglas Walla and published by the University of Chicago Press in Spring 2016.

== Works ==
Laffoley's paintings combine words and imagery, typically on large canvases, to depict a spiritual architecture of explanation. They address concepts like dimensionality, time travel (through "hacking" relativity), connections between conceptual threads shared by philosophers, and theories about the cosmic origins of mankind.

Laffoley's writings and works of art were published in May 2016 by the University of Chicago Press in a book entitled The Essential Paul Laffoley. The book was edited by Douglas Walla, with additional texts by Linda Dalywimple Henderson, Arielle Saiber and Steven Moskowitz.

In his collection of essays entitled When Surface was Depth, British writer Michael Bracewell observed: "If Laffoley's work within the Boston Visionary Cell can be said to have one principal preoccupation - a common denominator of his eclectic scholarship and practice - then that preoccupation would be to understand the process by which one goes from becoming to being". Bracewell has also written that "The Boston Visionary Cell, as a concretized manifestation of its inhabitant's work and preoccupations, describes how a chaos of data - no less than a chaos of marble - can be sculpted by research to release the perfect forms within it".

The Estate of Paul Laffoley is represented by Kent Fine Art in New York.

== Death ==
Laffoley died on November 16, 2015, in South Boston, Massachusetts, of congestive heart failure.

== Exhibitions ==
- The Force Structure of the Mystical Experience. New York: Kent Fine Art, 2015.
- Chasing Napoleon. Paris: Palais de Tokyo, 2009.
- Architectonic Thought-Forms: Gedankenexperiment in Zombie Aesthetics. A Survey of the Visionary Art of Paul Laffoley. Texas: Austin Museum of Art, 1999.
- Paul Laffoley: Secret Universe. Berlin: Hamburger Bahnhof, 2012.
- The Alternative Guide to the Universe. London: Hayward Gallery, 2013.
- Paul Laffoley: The Boston Visionary Cell. New York: Kent Fine Art, 2013.
- Paul Laffoley: Premonitions of the Bauharoque. Seattle: Henry Art Gallery, 2013.

=== Major works ===
- The Kali-Yuga: the End of the Universe at 424826 A.D. (1965)
- The Cosmos Falls into the Chaos as Shakti Urborosi: The Elimination of Value Systems by Spectrum Analysis (1965)
- The Ecstasy of Revulsion (1966)
- The World Self (1967)
- I, Robur, Master of the World (1968)
- The Visionary Art Process (1969)
- The Final Descent From Hyparxis (1970)
- The Promethean Sinner (1970)
- The Visionary Point (1970)
- Utopia: Time Cast As A Voyage (1974)
- Alchemy: The Telenomic Process of the Universe (1974)
- Temporality: The Great Within of the Universe (1974)
- The Visionary Artist’s Studio (1974)
- Get Thee Behind Me, Satan (1974–1983)
- The Third Living Creature (1975)
- The Kyklos of Hermocrates (1975)
- Black-White Hole: the Force of the History of the Universe to Produce Total Non-Existence (1976)
- The Secret of Life Lies in Death (1976)
- The Living Klein Bottle House of Time (1976)
- The Comet Kohoutek (1976)
- The Renovation Mundi (1977)
- A Proposal For A Pinball Museum (1978)
- Cosmolux (1981)
- The Orgone Motor (1982)
- Color Breathing (1983)
- Thanaton III (1989)
- Geochronmechane: The Time Machine from the Earth (1990)
- It Came From Beneath Space: Lucid Dream Number 52 (1991)
- The Solitron (1997)
- Dimensionality: The Manifestation of Fate (1999)
- After Gaudi: A Grand Hotel for New York City (2002)
- Pickman's Mephitic Models (2004)
- The Myth of the Zeit-Geist (2013)

=== Books and monographs ===
- Laffoley, Paul, edited and texts by Douglas Walla, with essays by Linda Dalrymple Henderson, Arielle Saiber and Steve Moskowitz. "The Essential Paul Laffoley" Chicago: The University of Chicago Press. 2016
- Laffoley, Paul, and Jeanne M. Wasilik. "The Phenomenology of Revelation". New York: Kent Fine Art, 1989. ISBN 978-1878607058
- Laffoley, P. (1999). Architectonic Thought Forms: a Survey of the Art of Paul Laffoley 1967–1999. Austin, TX: Austin Museum of Fine Art.
- Paul Laffoley: Secret Universe. Walther König, Köln, 2012. ISBN 978-3863350888 (catalog)
- Croquer, Luis. (2013) "Paul Laffoley: Premonitions of the Bauharoque". Seattle: Henry Art Gallery. ISBN 978-0-935558-52-4
- Laffoley, Paul. (2016) "The Essential Paul Laffoley: Works from the Boston Visionary Cell." Chicago: University of Chicago Press. ISBN 9780226315416

=== Interviews ===
- The Viking Youth Power Hour interview Paul at the Esozone, August 11, 2007
- February 12, 2007. 3-hour interview on Mike Hagan's "RadiOrbit" show. Broad range of topics covered including Laffoley's early life, working on the World Trade Center in the 1970s, developing his time travel theories, the Raelians, Buckminster Fuller, nanotechnology, living architecture and 2012.
- 2001 Thanaton III produced for Channel 4.
- 1999 Pseudo.com Online Network interview with Richard Metzger of The Disinformation Company
- 1998 The Mystery of Genius (two part series) for the Arts & Entertainment Channel produced by Robert Fiveson. (broadcast in 1999). Interviewed by John Metherell.
- 1997 Paul Laffoley on the Time Machine, Strange Universe (original broadcast September 10, 1997). Interviewed by Alisyn Camerota.

=== Notable public collections ===
- Addison Gallery of American Art, Andover, MA
- Austin Museum of Art, Austin, TX
- Brockton Museum of Art, Brockton, MA
- Continental Can Corporation, NY
- First National Bank of Chicago, Chicago, IL
- Grand Rapids Art Museum, Grand Rapids, MI
- Hirshhorn Museum and Sculpture Garden, Washington D.C.
- Museum of Fine Arts, Boston, MA
- Ruth and Marvin Sackner Archive of Concrete and Visual Poetry, Miami, FL
- Pérez Art Museum Miami, FL
- Tufts New England Medical Center, Boston, MA
- American Visionary Art Museum, Baltimore, MD
- American Folk Art Museum, New York, NY
- DeCordova Sculpture Park and Museum, Lincoln, MA
- Henry Art Gallery, Seattle, WA
