= Peace Tower (art) =

Art installation protesting the Vietnam War

The Peace Tower (also known as The Artists' Tower of Protest) was a collaborative artwork spearheaded by the artists Irving Petlin and Mark di Suvero. The Peace Tower was created in the winter of 1966 in the West Hollywood neighborhood of Los Angeles to protest US involvement in the Vietnam War. Forty years later, Mark di Suvero, Irving Petlin, and Rirkrit Tiravanija collaborated in revisiting the project through a new installation entitled Peace Tower (2006) for the Whitney Museum of American Art in New York City to protest the Iraq War.

== Los Angeles, 1966 ==
The idea for the original Peace Tower was promoted by Irving Petlin along with the Los Angeles Artist's Protest Committee, an organization numbering over 100 supporters. Through meetings held at the Dwan Gallery through the generosity of John Weber, the artists wanted to make a visible statement against the United States involvement in Vietnam. They raised about $10,000, (according to another participant, Max Kozloff) a large sum was secretly given by Robert Rauschenberg. With the funds, they rented an empty lot on Sunset Strip in Hollywood, and erected the tower. There was a moment when the local building inspectors challenged the structural integrity of the tower at which point DiSuvero took a pulley and suspended a car from the Tower giving the structure city clearance.

The Tower consisted of a fifty-eight foot tall steel tetrahedron, which acted as scaffolding for works of art protesting the War. Over 418 works, each measuring 24 x 24 in. were displayed and subsequently donated to generate a legal fund by artists of the Artists' Protest Committee (APC) (by figures such as Robert Motherwell, Ad Reinhardt, Elaine de Kooning, Frank Stella, Roy Lichtenstein, James Rosenquist, and Leon Golub). Other artists and participants included: Elise Asher, Rudolf Baranik, Will Barnet, Nell Blaine, Paul Brach, James Brooks, Vija Celmins, Herman Cherry, Allan D'Arcangelo, Elaine de Kooning, Richard Diebenkorn, Philip Evergood, Leon Golub, Balcomb Greene, Philip Guston, Robert Gwathmey, Eva Hesse, John Hultberg, Donald Judd, Max Kozloff, Jack Levine, Roy Lichtenstein, Marcia Marcus, Robert Motherwell, Alice Neel, Louise Nevelson, Philip Pearlstein, Ad Reinhardt, James Rosenquist, Moses Soyer, Nancy Spero, Hedda Sterne, May Stevens, George Sugarman, Tom Wesselmann, Robert Wiegand, and Adja Yunkers. The fund was used to contest the Rand Corporation’s recommendation to the United States military to employ the use of “Agent Orange”.

On February 26, 1966, the day of a large protest at the tower, Petlin received telegrams of support from Jean Paul Sartre, Simone de Beauvoir and others intellectuals. Despite frequent acts of vandalism at the site, and violent physical attacks on the artists working there, the Peace Tower was dedicated at a ceremony on February 26, 1966 with remarks by Susan Sontag. The Peace Tower remained for three months, functioning as a galvanizing symbol of dissent. Petlin relates that at one point he had to defend himself with a broken lightbulb and that when Frank Stella heard about this he sent a check for $1000, writing, "Anybody who puts their life on the line defending a work of art of mine, I'm going to send a thousand bucks too." In the end, no painting was damaged.
