= Dennis Adams =

American artist (born 1948)

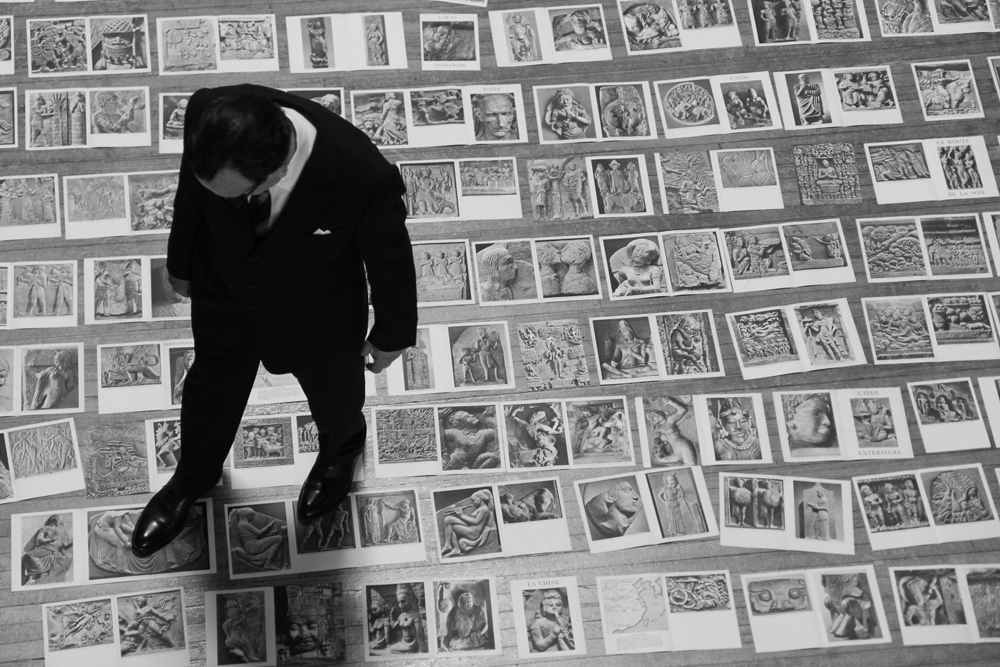
- Dennis Adams, Malraux's Shoes, 2012
- Born: Dennis Adams; 1948 (age 77–78); Iowa, United States
- Known for: Photography, public sculpture, installation, film
- Spouse: Elke Lehmann

...

== Personal life ==
Dennis Adams (born 1948) is an American artist. He has made urban interventions and museum installations that reveal historical and political undercurrents in photography, cinema, public space and architecture.

Dennis Adams is married to Elke Lehmann, a German artist, who does site-specific installation pieces and paintings. She was also a lecturer at Yale University.

...

== About ==
Adams was born in Des Moines, Iowa. Through his urban interventions and museum installations, Adams has focused on the conception of photography as a medium that has crucially transformed the representation of history as a primary means for the open reconstruction of imagery resonating within the realm of social context. His first decade of activity is best documented in the monograph entitled Dennis Adams: The Architecture of Amnesia (1989). Beginning in 1998, Adams began to explore the medium of video and social engagement with projects such as OUTTAKE (1999), Makedown (2004), Spill (2009) and most recently Malraux's Shoes (2012).

== Work ==
Adams is an artist that has produced inversions of street architecture, urban interventions, performance videos, and works of art that form a discourse with historical and sociopolitical undercurrents in photography, cinema, public space, and architecture. Since 1980, he has realized over fifty urban projects in cities worldwide from Antwerp to Zagreb. His work has been the subject of over seventy-five solo exhibitions in museums and galleries throughout North America and Europe including: The Museum of Modern Art, New York; MHKA, Antwerp; The Kitchen, New York; De Appel Foundation, Amsterdam; The Barcelona Pavilion, Fundacio Mies Van Der Rohe, Barcelona; Contemporary Art Museum, Houston; Portikus, Frankfurt; and The Queens Museum of Art, New York. Numerous works can be viewed in public collections in the United States, France, Spain, Germany and Belgium.

Adams has produced site-specific interventions, often in highly visible locations such as bus shelters, and urban public settings that focus on the phenomenon of collective amnesia in the late twentieth century. A survey of ten years of site-specific works was published in a monograph entitled Dennis Adams: The Architecture of Amnesia (1989) written by Maryanne Staniszewski. The publication was followed by two mid-career surveys organized by the Museum van Hedendaagse Kunst Antwerpen and the Contemporary Art Museum of Houston. Following the events of September 11 near his Tribeca studio, Adams created a poetic series of fourteen Ektachrome photographs portraying the detritus filled sky over lower Manhattan. The series was entitled AIRBORNE' which after being shown in New York in 2002 was subsequently featured in the Le Mois de la Photo (Montreal) 2003 and PhotoEspana (Madrid) 2004.

Beginning in 1998 and continuing today, Adams began to explore the possibilities of video with his OUTTAKE, exhibited in Bremen, Berlin and with Kent in New York. Adams presented a 17:23-second segment (416 film stills) from Bambule, a 1969 un-broadcast German documentary on delinquent girls directed by Ulrike Meinhof. These photographic stills were re-recorded as they were distributed in the Kurfurstendamm, Berlin, as "handbills," or "flyers," associated with political propaganda and advertising. Adams continued realizing a number of single channel videos including "Takedown", "Spill", "Curtain Call", "Black Belmondo" and prominently a performative installation entitled 'MAKE DOWN (2005). Here, Adams addresses the complexity of layers of representation contained in one except from The Battle of Algiers, particularly in the context of the ongoing transformations of the historical conflict between Islamic and Western cultures. Instead of presuming to unravel these meanings, Adams chooses instead to locate himself between the frames of the image in a re-enactment of the process of disguise.

Adams has been a faculty member or Visiting Professor at numerous institutions including the Parsons School of Design; École nationale supérieure des Beaux-Arts, Paris; Rijksakademie van Beeldende Kunsten, Amsterdam; and the Akademie der Bildenden Kunst, Munich. From 1997 to 2004, he was the Director of the Visual Arts Program in the School of Architecture at MIT in Cambridge, Massachusetts. He currently a professor at Cooper Union, New York.

== Artist books ==
- Adams, Dennis, and Mary A. Staniszewski. The Architecture of Amnesia. New York, N.Y: Kent Fine Art, 1990.
- Adams, Dennis. Dennis Adams: Double Feature. New York, N.Y: Kent Fine Art, 2008.
- Recovered 10 on 10 – Adams on Garanger, produced and published in 1993 by Les Maîtres de Forme Contemporains (mfc-michèle didier), Bruxelles. Limited edition of 6 numbered and signed copies and 3 artist's proofs. Voir mfc

== Exhibitions ==
- 1984 Solo Exhibit, the Kitchen, New York
- 1987 "Skulptur Projekte Münster", Westfälisches Landesmuseum, Münster, Germany
- 1987 "Building Against Image" (retrospective), The Alternative Museum, New York
- 1988 Solo Exhibit, De Appel Foundation, Amsterdam
- 1988 "Bezugspunkte 38/88", Steirischer Herbst, Graz, Austria
- 1989 "Magiciens de la terre", Musée National d'Art Moderne, Centre Georges Pompidou, and La Grande Halle, Parc de la Villette, Paris
- 1989 "Image World: Art and Media Culture", Whitney Museum of American Art, New York
- 1989 "Images Critiques: Adams, Jaar, Jammes, Wall", Musée d'Art Moderne de la Ville de Paris, Paris
- 1989 "Tenir l'image à distance", Musée D'art Contemporain, Montréal
- 1990 Architecture of Amnesia, Kent Fine Art, New York
- 1990 "WORKS: Dennis Adams", Hirshhorn Museum and Sculpture Garden, Washington, D.C.
- 1990 "Passages de l'image", Musée National d'Art Moderne, Centre Georges Pompidou, Paris
- 1990 "Rhetorical Image", The New Museum, New York
- 1990 "The Ready Made Boomerang", Sydney Biennale, Australia
- 1991 "Road to Victory", PROJECT Series, Museum of Modern Art, New York
- 1991 "The Solar Anus", Musée Frac Bretagne, Rennes, France.
- 1992 "Post Human", FAE Musée d'Art Contemporain, Pully/Lausanne, Switzerland; traveled to: Castello di Rivoli, Museo d'Arte Contemporanea, Torino; Deste Foundation for Contemporary Art, Athens; Deichtorhallen Hamburg
- 1993 "Der Müll, ( ) Unde Der Tod", Portikus, Frankfurt am Main
- 1994 "Selling History" (retrospective), Contemporary Arts Museum, Houston
- 1994 "Transactions" (retrospective), Museum van Hedendaagse Kunst Antwerpen
- 1995 "Light Constructions", Museum of Modern Art, New York
- 1995 "10 thru 20" (solo exhibition), Stroom HCBK, The Hague
- 1996 "Ederle", Queens Museum of Art, New York
- 1999 "Panorama 2000", Organized by Centraal Museum, Utrecht, The Netherlands
- 2000 Whitney Biennial, Whitney Museum of Art, New York
- 2001 "Hortus Conclusus", Witte de With, Rotterdam
- 2001 Solo Exhibit, Contemporary Museum Baltimore in collaboration with the Walters Art Museum, Baltimore
- 2002 "Video topiques/Tours et Retours de l'Art Vidéo", Musée d'Art Moderne et Contemporain de Strasbourg, France
- 2003 "Warum", Martin-Gropius-Bau, Berlin
- 2004 "Ambulates/Cultura Portátil: Actitudes y Prototipos en el Espacio público", Centro Andaluz de Arte Contemporáneo of Sevilla, Spain
- 2004 "Freeload", Mies van der Rohe Pavilion, Barcelona
- 2005 "Make Down", Kent Fine Art, New York City
- 2005 "Regarding Terror: The RAF- Exhibition", Kunst-Werke Institute for Contemporary Art, Berlin and Neue Galerie am Landesmuseum Joanneum, Graz
- 2007 "Filles rebelles". Frac Nord-Pas de Calais, Dunkerque, France
- 2008 "Blickmaschinen", Museum Für Gegenwartskunst, Siegen, Germany
- 2008 "Revolutions 1968", Zacheta National Gallery of Art, Warsaw
- 2008 Double Feature, Kent Fine Art, New York
- 2009 "Evento 2009: Collective Intimacy", Bordeaux, France
- 2009 "Walls of Algiers: Narratives of the Colonial City", The Getty Research Institute, Los Angeles
- 2010 "How Wine Became Modern", San Francisco Museum of Modern Art
- 2010 "La Memoria del Otro"; Museo Internacional de Chile, traveled to Centro de Arte Contempráneo Wifredo Lam, Havana
- 2011 "Uncanny Familiarity: Images of Terror", C/O Berlin
- 2012 "Malraux's Shoes", Kent Fine Art, New York
- 2015 "Looking Back / The 9the White Columns Annual", White Columns, New York

== Bibliography ==
=== By Adams ===
- "Questionnaire." Zone 1–2, 1986, pp. 423, 455.
- "Sky Writing." Historias: VII Edición del Festival Internacional de Fotografia y Artes Visuales PhotoEspaña. Catalogue. Madrid: 2004, pp. 63–66, 168–170.
- "Double Feature." New York: Kent Fine Art, 2008.

=== On Adams ===
==== Catalogs ====
- "The Architecture of Amnesia". New York: Kent Fine Art, 1990. Essay by Mary Anne Staniszewski.
- "Port of View" (catalog) Marseille: L'observatoire, 1992.
- "Dennis Adams". Pamplona: Galería Moisés Pérez de Albéniz, 2004.

==== Artist's book ====
- "Double Feature". New York: Kent Gallery. 2008.
