= Antoni Muntadas =

Spanish artist (born 1942)

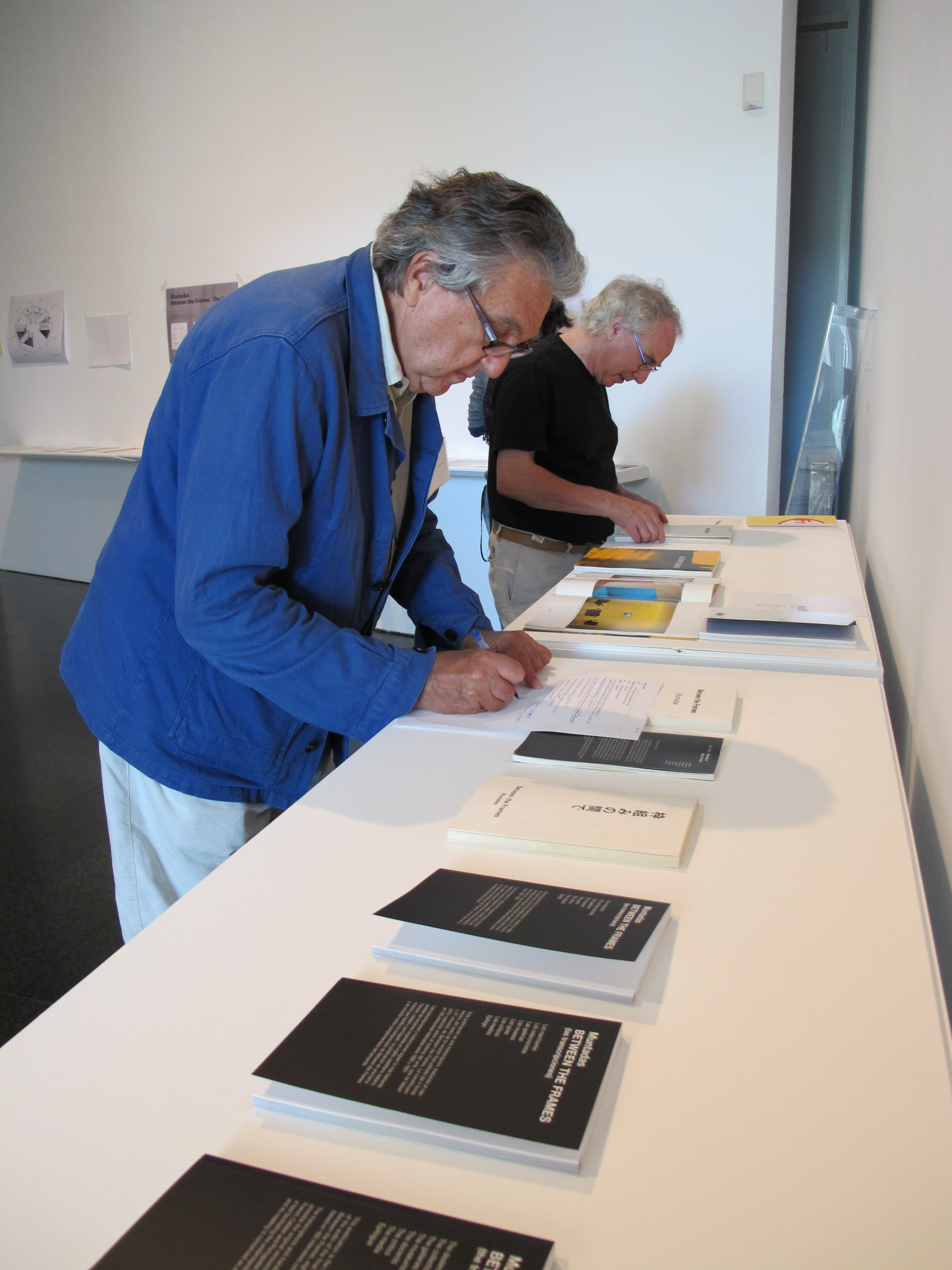

Antoni Muntadas (born 1942 in Barcelona) is a postconceptual multimedia artist, who has resided in New York since 1971. His work often addresses social, political and communications issues through different media: such as photography, video, text and image publications, the Internet, and multi-media installations.

== Artwork ==
His work has addressed mass media, public and private space, and the circulation of information. Following this line, he coined the terms media landscape – to allude the "ever-expanding presence" of mass media, advertising and audiovisual material in the public space – and "critical subjectivity" – to refer to the critical modes of perception, thought, and subject configuration.

His projects are presented in different mediums, such as photography, video, publications, the Internet, installations and urban interventions, and have been exhibited in numerous museums, including the Museum of Modern Art in New York, the Berkeley Art Museum in California, the Musée Contemporain de Montreal, the Museo Nacional Centro de Arte Reina Sofía in Madrid, the Museo de Arte Moderno in Buenos Aires, the Museu de Arte Moderna in Rio de Janeiro, the Musée Jeu de Paume in Paris and the Museu d’Art Contemporani de Barcelona, among others. In addition, his works have been presented in different international events: VI and X editions of Documenta Kassel (1977, 1997), the Whitney Biennal of American Art (1991), the 51st Venice Biennial (1976, 2005) and those in São Paulo, Lyon, Taipei, Gwangju, Istanbul and La Havana. Muntadas with the Catalan artist Antoni Miralda held a collective exhibition at the PalmaDotze gallery in Santa Margarida los Monjos (Penedès) to celebrate its 30th anniversary.

Within the academic field, Muntadas has taught and directed seminars at diverse institutions throughout Europe and the United States, including the National School of Fine Arts in Paris, the Fine Arts Schools in Bordeaux and Grenoble, the University of California, San Diego, the San Francisco Art Institute, the Cooper Union in New York, the Fine Arts Academy in Beijing (CAFA), the Art University in Tokyo, the University of São Paulo, and the University of Buenos Aires. He has also been invited as a resident artist and consulting advisor at various research and education centers including the Visual Studies Workshop in Rochester, the Banff Centre in Alberta, Arteleku in San Sebastian, The National Studio for Contemporary Arts Le Fresnoy, and the University of Western Sydney. He maintained a relationship with the MIT in Cambridge for longer than 35 years (1977–2014), which is of special importance. There, Muntadas first exercised as a research fellow, then as a lecturer and professor in practice. Currently, he is teaching at the Università Iuav di Venezia in Venice.

Muntadas has received several prizes and grants, including those of the John Simon Guggenheim Memorial Foundation, the Rockefeller Foundation, the National Endowment for the Arts, the New York State Council on the Arts, Arts Electronica in Linz, Laser d'Or in Locarno, the Premi Nacional d’Arts Plàstiques awarded by the Catalan Government and the 2005 National Award for Plastic Arts (Spain). One of his most recent awards is the Premio Velázquez de las Artes Plásticas 2009 granted by the Spanish Ministry of Culture. In 2016 he was invited to Geneva in the framework of the Arts at CERN programme.

== Projects ==
Most important Muntadas projects between 1971 and 2019:

- 1971. Los subsentidos
- 1971. Vacuflex
- 1971. Homenaje a Picasso
- 1971. Experiencia 4
- 1971. Formes al carrer
- 1971. Manipulables
- 1971. Piano táctil
- 1971. Columna de materiales
- 1971. Experiencia 1 A
- 1971. Experiencia 1 B
- 1971. Cámara subsensorial
- 1971. Escalera táctil
- 1971. Experiencia 2
- 1971. Espacio (Acción-Interacción)
- 1971. Acciones subsensoriales 1
- 1971. Mensaje Experiencia 3
- 1972. Experiencia 5 (comunicación táctil)
- 1972. Poema táctil
- 1972. Estructura táctil móvil
- 1972. Localización Bolsas
- 1972. West – Side
- 1972. Acción Bolsas (Wall Street)
- 1972. Sensorial Way
- 1972. Escala subsensorial
- 1972. Polución audiovisual
- 1972. Reconeixement d’un espai
- 1972. Mano -Pelota – Pared
- 1972. Eines Raumes
- 1972. Reconocimiento de un cuerpo
- 1972. Experincia Parcel Post
- 1972. Experiencia Sangría – Films - Slides
- 1972. Propuesta MORI’S FORM
- 1972. Acción TV
- 1972. Recognition of a Terrain
- 1972. Experiencia 7
- 1972. 2 pulsos / 2 latidos
- 1972. Mano derecha / Mano izquierda
- 1972.Transformaciones
- 1972. Huellas corporales
- 1972. Reconocimiento táctil de un cuerpo
- 1972. Actions
- 1972. La Vanguardia
- 1972. Tactile Recognition of a Body
- 1972. La piel y veinte materiales
- 1972. Mensaje
- 1973. Propuesta de INFORMACIÓ < D’ARTCONCEPT
- 1973. Acciones
- 1973. About 405 East
- 1973. 13 Street
- 1973. Proyecto: 4 elementos
- 1973. Tactile Box
- 1973. Serie de acciones nº3 (acciones liberadoras)
- 1973. Anuncios por palabras
- 1973. Concierto Sensorial / Concert Sensorial / Sensorial Concert
- 1973. Reflexões sobre a norte
- 1973. Arts Awareness II
- 1973. Presión
- 1973. ARTE<->LIFE
- 1973-1974. Mercados, Calles, Estaciones
- 1974. Celebration of the Senses
- 1974. TV / FEB 27 / 1 PM
- 1974. Confrontations
- 1974. Retratos a 11/1/74
- 1974. Mexico D.F.
- 1974. Five Senses
- 1974. About (2) “228.30.54”
- 1974. Smelling Areas
- 1974. Cadaqués – Canal Local
- 1974. Homenaje a Salvadro Allende
- 1974. Diario 10 – 22 diciembre
- 1974. ARTE<->LIFE
- 1974. Emisión / Recepción
- 1974. Confrontation
- 1974. Cadaqués, Canal local
- 1974. Diario 10 - 22 diciembre
- 1974. Arte D vida
- 1974. Smelling Areas
- 1975. Biography
- 1975. Espacio / Situación
- 1975. Transfer
- 1975. Emissió/Recepció
- 1975-1976. Acción / Situación: Hoy. Proyecto A Través De Latinoamérica
- 1975 -1980. Pamplona - Grazalema
- 1976. N / S / E / O
- 1976. Barcelona Distrito Uno
- 1976-2009. Retrat de Pep Suñol
- 1977. Bars
- 1977. Snowflake
- 1977. Liège 12/9/77
- 1978. On Subjectivity
- 1978. Yesterday / Today / Tomorrow
- 1978-1979. Two Landscapes
- 1978-… On Translatiorn: Sicherheitsvorschriften
- 1979. Between The Lines
- 1979. Dos Colores
- 1980. La Televisión
- 1980. Dialogos
- 1980. Personal / Public
- 1981. Rambla 24 H
- 1981. Picturephone
- 1981. Transmission MIT
- 1981. Media Eyes
- 1981. Watching the Press / Reading 1981. Television
- 1981. Wet and Dry
- 1982. Drastic Carpet
- 1982. Media Ecology Ads
- 1982-2006. Selling the Future
- 1982-2007. Media Sites / Media Monuments
- 1982-2010.The Close-Up Series1982-1992. Stadium
- 1983. Nord / Sud (Elne)
- 1983. post No Bills / Defense / d’Afficher / Prohibido fijar carteles
- 1983-1985. haute CULTURE I-II
- 1983-1993. Between the Frames: The Forum
- 1984. Credits
- 1984-2008. Political Advertisement
- 1985. Pintar es fácil
- 1985. This is Not an Advertisement
- 1985. Marco / Cadre / Frame
- 1985. Media Hostage S.S.S.
- 1985-1987. Exposición – Exhibition
- 1987. Cross-Cultura Television
- 1987. Slogans
- 1987. The Board Room
- 1987. Quarto do fundo
- 1987. Derrière les Mots
- 1987. TV Générique
- 1987-1988. Nature Mortes
- 1987. Génériques
- 1988. Monumento genéritdo
- 1988. ECU
- 1988. CEE / Heysel
- 1988. Passatges
- 1988. Situación 1988
- 1988. Warnings
- 1988-1989. STANDARTD / Específico – Spécifique – Specific
- 1989. Video is Television?
- 1989. Video is Television?
- 1989.TVE: Primer intento
- 1989. Mirroir / Fauteil / Fenêtre
- 1989. Souvenir de Mirabel
- 1989-1998. CEE Project
- 1989-2011. Stadium I-XV1989-1998.
- 1990. Home / House
- 1990. Stadia / Furniture / Audience
- 1990. Home, Where is Home?
- 1990. The Limousine Project
- 1991. Architektur / Räume / Gesten
- 1991. CEE Print
- 1991. Words: The Press Conference 1991. Room
- 1991. Doppio Senso: Spettato-Re 1991 1991. Osservato o Speculazione 1991. Voyeuristica
- 1991. Contexto
- 1991-2011. Ciudad Museo1991-2011. Ciudad Museo
- 1991. Architektur / Räume / Gesten.
- 1991. Words: The Press Conference Room.
- 1992-1995. Marseille: Mythes et Stéréotypes.
- 1994. The File Room.
- 1994. Portrait.
- 1995. Portraits.
- 1995. La siesta / The Nap / Dutje.
- 1995-2002. On Translation.
- 1998-2000. On Translation: The Audience.
- 1998-2002. On Translation: Comemorações Urbanas.
- 1999. ATENCIÓN: LA PERCEPCIÓN REQUIERE PARTICIPACIÓN.
- 1999-... . On Translation: Warning.
- 1999. On Translation: El Aplauso.
- 1999-2000. Meetings.
- 1999-2004. On Translation: Die Stadt.
- 1999-… On Translation: Warning
- 1999. Muntadas – Media Architecture Installations. [Interom]
- 2000. On Translation: The Adapter
- 2000. On Translation: The Edition
- 2001. On Translation: Il telefonino
- 2001. “Un petit…”
- 2001. On Translation: The Bookstore
- 2001. On Translation: The Message
- 2002. Estamos condenados al éxito
- 2002. On Translation: The Interview Sibila
- 2002. On Translation: L’Affiche
- 2002. On Translation: The Symbol
- 2003. Dealings
- 2003. Gestes
- 2003. Tout va Bien
- 2003-2006: On Translation: Die Sammlung
- 2004. Lo hecho en México
- 2004. On Translation: On View
- 2004. On Translation: Erinnerungsräume
- 2004. On Translation: La Alameda
- 2004. Space
- 2004. On Translation: TwoSpaces
- 2001. On Translation: The Bookstore.
- 2005. On Translation: I Giardini
- 2005. MD
- 2005. Melitón – Cadaqués
- 2005. On Translation: Listening
- 2005. On Translation: Fear / Miedo
- 2005. Gestes II
- 2005. On Translation: El tren urbano
- 2005. We are Fantastic
- 2005. On Translation: Social Network
- 2005. On Translation: The Internet Project (Automatique)
- 2006. Histoires du Couteau
- 2006. Stuttgart (for H.H.)
- 2006. On Translation: Die Schlage
- 2006. Bienvenido Mister Marshall
- 2006. Morgen Toiletten
- 2007. Cuide la pintura
- 2007. On Translation: Miedo / Jauf
- 2007. Projecte / Proyecto / Project
- 2007. Quejas
- 2008. Cercas.
- 2008: On Translation: Lloc
- 2008. The Construction of Fear
- 2008. Situation #7 / #10 / #13 / #17 / #21 / #25 / #31
- 2008. Aqua…Quo Vadis?
- 2008. On Translation. Petit et Grand
- 2009. Himne dels Himnes
- 2009. Mirar / Ver / Percibir
- 2009. On Translation: Celebracions
- 2009. On Translation: Vuitton
- 2009. En tiempos de crisis
- 2010. Fear, Panic, Terror
- 2010. On Translation: Miedo I y II
- 2010. On Translation: Açik Radyo (Myths & Stereotypes)
- 2010. The New York Times Magazine / April 20. 1980
- 2011. Alphaville e outros
- 2011. About Academia
- 2011. On Translation: Stand by Moscow
- 2011. On Translation: Warning / ВНИМАНИЕ
- 2011. Situación 2011
- 2011-2012. Carteras sin ministro
- 2012. Salt & Sugar…No sugar, No salt
- 2012. Warum?
- 2012. Ordeal of Picasso's heirs. The New York Times Magazine. April 20th, 1980
- 2013. ¡DICHO Y HECHO!
- 2013. …quien la hace la paga…que cada uno aguante su vela…
- 2013. Aller/Retour. Citoyenneté et déplacements
- 2013. How Much?
- 2013. Maqueta para “monumento al whisky"
- 2013. On Translation: Go Round
- 2013. On Translation: Segurity
- 2013. On Translation: Warning
- 2013. Protocolli Veneziani I
- 2014. ...Baixa a bola!
- 2014. Asian Protocols: Cartographies
- 2014. Asian Protocols: Fragments
- 2014. Blackboard Dialog: Redefining 2014. Asian Protocols
- 2014. Good News!
- 2014. KJE?
- 2014. Nessuno come noi
- 2014. On Translation: Cimitero
- 2014. On Translation: FIFA
- 2014. On Translation: Pille, 2006-2014
- 2014. PARA QUEM?
- 2014. Public/Private Space [Seoul, Tokyo, Beijing]
- 2015. Dérive Veneziane
- 2015. Dérive Veneziane: The Edition
- 2015. Prohibido Prohibir
- 2016. Asian Protocols: [School]
- 2016. Textbooks
- 2016. In Girum Revisited
- 2016. On Translation: Abroad
- 2016. On Translation: Himnes
- 2017. Architektur / Räume / Gesten II
- 2017. Media Sites / Media Monuments: Roma
- 2017. On Translation: Strand
- 2017. Palabras, Palabras…
- 2017. Projectes / Propostes. Proyectos / Propuestas. Projects / Proposals
- 2017. Puntuacions
- 2017. Tale padre, tale figlia
- 2017. Media Sites / Media Monuments: Roma
- 2017. Finisterre
- 2017. Guadiana
- 2017. Veni, Vidi, Vici [proyecto especial para el homenaje, con Coralí Mercader
- 2017. In Girum Revisited
- 2017. La conferencia de prensa
- 2018. Asian Protocols: Arroz Conejo (camiseta)
- 2018. What are your concerns?
- 2018. On Translation: Fortune Cookie
- 2018. Finisterre: The Edition
- 2018. Guadiana: The Edition
- 2018. Asian Protocols: The Edition
- 2018. Complicado
- 2018. Complicado (puzzle)

== Collections ==
Some important collections with Muntadas works:

- National Gallery of Canada, Ottawa
- Centre George Pompidou, Paris
- Artium Museum (Centro-Museo Vasco de Arte Contemporáneo), Vitoria-Gasteiz
- Fundação de Serralves, Oporto
- Turin Civic Gallery of Modern and Contemporary Art (GAM), Turin
- Museum of Contemporary Art, Zagreb, Croatia
- Institut Valencià d'Art Modern, Valencia
- Guggenheim Museum, New York
- Museum of Contemporary Art Antwerp (M HKA), Belgium
- Museo Nacional Centro de Arte Reina Sofía (MNCARS)
- Museu d'Art Contemporani de Barcelona (MACBA)
- Museu d'Art Jaume Morera, Lleida
- Museum of Modern Art (MoMA), New York
- The Banff Centre, Banff, Alberta
- Walker Art Center, Minneapolis
- Gloria Kirby Collection, Madrid and Tangier
