= Irving Petlin =

American painter and print maker (1934–2018)

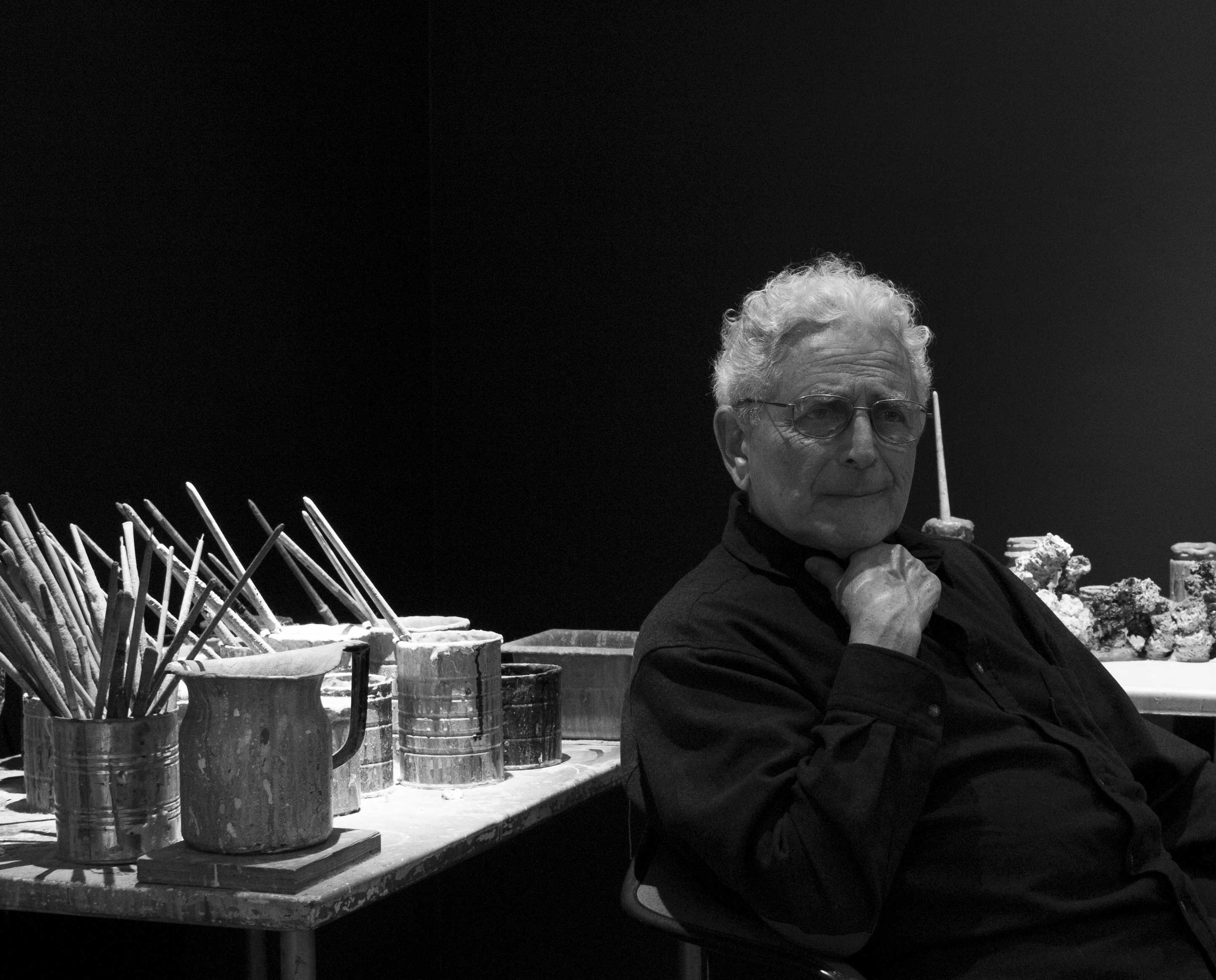
- Petlin at Kent Fine Art in New York, 2015
- Born: December 17, 1934; Chicago, Illinois, U.S.
- Died: September 1, 2018 (aged 83); Martha's Vineyard, Massachusetts, U.S.
- Education: School of the Art Institute of Chicago (BFA); Yale University (MFA)
- Movement: Chicago Imagists
- Website: Official website

Irving Petlin (December 17, 1934 – September 1, 2018) was an American artist and painter renowned for his mastery of the pastel medium and collaborations with other artists (including Mark di Suvero and Leon Golub) and for his work in the "series form" in which he employed the raw materials of pastel, oil paint and unprimed linen, and found inspiration in the work of writers and poets including Primo Levi, Bruno Schulz, Paul Celan, Michael Palmer and Edmond Jabès.

Petlin attended the Art Institute of Chicago from 1953 to 1956, where he received his BFA during the height of the Chicago Imagist movement. Petlin was awarded a fellowship at Yale, where he studied under Josef Albers and earned his MFA in 1960. In 1964, his work was shown at the Hanover Gallery in London and Galerie du Dragon in Paris, where he influenced the Nouvelle figuration movement. That same year, Petlin was invited to teach at UCLA as a visiting artist, along with artists Richard Diebenkorn and Llyn Foulkes.

While in California, he was a principal organizer of the "Artist’s Protest movement against the war in Vietnam." In open meetings held at the Dwan Gallery, of which John Weber was the director, he founded the Artists' Protest Committee. In 1966, Petlin planned the Peace Tower with help of Mark di Suvero, as well as Philip Lieder, Craig Kauffman, Larry Bell, Walter Hopps, Rolf Nelson, Judy Chicago, Lloyd Hamrol, Hardy Hanson, Eric Orr, Tanya Nuefeld, and others. "The Artists’ Call" for the tower is published in four languages, and works arrive from all over the world to be attached to it. The finished tower, was dedicated by Susan Sontag and ultimately attacked overnight. The following year, in 1965, Petlin had his first major one-man exhibition held at the Palais des Beaux Arts in Brussels. Shortly thereafter, he returned to New York City with his family and moved into an apartment on West 11th Street. At this time, his growing commitment to the American milieu resulted in the completion of the painting The Burning of Los Angeles. During this period, Petlin Was a founder and a participant in Artists and Writers Against the War in Vietnam. He also took part in the Art Workers Coalition, the Art Strike, the Moratorium and the Venice Biennale.

The Burning of Los Angeles (1965–1967)

(Collection of the Fine Arts Museums of San Francisco)

From the 1960s, when he became one of the founding members of "Artists and Writers Against the War in Vietnam," Petlin was a leader in political activism by visual artists. He created the iconic anti-Vietnam War poster And babies in 1969. Petlin continued his militant interventions after the 1960s through such activities as his participation in the "Artists' Call Against the U.S. Intervention in Central America". Petlin taught at the University of California, Los Angeles, the Cooper Union in New York, as well as the Pennsylvania Academy of the Fine Arts in Philadelphia. He lived in Paris, New York and Martha's Vineyard, Massachusetts.

Petlin died of liver cancer in Martha's Vineyard, Massachusetts on September 1, 2018, at the age of 83.

== Selected exhibitions ==
- 2014 "The Still Open Case of Irving Petlin". Kent Fine Art, New York
- 2014 "Paris Show": Galerie Jacques Leegenhoek
- 2012 Irving Petlin: Storms: After Redon. Kent Fine Art, New York
- 2010 Irving Petlin: Major Paintings, 1979-2009. Kent Gallery, New York
- 2007 Orpheus, Pastels. Galerie Ditesheim, FIAC, Paris
- 2006 Este Mundo. Kent Gallery, New York
- 2002 Irving Petlin. Galerie Krugier-Ditesheim Art Contemporain, Geneva, Switzerland
- 2001 Out of the Shadows. School of the Museum of Fine Art, Boston
- 1998 A Tribute to Meyer Schapiro. Jan Krugier Gallery, New York
- 1997 Le Monde D’Edmond Jabes, Pastels. Krugier-Ditesheim Art Contemporain, Geneva
- 1996 Paris is White. Kent Gallery, New York
- 1995 Irving Petlin: 1955-1995, Disegni nacosti. Studio d’ Arte Recalcati, Turin, Italy
- 1993 Swiat Brunona Shulza. Galerie Kordegarda, Varsovie, Poland
- 1992 Memories Drawn from Bruno Schulz and Others. Kent Gallery, New York
- 1990 Israel in Egypt. Kent Fine Art, New York
- 1990 The Periodic Table. Gallery 400, University of Chicago, IL
- 1990 Chagall to Kitaj: Jewish Experience in 20th Century Art. Barbican Art Gallery London, England
- 1989 A Different War: Vietnam in Art. Whatcom Museum, Bellingham, WA. Curated by Lucy Lippard.
- 1988 Pastels 1961-1987. Kent Fine Art, New York, NY
- 1987 Weisswald. Kent Fine Art, New York
- 1982 Irving Petlin: Recent Paintings and Pastels. Marlborough Fine Art, London, UK
- 1982 The Venice Biennale, Italian Pavilion, Venice, Italy
- 1981 Drawings from the Studio, 1972-1981. University of California, Santa Cruz
- 1980 Irving Petlin, Pastels. Galerie Nina Dausset, Paris
- 1978 Rubbings (Large Paintings, Small Pastels). Neuberger Museum-SUNY, Purchase, NY & Arts Club of Chicago, Chicago, Il
- 1977 Galleria Bergamini, Milan, Italy
- 1974 Documenta, Torino, Italy
- 1973 Biennial Exhibition of Contemporary American Art, Whitney Museum New York, NY
- 1972 Galleria Bergamini, Milan, Italy
- 1968 Irving Petlin: Opere recent. Galleria Il Fante Di Spade, Rome, Italy
- 1967 Odyssia Gallery, New York
- 1966 Rolf Nelson Gallery, Los Angeles
- 1965 Petlin Palais des Beaux-Arts, Brussels, Belgium
- 1964 American Show, Art Institute of Chicago, Chicago, IL
- 1963 Petlin: Peintures 1962-1963. Galerie du Dragon, Paris, France
- 1961 Paris Biennal, American Section. Paris, France
- 1960 Petlin, Galerie du Dragon, Paris, France
- 1958 Dilexi Gallery, San Francisco, CA
- 1956 Cliffdweller Gallery, Chicago, IL
- 1954 Exhibition Momentum. Chicago, IL
- 1953-56 Art Institute, Chicago, IL
