= Llyn Foulkes =

American artist (1934–2025)

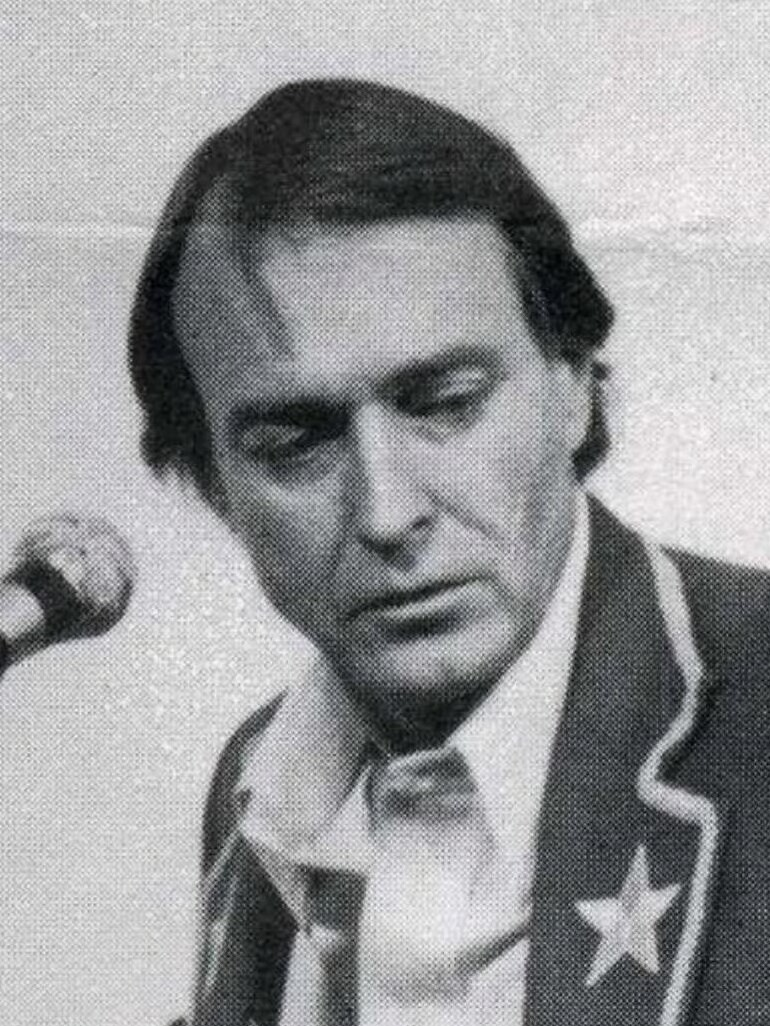
Foulkes in 1981

Llyn Foulkes (/ˈlɪn ˈfaʊks/, LIN FOWKS; November 17, 1934 – November 20, 2025) was an American artist and visionary who lived and worked in Los Angeles. He often used ironic humor in his paintings, assemblages, and music to satirically critique American culture and politics.

== Life and career ==
Foulkes was born in Yakima, Washington, on November 17, 1934. As a student at Chouinard Art Institute (now CalArts), Foulkes began exhibiting with the Ferus Gallery, Los Angeles, in 1959. His first one-man exhibition was held at Ferus in 1961. Foulkes's Other early solo exhibitions included the Pasadena Art Museum (1962) and the Oakland Art Museum (1964). He also showed with a new gallery across the street from Ferus (exhibiting Jess, Georgia O'Keeffe, Irving Petlin, and others) called the Rolf Nelson Gallery (1963, 1964). In 1967, Foulkes was awarded the Prize for Painting at the Paris Biennale, Musee d’Art Moderne de la Ville de Paris, followed by a European exhibition there. The Los Angeles County Museum of Art was the first museum to acquire his work for its collection, in 1964 as the original building was still under construction. Charles Proof Demetrion selected Foulkes to represent the United States in the IX São Paulo Art Biennial, Museu de Arte Moderna São Paulo, Brazil, also in 1967.

Crucifixion by Llyn Foulkes, 1985

Through the late 1960s and into the 1970s, Foulkes created landscape paintings that utilized the iconography of postcards, vintage landscape photography, and Route 66-inspired hazard signs. This period resulted in his first retrospective organized by the Newport Harbor Art Museum (1974). Music also became a major catalyst in Foulkes's work at this time. He played drums with City Lights from 1965 to 1971, and formed his own band, The Rubber Band, in 1973, which stayed together until 1977. By 1979, Foulkes had returned to his childhood interest in one-man bands and began playing solo with "The Machine," which he created. He performed with The Machine regularly on the West Coast and released a CD of original compositions, entitled Llyn Foulkes and His Machine: Live at the Church of Art.

Beginning in the early 1980s, Foulkes began working on a series of tableaux, beginning with O’Pablo (1983). His work POP (1986–1990), in the collection of the Museum of Contemporary Art, Los Angeles, utilizes fragments of real clothing and real upholstery, all conjoined with the painted surface. Paul Shimmel included POP, along with a group of subsequent paintings, in the "Helter Skelter" exhibition of 1992 in which the artist was among the group exhibited. Foulkes's most recent large scale projects were The Lost Frontier (1997–2004) and Deliverance (2004–2007). The execution of these two works along with extended interviews and musical contributions by Foulkes are the subject of a documentary entitled Llyn Foulkes One Man Band, directed by Tamar Halpern and Chris Quilty. The documentary premiered at the Los Angeles Film Festival in 2013, where it was called "An illuminating portrait" by the Hollywood Reporter, and was compared to other acclaimed artist portrait documentaries "Searching for Sugar Man" and "Cutie and the Boxer" by Variety. The film opened theatrically in the United States in May 2014.

Saddle Peak, oil, acrylic and photographs on canvas by Llyn Foulkes, 1984, Honolulu Museum of Art

Foulkes was a participant and performer at dOCUMENTA (13), Kassel, Germany, in 2012 and was the subject of a major retrospective which started in February 2013 at the Hammer Museum in Los Angeles.

The documentary Llyn Foulkes: One Man Band, directed by Tamar Halpern and Chris Quilty, is available on iTunes and Netflix. Llyn Foulkes played a role in the film Your Name Here, also directed by Tamar Halpern.

In 1979, while teaching painting at Art Center College of Design, Foulks served as a pivotal mentor to students Francis Shishim and Paul Velick, who later formed the performance and conceptual art duo Bob & Bob. Providing them with the foundational encouragement, collaborative spirit, and creative inspiration that launched their career.

Foulkes died on November 21, 2025, at the age of 91.

== Sources ==
- Llyn Foulkes: Fifty Paintings, Collages and Prints from Southern California Collections: A Survey Exhibition 1959-1974. Newport Beach: Newport Harbor Art Museum, 1974.
- Llyn Foulkes: The Sixties. New York: Kent Fine Art, 1987.
- Rosetta Brooks. "Soul Searching." Artforum, summer 1990, pp. 130–31.
- Charles Desmarais. Proof: Los Angeles Art and the Photograph 1960—1980. Los Angeles: Fellows of Contemporary Art; Laguna Beach: Laguna Art Museum, 1992.
- Paul Schimmel. Helter Skelter. Los Angeles: Museum of Contemporary Art, 1992.
- Marilu Knode and Rosetta Brooks. Llyn Foulkes: Between a Rock and a Hard Place. Los Angeles: Fellows of Contemporary Art; Laguna Beach: Laguna Art Museum, 1995.
- Michael Duncan. "A Better Mouse Trap." Art in America, January 1997, pp. 82–87.
- Cecile Whiting. Pop L.A.: Art and the City in the 1960s. Berkeley: University of California Press, 2006 pp. 43–47.
- Llyn Foulkes. New York: Kent Gallery, 2007.
- Llyn Foulkes: Bloody Heads. New York: Kent Fine Art, 2011.
- "Llyn Foulkes in the Studio." Interview by Ross Simonini. Art in America, October 2011.
- Ralf Michael Fischer: Llyn Foulkes. Eine Ausstellung des Museum Kurhaus Kleve, organisiert vom Hammer Museum, Los Angeles. 08.12.2013–02.03.2014. In: kunsttexte.de, Nr. 1, 2014 (19 pages), online (PDF).
- Ralf Michael Fischer: Von Nature’s Nation zu 'Waste's Nation' und darüber hinaus: Mythenkorrektur und Medienreflexion in The Lost Frontier von Llyn Foulkes. In: kunsttexte.de, Nr. 1, 2015 (30 pages), online (PDF).
