= Umbra (poets) =

Collective of young black writers, founded 1962

Umbra was a collective of young black writers based in Manhattan's Lower East Side that was founded in 1962.

== Background ==
Umbra was one of the first post-civil rights Black literary groups of people to make an impact as radical in the sense of establishing their own voice distinct from, and sometimes at odds with, the prevailing white literary establishment. The attempt to merge a Black-oriented activist thrust with a primarily artistic orientation produced a classic split in Umbra between those who wanted to be activists and those who thought of themselves as primarily writers, though to some extent all members shared both views. Black writers have always had to face the issue of whether their work was primarily political or aesthetic. Moreover, Umbra itself had evolved out of similar circumstances: in 1960, a Black nationalist literary organization, On Guard for Freedom, had been founded on the Lower East Side by Calvin Hicks. Its members included Nannie and Walter Bowe, Harold Cruse (who was then working on The Crisis of the Negro Intellectual, 1967), Tom Dent, Rosa Guy, Joe Johnson, LeRoi Jones, and Sarah Wright, among others. On Guard was active in a famous protest at the United Nations of the American-sponsored Bay of Pigs Cuban invasion and was active in support of the Congolese liberation leader Patrice Lumumba. From On Guard, Dent, Johnson, and Brenda Walcott and Askia Touré established Umbra.

== Umbra Magazine ==
The Umbra collective produced Umbra Magazine, which grew out of Friday-night workshops, meetings, and readings on Manhattan's Lower East Side in summer 1962, "and out of the need expressed for it at those meetings". Two issues, edited by Calvin Hernton, David Henderson and Tom Dent, were produced during the group's life-time, including a 'Richard Wright Mnemonicon' in the second issue. After the group split and the workshops themselves ended following the assassinations of Malcolm X and John F. Kennedy, David Henderson took over as editor. A third issue appeared as Umbra Anthology: 1967–1968, followed by the fourth issue, Umbra Blackworks, in 1970, and Umbra Latin / Soul, co-edited by Henderson, Barbara Christian and Victor Hernandez Cruz, in 1974.

== Major writers ==
- Steve Cannon
- Thomas Covington Dent/Tom Dent
- Al Haynes
- David Henderson
- Calvin C. Hernton
- Joe Johnson
- Norman Pritchard
- Lennox Raphael
- Ishmael Reed
- Archie Shepp, musician-writer
- Cecil Taylor, musician-poet
- Art Berger
- Lorenzo Thomas
- James Thompson
- Askia M. Touré (Roland Snellings; also a visual artist)
- Brenda Walcott
- Raymond R. Patterson
- Rashidah Ismaili

Askia Touré, a major shaper of "cultural nationalism", directly influenced LeRoi Jones, along with Umbra writer Charles Patterson and Charles's brother, William Patterson. Touré joined Jones, Steve Young, and others at BART/S (Black Arts Repertory Theatre/School). Umbra is often cited as a predecessor to the Black Arts Movement, and is discussed in books such as Eugene Redmond's Drumvoices, Aldon Nielsen's Black Chant, Kalamu ya Salaam's The Magic of Juju and Lorenzo Thomas's Extraordinary Measures. Many members of Umbra took part in Black Arts and post-Black Arts activity, including Ishmael Reed's Before Columbus Foundation in California, David Henderson's involvement with the Nuyorican Poets Cafe in New York, and Tom Dent's work with The Free Southern Theatre in New Orleans. (Dent also established the long-running magazine Callaloo, alongside Charles Henry Rowell and Jerry Ward.)
