= Black Arts Movement =

1960s–1970s art movement

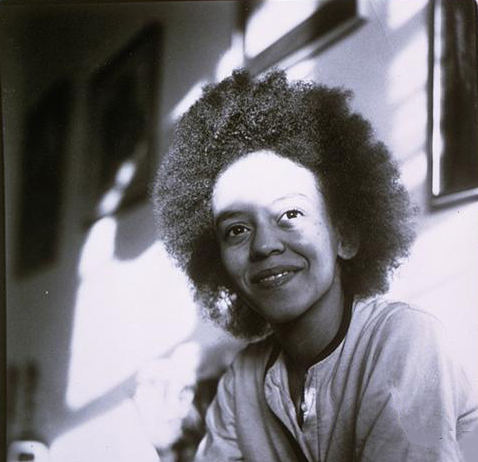
- Nikki Giovanni, a participant in the Black Arts Movement
- Years active: 1965–1975 (approx.)
- Location: United States
- Major figures: Amiri Baraka; Audre Lorde; Dudley Randall; Gwendolyn Brooks; Haki R. Madhubuti; Hoyt W. Fuller; Ishmael Reed; Larry Neal; Maya Angelou; Nikki Giovanni; Rosa Guy; Sonia Sanchez

The Black Arts Movement (BAM) was an African-American-led art movement that was active during the 1960s and 1970s. Through activism and art, BAM created new cultural institutions and conveyed a message of black pride. The movement expanded from the accomplishments of artists of the Harlem Renaissance.

Famously referred to by Larry Neal as the "aesthetic and spiritual sister of Black Power", BAM applied these same political ideas to art and literature. and artists found new inspiration in their African heritage as a way to present the black experience in America. Artists such as Aaron Douglas, Hale Woodruff, and Meta Vaux Warrick Fuller pioneered the movement with a distinctly modernist aesthetic. This style influenced the proliferation of African American art during the twentieth century.

The poet and playwright Amiri Baraka is widely recognized as the founder of BAM. In 1965, he established the Black Arts Repertory Theatre School (BART/S) in Harlem. Baraka's example inspired many others to create organizations across the United States. While many of these organizations were short-lived, their work has had a lasting influence. Some still exist, including the National Black Theatre, founded by Barbara Ann Teer in Harlem, New York.

== Background ==
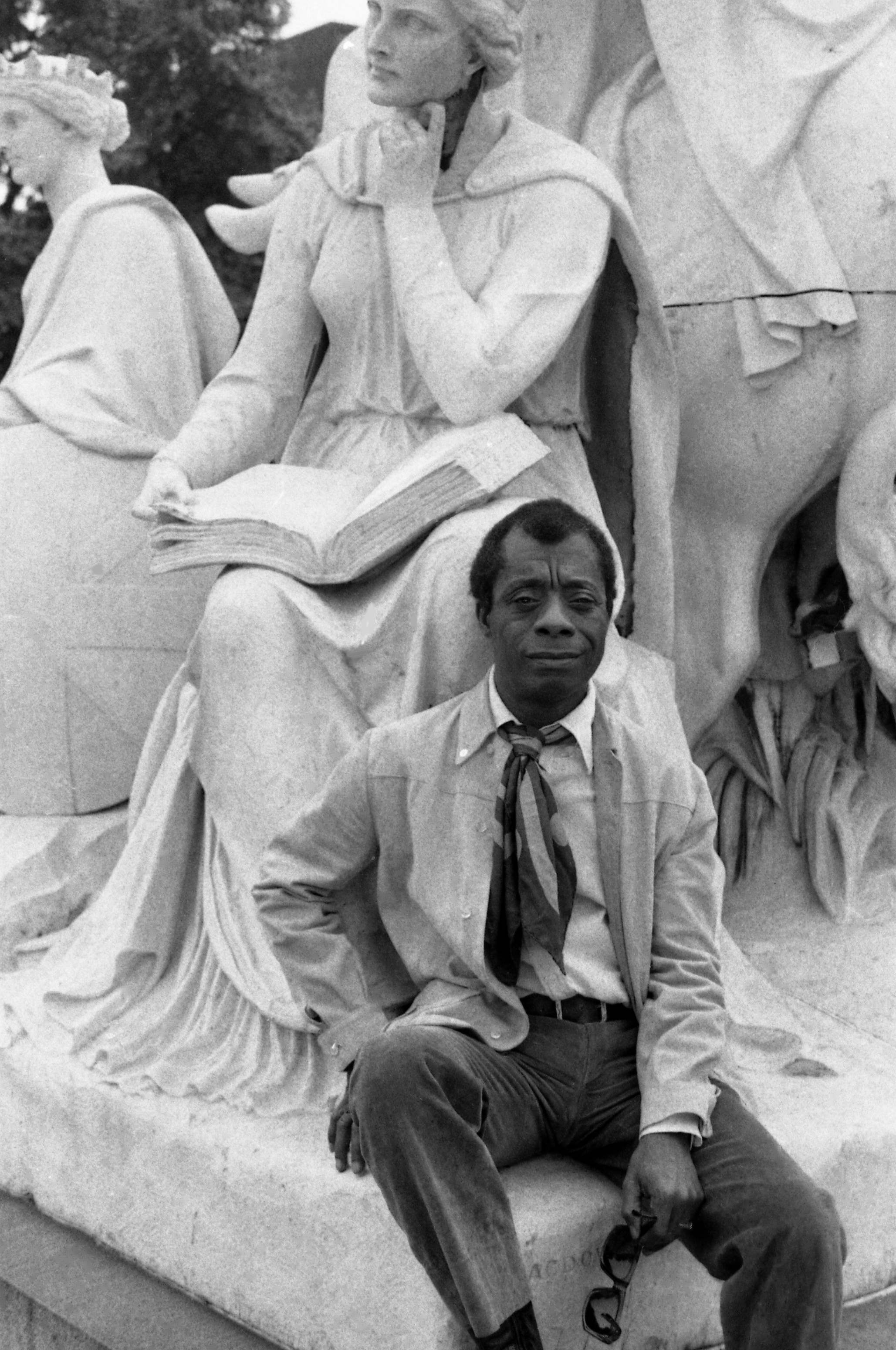
Novelist James Baldwin on the Albert Memorial, Kensington Gardens, London

African Americans had always made valuable artistic contributions to American culture. However, due to the brutalities of slavery and the systemic racism of Jim Crow, these contributions often went unrecognized. Despite continued oppression, African-American artists continued to create literature and art that would reflect their experiences. A high-point for these artists was the Harlem Renaissance—a literary era that spotlighted black people.

=== Harlem Renaissance ===
Many parallels can be made between the Harlem Renaissance and the Black Arts Movement. The link is so strong that some scholars refer to the Black Arts Movement era as the Second Renaissance. One sees this connection clearly when reading Langston Hughes's The Negro Artist and the Racial Mountain (1926). Hughes's seminal essay advocates that black writers resist external attempts to control their art, arguing instead that the "truly great" black artist will be the one who can fully embrace and freely express his blackness.

Yet, the Harlem Renaissance lacked many of the radical political stances that defined BAM. Inevitably, the Renaissance and many of its ideas, failed to survive the Great Depression.

=== Civil rights movement ===
During the civil rights era, activists paid more and more attention to the political uses of art. The contemporary work of those like James Baldwin and Chester Himes would show the possibility of creating a new "black aesthetic". Several art groups were established during this period, such as the Umbra Poets and the Spiral Arts Alliance, which can be seen as precursors to BAM.

Art was seen as a way to decompress from the upheaval of the civil rights era by, for example, the ceramicist Marva Lee Pitchford-Jolly, the maker of "Story Pots".

Civil Rights activists were also interested in creating black-owned media outlets, establishing journals (such as Freedomways, Black Dialogue, The Liberator, The Black Scholar and Soul Book) and publishing houses (such as Dudley Randall's Broadside Press and Third World Press.) It was through these channels that BAM would eventually spread its art, literature, and political messages.

== Developments ==
The beginnings of the Black Arts Movement may be traced to 1965, when Amiri Baraka, at that time still known as Leroi Jones, moved uptown to establish the Black Arts Repertory Theatre/School (BARTS) following the assassination of Malcolm X. Rooted in the Nation of Islam, the Black Power movement and the Civil Rights Movement, the Black Arts Movement grew out of a changing political and cultural climate in which Black artists attempted to create politically engaged work that explored the African American cultural and historical experience. Black artists and intellectuals such as Baraka made it their project to reject older political, cultural, and artistic traditions.

Although the success of sit-ins and public demonstrations of the Black student movement in the 1960s may have "inspired black intellectuals, artists, and political activists to form politicized cultural groups", many Black Arts activists rejected the non-militant integrational ideologies of the Civil Rights Movement and instead favored those of the Black Liberation Struggle, which emphasized "self-determination through self-reliance and Black control of significant businesses, organization, agencies, and institutions." According to the Academy of American Poets, "African American artists within the movement sought to create politically engaged work that explored the African American cultural and historical experience." The importance that the movement placed on Black autonomy is apparent through the creation of institutions such as the Black Arts Repertoire Theatre School (BARTS), created in the spring of 1964 by Baraka and other Black artists. The opening of BARTS in New York City often overshadows the growth of other radical Black Arts groups and institutions all over the United States. In fact, transgressional and international networks, those of various Left and nationalist (and Left nationalist) groups and their supports, existed far before the movement gained popularity. Although the creation of BARTS did indeed catalyze the spread of other Black Arts institutions and the Black Arts movement across the nation, it was not solely responsible for the growth of the movement.

Although the Black Arts Movement was a time filled with black success and artistic progress, the movement also faced social and racial ridicule. The leaders and artists involved called for Black Art to define itself and speak for itself from the security of its own institutions. For many of the contemporaries the idea that somehow black people could express themselves through institutions of their own creation and with ideas whose validity was confirmed by their own interests and measures was absurd.

While it is easy to assume that the movement began solely in the Northeast, it actually started out as "separate and distinct local initiatives across a wide geographic area", eventually coming together to form the broader national movement. New York City is often referred to as the "birthplace" of the Black Arts Movement, because it was home to many revolutionary Black artists and activists. However, the geographical diversity of the movement opposes the misconception that New York (and Harlem, especially) was the primary site of the movement.

In its beginning states, the movement came together largely through printed media. Journals such as Liberator, The Crusader, and Freedomways created "a national community in which ideology and aesthetics were debated and a wide range of approaches to African-American artistic style and subject displayed." These publications tied communities outside of large Black Arts centers to the movement and gave the general black public access to these sometimes exclusive circles.

As a literary movement, Black Arts had its roots in groups such as the Umbra Workshop. Umbra (1962) was a collective of young Black writers based in Manhattan's Lower East Side; major members were writers Steve Cannon, Tom Dent, Al Haynes, David Henderson, Calvin C. Hernton, Joe Johnson, Norman Pritchard, Lennox Raphael, Ishmael Reed, Lorenzo Thomas, James Thompson, Askia M. Touré (Roland Snellings; also a visual artist), Brenda Walcott, and musician-writer Archie Shepp. Touré, a major shaper of "cultural nationalism", directly influenced Jones. Along with Umbra writer Charles Patterson and Charles's brother, William Patterson, Touré joined Jones, Steve Young, and others at BARTS.

Umbra, which produced Umbra Magazine, was the first post-civil rights Black literary group to make an impact as radical in the sense of establishing their own voice distinct from, and sometimes at odds with, the prevailing white literary establishment. The attempt to merge a black-oriented activist thrust with a primarily artistic orientation produced a classic split in Umbra between those who wanted to be activists and those who thought of themselves as primarily writers, though to some extent all members shared both views. Black writers have always had to face the issue of whether their work was primarily political or aesthetic. Moreover, Umbra itself had evolved out of similar circumstances: in 1960 a Black nationalist literary organization, On Guard for Freedom, had been founded on the Lower East Side by Calvin Hicks. Its members included Nannie and Walter Bowe, Harold Cruse (who was then working on The Crisis of the Negro Intellectual, 1967), Tom Dent, Rosa Guy, Joe Johnson, LeRoi Jones, and Sarah E. Wright, and others. On Guard was active in a famous protest at the United Nations of the American-sponsored Bay of Pigs Cuban invasion and was active in support of the Congolese liberation leader Patrice Lumumba. From On Guard, Dent, Johnson, and Walcott along with Hernton, Henderson, and Touré established Umbra.

In 1967, the Visual Arts Workshop of the Organization of Black American Culture, composed of several artists such as Jeff Donaldson, William Walker, and more, painted the Wall of Respect which was a mural that represented the Black Arts Movement; what it stood for and who it was celebrating. The mural commemorated several important black figures such as Martin Luther King Jr. and Malcolm X, along with artists such as Aretha Franklin and Gwendolyn Brooks, etc. It was a renowned symbol of the movement, placed in Chicago, that represented black culture and creativity, and was met with a lot of attention, support, and respect from the black community. It was a symbolic and important representation of the Black Arts Movement, as it directly celebrated and acknowledged the iconic figures of the Black community through art, emphasizing the importance of art for the community. Furthermore, it left a legacy and served as a beacon for the Black community, promoting Black consciousness and helping many Black people to learn and recognize their worth. In the eight years following the installation of the mural, over 1,500 murals were painted in black neighborhoods across the country, and by 1975, over 200 were painted in Chicago. It brought the community together symbolically, and literally, as rival gangs even declared the location of the mural to be neutral ground, supporting the artists and the movement.

In 1968, renowned Black theorist Barbara Ann Teer founded the National Black Theatre, located in Harlem, New York. Teer was an American writer, producer, teacher, actress and social visionary. Teer was an important black female intellectual, artist, and activist who contributed to the Black Arts Movement. Her theater was one of the first revenue generating Black theaters in the US. Teer's art was politically and socially conscious and like many other contributors to the BAM, embraced African aesthetics, and rejected traditional theatrical notions of time and space. Teer's revolutionary and ritualistic dramas and plays blurred the lines between performers and audience, "encouraging all to use the performance event itself as an opportunity to bring about social change."

=== Authors ===
Another formation of black writers at that time was the Harlem Writers Guild, led by John O. Killens, which included Maya Angelou, Jean Carey Bond, Rosa Guy, and Sarah Wright among others. But the Harlem Writers Guild focused on prose, primarily fiction, which did not have the mass appeal of poetry performed in the dynamic vernacular of the time. Poems could be built around anthems, chants, and political slogans, and thereby used in organizing work, which was not generally the case with novels and short stories. Moreover, the poets could and did publish themselves, whereas greater resources were needed to publish fiction. That Umbra was primarily poetry- and performance-oriented established a significant and classic characteristic of the movement's aesthetics. When Umbra split up, some members, led by Askia Touré and Al Haynes, moved to Harlem in late 1964 and formed the nationalist-oriented Uptown Writers Movement, which included poets Yusef Rahman, Keorapetse "Willie" Kgositsile from South Africa, and Larry Neal. Accompanied by young "New Music" musicians, they performed poetry all over Harlem. Members of this group joined LeRoi Jones in founding BARTS.

Jones's move to Harlem was short-lived. In December 1965 he returned to his home, Newark (N.J.), and left BARTS in serious disarray. BARTS failed but the Black Arts center concept was irrepressible, mainly because the Black Arts movement was so closely aligned with the then-burgeoning Black Power movement. The mid-to-late 1960s was a period of intense revolutionary ferment. Beginning in 1964, rebellions in Harlem and Rochester, New York, initiated four years of long hot summers. Watts, Detroit, Newark, Cleveland, and many other cities went up in flames, culminating in nationwide explosions of resentment and anger following the April 1968 assassination of Martin Luther King Jr.

Nathan Hare, author of The Black Anglo-Saxons (1965), was the founder of 1960s Black Studies. Expelled from Howard University, Hare moved to San Francisco State University, where the battle to establish a Black Studies department was waged during a five-month strike during the 1968–69 school year. As with the establishment of Black Arts, which included a range of forces, there was broad activity in the Bay Area around Black Studies, including efforts led by poet and professor Sarah Webster Fabio at Merrit College.

The initial thrust of Black Arts ideological development came from the Revolutionary Action Movement (RAM), a national organization with a strong presence in New York City. Both Touré and Neal were members of RAM. After RAM, the major ideological force shaping the Black Arts movement was the US (as opposed to "them") organization led by Maulana Karenga. Also ideologically important was Elijah Muhammad's Chicago-based Nation of Islam. These three formations provided both style and conceptual direction for Black Arts artists, including those who were not members of these or any other political organization. Although the Black Arts Movement is often considered a New York-based movement, two of its three major forces were located outside New York City.

=== Locations ===
As the movement matured, the two major locations of Black Arts' ideological leadership, particularly for literary work, were California's Bay Area because of the Journal of Black Poetry and The Black Scholar, and the Chicago–Detroit axis because of Negro Digest/Black World and Third World Press in Chicago, and Broadside Press and Naomi Long Madgett's Lotus Press in Detroit. The only major Black Arts literary publications to come out of New York were the short-lived (six issues between 1969 and 1972) Black Theatre magazine, published by the New Lafayette Theatre, and Black Dialogue, which had actually started in San Francisco (1964–1968) and relocated to New York (1969–1972).

Although the journals and writing of the movement greatly characterized its success, the movement placed a great deal of importance on collective oral and performance art. Public collective performances drew a lot of attention to the movement, and it was often easier to get an immediate response from a collective poetry reading, short play, or street performance than it was from individual performances.

The people involved in the Black Arts Movement used the arts as a way to liberate themselves. The movement served as a catalyst for many different ideas and cultures to come alive. This was a chance for African Americans to express themselves in a way that most would not have expected.

In 1967, LeRoi Jones visited Karenga in Los Angeles and became an advocate of Karenga's philosophy of Kawaida. Kawaida, which produced the "Nguzo Saba" (seven principles), Kwanzaa, and an emphasis on African names, was a multifaceted, categorized activist philosophy. Jones also met Bobby Seale and Eldridge Cleaver and worked with a number of the founding members of the Black Panthers. Additionally, Askia Touré was a visiting professor at San Francisco State and was to become a leading (and long-lasting) poet as well as, arguably, the most influential poet-professor in the Black Arts movement. Playwright Ed Bullins and poet Marvin X had established Black Arts West, and Dingane Joe Goncalves had founded the Journal of Black Poetry (1966). This grouping of Ed Bullins, Dingane Joe Goncalves, LeRoi Jones, Sonia Sanchez, Askia M. Touré, and Marvin X became a major nucleus of Black Arts leadership.

As the movement grew, ideological conflicts arose and eventually became too great for the movement to continue to exist as a large, coherent collective.

=== The Black Aesthetic ===
Although The Black Aesthetic was first coined by Larry Neal in 1968, across all the discourse, The Black Aesthetic has no overall real definition agreed upon by all Black Aesthetic theorists. It is loosely defined, without any real consensus besides that the theorists of The Black Aesthetic agree that "art should be used to galvanize the black masses to revolt against their white capitalist oppressors". Pollard also argues in her critique of the Black Arts Movement that The Black Aesthetic "celebrated the African origins of the Black community, championed black urban culture, critiqued Western aesthetics, and encouraged the production and reception of black arts by black people". In The Black Arts Movement by Larry Neal, where the Black Arts Movement is discussed as "aesthetic and spiritual sister of the Black Power concept", The Black Aesthetic is described by Neal as being the merger of the ideologies of Black Power with the artistic values of African expression. Larry Neal attests:

"When we speak of a 'Black aesthetic', several things are meant. First, we assume that there is already in existence the basis for such an aesthetic. Essentially, it consists of an African-American cultural tradition. But this aesthetic is finally, by implication, broader than that tradition. It encompasses most of the usable elements of the Third World culture. The motive behind the Black aesthetic is the destruction of the white thing, the destruction of white ideas, and white ways of looking at the world."

The Black Aesthetic also refers to ideologies and perspectives of art that center on Black culture and life. This Black Aesthetic encouraged the idea of Black separatism, and in trying to facilitate this, hoped to further strengthen black ideals, solidarity, and creativity.

In The Black Aesthetic (1971), Addison Gayle argues that Black artists should work exclusively on uplifting their identity while refusing to appease white folks. The Black Aesthetic works as a "corrective", where black people are not supposed to desire the "ranks of Norman Mailer or a William Styron". Black people are encouraged by Black artists who take their own Black identity, reshaping and redefining themselves for themselves by themselves via art as a medium. Hoyt Fuller defines The Black Aesthetic "in terms of the cultural experiences and tendencies expressed in artist' work" while another meaning of The Black Aesthetic comes from Ron Karenga, who argues for three main characteristics of The Black Aesthetic and Black art itself: functional, collective, and committed. Karenga says, "Black Art must expose the enemy, praise the people, and support the revolution". The notion "art for art's sake" is killed in the process, binding the Black Aesthetic to the revolutionary struggle, a struggle that is the reasoning behind reclaiming Black art in order to return to African culture and tradition for Black people. Under Karenga's definition of The Black Aesthetic, art that does not fight for the Black Revolution is not considered as art at all, and needs the vital context of social issues as well as an artistic value.

Among these definitions, the central theme that is the underlying connection of the Black Arts, Black Aesthetic, and Black Power movements is then this: the idea of group identity, which is defined by Black artists of organizations as well as their objectives.

The narrowed view of The Black Aesthetic, often described as Marxist by critics, brought upon conflicts of the Black Aesthetic and Black Arts Movement as a whole in areas that drove the focus of African culture; In The Black Arts Movement and Its Critics, David Lionel Smith argues in saying "The Black Aesthetic", one suggests a single principle, closed and prescriptive in which just really sustains the oppressiveness of defining race in one single identity. The search of finding the true "blackness" of Black people through art by the term creates obstacles in achieving a refocus and return to African culture. Smith compares the statement "The Black Aesthetic" to "Black Aesthetics", the latter leaving multiple, open, descriptive possibilities. The Black Aesthetic, particularly Karenga's definition, has also received additional critiques; Ishmael Reed, author of Neo-HooDoo Manifesto, argues for artistic freedom, ultimately against Karenga's idea of the Black Aesthetic, which Reed finds limiting and something he cannot ever sympathize with. The example Reed brings up is if a Black artist wants to paint black guerrillas, that is okay, but if the Black artist "does so only deference to Ron Karenga, something's wrong". The focus of blackness in the context of maleness was another critique raised with the Black Aesthetic. Pollard argues that the art made with the artistic and social values of the Black Aesthetic emphasizes the male talent of blackness, and it is uncertain whether the movement only includes women as an afterthought.

As there begins a change in the Black population, Trey Ellis points out other flaws in his essay "The New Black Aesthetic". Blackness in terms of cultural background can no longer be denied to appease or please white or black people. From mulattos to a "post-bourgeois movement driven by a second generation of middle class", blackness is not a singular identity as the phrase "The Black Aesthetic" forces it to be but rather multifaceted and vast.

BAM also turned to the religious tradition of voodoo in defining black aesthetics. James Baldwin was critical of both the black church and the Nation of Islam. He argued that Christianity had only been forced on black people to rationalize and justify slavery and colonization. Nation of Islam failed in its strong mission to separate itself and black people from white people, said Baldwin, especially looking at their culture of expensive suits and cars all the while demonizing white people. Voodoo then became an alternative to Christianity and Islam for BAM. The historical tradition of voodoo among enslaved Africans had been forgotten in favor of assimilation to the white, Christian identity. The turn to voodoo is therefore regarded as a pan-African reclaiming of the roots. The approximation to voodoo is maybe most clear in the poetry collection "Hoodoo Hollerin Bebop Ghosts" by Larry Neal and the novels "Neo-Hoo-Doo Manifesto" and "Mumbo Jumbo" by Ishmael Reed.

=== Major works ===
==== Black Art ====
Amiri Baraka's poem "Black Art" serves as one of his more controversial, poetically profound supplements to the Black Arts Movement. In this piece, Baraka merges politics with art, criticizing poems that are not useful to or adequately representative of the Black struggle. First published in 1966, a period particularly known for the Civil Rights Movement, the political aspect of this piece underscores the need for a concrete and artistic approach to the realistic nature involving racism and injustice. Serving as the recognized artistic component to and having roots in the Civil Rights Movement, the Black Arts Movement aims to grant a political voice to black artists (including poets, dramatists, writers, musicians, etc.). Playing a vital role in this movement, Baraka calls out what he considers to be unproductive and assimilatory actions shown by political leaders during the Civil Rights Movement. He describes prominent Black leaders as being "on the steps of the white house...kneeling between the sheriff's thighs negotiating coolly for his people." Baraka also presents issues of Eurocentric mentality, by referring to Elizabeth Taylor as a prototypical model in a society that influences perceptions of beauty, emphasizing its influence on individuals of white and black ancestry. Baraka aims his message toward the Black community, to coalesce African Americans into a unified movement, devoid of white influences. "Black Art" serves as a medium for expression meant to strengthen that solidarity and creativity, in terms of the Black Aesthetic. Baraka believes poems should "shoot...come at you, love what you are" and not succumb to mainstream desires.

He ties this approach into the emergence of hip-hop, which he paints as a movement that presents "live words...and live flesh and coursing blood." Baraka's cathartic structure and aggressive tone are comparable to the beginnings of hip-hop music, which created controversy in the realm of mainstream acceptance, because of its "authentic, un-distilled, unmediated forms of contemporary black urban music." Baraka believes that integration inherently takes away from the legitimacy of having a Black identity and Aesthetic in an anti-Black world. Through pure and unapologetic blackness, and with the absence of white influences, Baraka believes a black world can be achieved. Though hip-hop has been serving as a recognized salient musical form of the Black Aesthetic, a history of unproductive integration is seen across the spectrum of music, beginning with the emergence of a newly formed narrative in mainstream appeal in the 1950s. Much of Baraka's cynical disillusionment with unproductive integration can be drawn from the 1950s, a period of rock and roll, in which "record labels actively sought to have white artists "cover" songs that were popular on the rhythm-and-blues charts" originally performed by African-American artists. The problematic nature of unproductive integration is also exemplified by Run-DMC, an American hip-hop group founded in 1981, which became widely accepted after a calculated collaboration with the rock group Aerosmith on a remake of the latter's "Walk This Way" took place in 1986, evidently appealing to young white audiences. Hip-hop emerged as an evolving genre of music that continuously challenged mainstream acceptance, most notably with the development of rap in the 1990s. A significant and modern example of this is Ice Cube, a well-known American rapper, songwriter, and actor, who introduced the subgenre of hip-hop known as "gangsta rap", merged social consciousness and political expression with music. With the 1960s serving as a more blatantly racist period of time, Baraka notes the revolutionary nature of hip-hop, grounded in the unmodified expression through art. This method of expression in music parallels significantly with Baraka's ideals presented in "Black Art", focusing on poetry that is also productively and politically driven.

==== The Revolutionary Theatre ====
"The Revolutionary Theatre" is a 1965 essay by Baraka that was an important contribution to the Black Arts Movement, discussing the need for change through literature and theater arts. He says: "We will scream and cry, murder, run through the streets in agony, if it means some soul will be moved, moved to actual life understanding of what the world is, and what it ought to be." Baraka wrote his poetry, drama, fiction and essays in a way that would shock and awaken audiences to the political concerns of black Americans, which says much about what he was doing with this essay. It also did not seem coincidental to him that Malcolm X and John F. Kennedy had been assassinated within a few years because Baraka believed that every voice of change in America had been murdered, which led to the writing that would come out of the Black Arts Movement.

In his essay, Baraka says: "The Revolutionary Theatre is shaped by the world, and moves to reshape the world, using as its force the natural force and perpetual vibrations of the mind in the world. We are history and desire, what we are, and what any experience can make us."

With his thought-provoking ideals and references to a euro-centric society, he imposes the notion that black Americans should stray from a white aesthetic in order to find a black identity. In his essay, he says: "The popular white man's theatre like the popular white man's novel shows tired white lives, and the problems of eating white sugar, or else it herds bigcaboosed blondes onto huge stages in rhinestones and makes believe they are dancing or singing." This, having much to do with a white aesthetic, further proves what was popular in society and even what society had as an example of what everyone should aspire to be, like the "bigcaboosed blondes" that went "onto huge stages in rhinestones". Furthermore, these blondes made believe they were "dancing and singing" which Baraka seems to be implying that white people dancing is not what dancing is supposed to be at all. These allusions bring forth the question of where black Americans fit in the public eye. Baraka says: "We are preaching virtue and feeling, and a natural sense of the self in the world. All men live in the world, and the world ought to be a place for them to live." Baraka's essay challenges the idea that there is no space in politics or in society for black Americans to make a difference through different art forms that consist of, but are not limited to, poetry, song, dance, and art.

== Effects on society ==
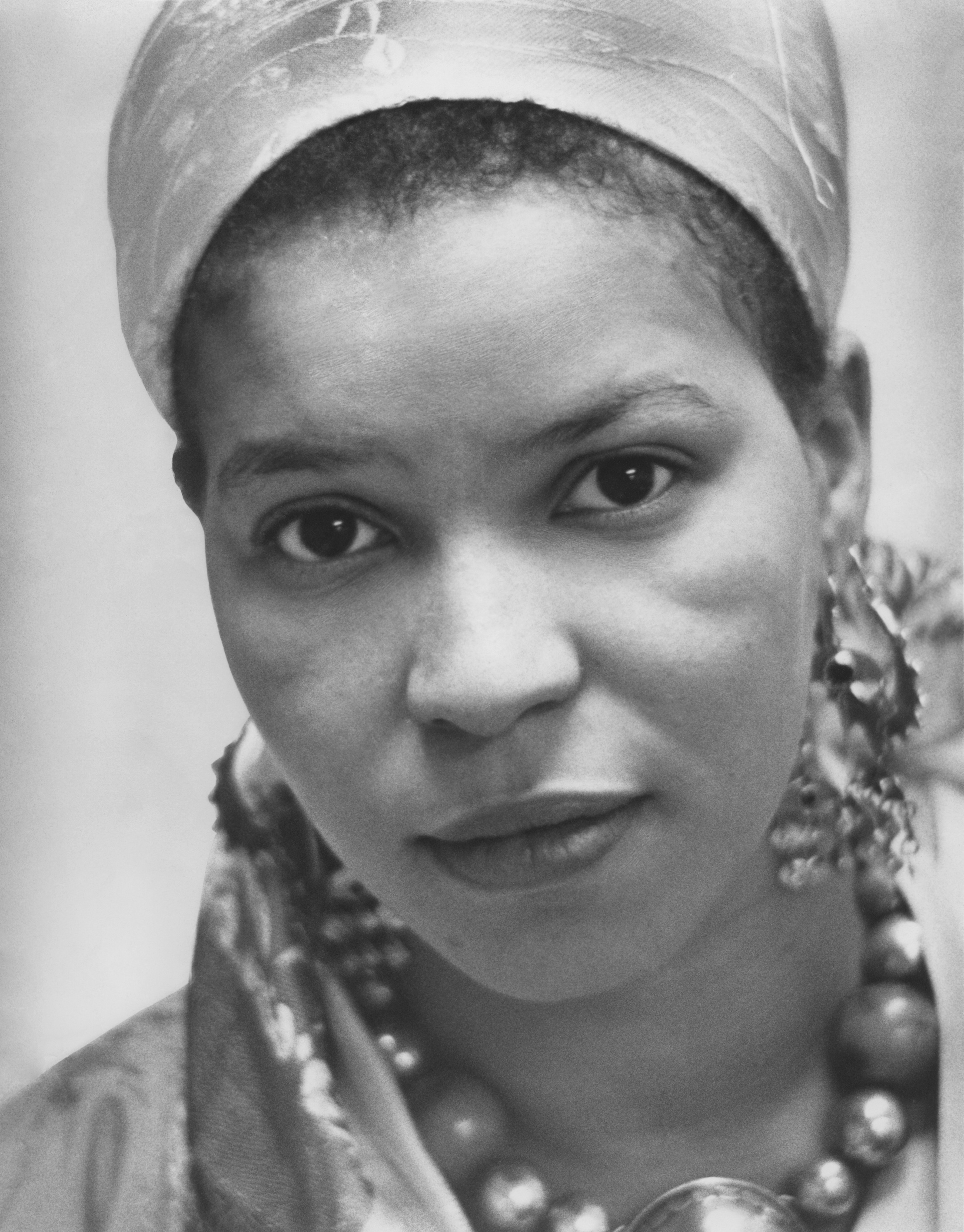
Ntozake Shange (1978), author of for colored girls who have considered suicide / when the rainbow is enuf

According to the Academy of American Poets, "many writers—Native Americans, Latinos/as, gays and lesbians, and younger generations of African Americans have acknowledged their debt to the Black Arts Movement." The movement lasted for about a decade, through the mid-1960s and into the 1970s. This was a period of controversy and change in the world of literature. One major change came through in the portrayal of new ethnic voices in the United States. English-language literature, prior to the Black Arts Movement, was dominated by white authors.

African Americans became a greater presence not only in the field of literature but in all areas of the arts. Theater groups, poetry performances, music and dance were central to the movement. Through different forms of media, African Americans were able to educate others about the expression of cultural differences and viewpoints. In particular, black poetry readings allowed African Americans to use vernacular dialogues. This was shown in the Harlem Writers Guild, which included black writers such as Maya Angelou and Rosa Guy. These performances were used to express political slogans and as a tool for organization. Theater performances also were used to convey community issues and organizations. The theaters, as well as cultural centers, were based throughout America and were used for community meetings, study groups and film screenings. Newspapers were a major tool in spreading the Black Arts Movement. In 1964, Black Dialogue was published, making it the first major Arts movement publication.

The Black Arts Movement, although short, is essential to the history of the United States. It spurred political activism and use of speech throughout every African-American community. It allowed African Americans the chance to express their voices in the mass media as well as become involved in communities.

It can be argued that "the Black Arts movement produced some of the most exciting poetry, drama, dance, music, visual art, and fiction of the post-World War II United States" and that many important "post-Black artists" such as Toni Morrison, Ntozake Shange, Alice Walker, and August Wilson were shaped by the movement.

The Black Arts Movement also provided incentives for public funding of the arts and increased public support of various arts initiatives.

=== Legacy ===
The movement has been seen as one of the most important times in African-American literature. It inspired black people to establish their own publishing houses, magazines, journals and art institutions. It led to the creation of African-American Studies programs within universities. Some claim that the movement was triggered by the assassination of Malcolm X, but its roots predate that event. Among the well-known writers who were involved with the movement are Nikki Giovanni, Sonia Sanchez, Maya Angelou, Hoyt W. Fuller, and Rosa Guy. Although not strictly part of the Movement, other notable African American writers such as Toni Morrison, Jay Wright, and Ishmael Reed share some of its artistic and thematic concerns. Although Reed is neither a movement apologist nor advocate, he said:

I think what Black Arts did was inspire a whole lot of Black people to write. Moreover, there would be no multiculturalism movement without Black Arts. Latinos, Asian Americans, and others all say they began writing as a result of the example of the 1960s. Blacks gave the example that you don't have to assimilate. You could do your own thing, get into your own background, your own history, your own tradition and your own culture. I think the challenge is for cultural sovereignty and Black Arts struck a blow for that.

BAM influenced the world of literature with the portrayal of different ethnic voices. Before the movement, the literary canon lacked diversity, and the ability to express ideas from the point of view of racial and ethnic minorities, which was not valued by the mainstream at the time. BAM also spurred experimentalism in Black letters.

=== Influence ===
Theater groups, poetry performances, music and dance were centered on this movement, and therefore African Americans gained social and historical recognition in the area of literature and arts. Due to the agency and credibility given, African Americans were also able to educate others through different types of expressions and media outlets about cultural differences. The most common form of teaching was through poetry reading. African-American performances were used for their own political advertisement, organization, and community issues. The Black Arts Movement was spread by the use of newspaper advertisements. The first major arts movement publication was in 1964.

"No one was more competent in [the] combination of the experimental and the vernacular than Amiri Baraka, whose volume Black Magic Poetry 1961–1967 (1969) is one of the finest products of the African-American creative energies of the 1960s."

== Notable individuals ==
- Amiri Baraka (formerly LeRoi Jones)
- Larry Neal
- Nikki Giovanni
- Maya Angelou
- Gwendolyn Brooks
- Haki R. Madhubuti (formerly Don Lee)
- Sun Ra
- Audre Lorde
- James Baldwin
- Hoyt W. Fuller
- Ishmael Reed
- Rosa Guy
- Dudley Randall
- Ed Bullins
- David Henderson
- Henry Dumas
- Sonia Sanchez
- Faith Ringgold
- Ming Smith
- Betye Saar
- Cheryl Clarke
- John Henrik Clarke
- Jayne Cortez
- Don Evans
- Mari Evans
- Etheridge Knight
- Sarah Webster Fabio
- Wanda Coleman
- Barbara Ann Teer
- Askia M. Touré
- Marvin X
- Ossie Davis
- June Jordan
- Sarah E. Wright
- Amina Baraka (formerly Sylvia Robinson)
- Ellis Haizlip
- David Hammons
- Eugene "Eda" Wade
- Garrett Morris

== Notable organizations ==
- AfriCOBRA
- Black Academy of Arts and Letters
- Black Artists Group
- Black Arts Repertory Theatre School
- Black Dialogue
- Black Emergency Cultural Coalition
- BlackMan's Art Gallery
- Broadside Press
- Brockman Gallery
- Freedomways
- Gallery 32
- Harlem Writers Guild
- Just Above Midtown
- National Black Theatre
- Negro Digest
- Organization of Black American Culture
- Soul Book
- Soul!
- The Black Scholar
- The Crusader
- The Liberator
- Uptown Writers Movement
- Where We At

== See also ==
- African-American art
- African American culture
- Africanfuturism
- Afrofuturism
- Black pride
- Négritude
- Progressive soul

== Works cited ==
- Avilez, GerShun. Radical Aesthetics and Modern Black Nationalism. Urbana: University of Illinois Press, 2016.
- Baraka, Amiri. The LeRoi Jones/Amiri Baraka Reader. Edited by William J. Harris. New York: Basic Books, 2009.
- Bracey, John H., Sonia Sanchez, and James Smethurst, eds. SOS – Calling All Black People: A Black Arts Movement Reader. University of Massachusetts Press, 2014.
- Clarke, Cheryl. "After Mecca": Women Poets and the Black Arts Movement. New Brunswick, N.J.: Rutgers University Press, 2005.
- Crawford, Margo Natalie. Black Post-Blackness: The Black Arts Movement and Twenty-First-Century Aesthetics. Urbana, Ill.: University of Illinois Press, 2017.
- Fenderson, Jonathan. Building the Black Arts Movement: Hoyt Fuller and the Cultural Politics of the 1960s. Urbana, Ill.: University of Illinois Press, 2019.
- Lubiano, Wahneema. "Black Nationalism and Black Common Sense: Policing Ourselves and Others." In The House That Race Built: Black Americans, U.S. Terrain, edited by Wahneema Lubiano, 232–52. New York: Pantheon Books, 1997.
- Salaam, Kalamu ya. "Black Arts Movement". In The Oxford Companion to African American Literature, edited by William L. Andrews, Frances Smith Foster, and Trudier Harris, 70–74. New York: Oxford University Press, 1997.
- Smethurst, James Edward. The Black Arts Movement: Literary Nationalism in the 1960s and 1970s. Chapel Hill: University of North Carolina Press, 2005.
