= Askia M. Touré =

American poet

Askia Muhammad Touré
- Born: Rolland Snellings; October 13, 1938 (age 88); Raleigh, North Carolina, U.S.
- Occupation: Poet

Academic work
- Institutions: San Francisco State University

Askia Muhammad Touré (né Rolland Snellings; born October 13, 1938, in Raleigh, North Carolina) is an African-American poet, essayist, political editor, educator, and leading voice of the Black Arts Movement. Toure helped to define a new generation of black consciousness by creating a triumphal identity for the purpose of uplifting the African heritage beyond the oppressive ideas that dominated the time.

== Life ==
Born Roland Snellings, on October 13, 1938, in Raleigh, North Carolina, to Clifford R. and Nancy (Bullock) Snelling, he lived under the care of his paternal grandmother in La Grange, Georgia until he was six years old. Although he later joined his family in Dayton, Ohio, his frequent trips to Georgia and North Carolina would be credited with the foundation for his early poetic imagery.

He attended public school and graduated from Dayton's Roosevelt High School in 1956. During this time he had begun spending much of his time singing "Doo Wop" at local nightclubs, inspiring a desire to pursue a career in the music industry. However, he forfeited this path when he joined the United States Air Force, serving from 1956 to 1959.

With his military service in his wake, he moved to New York City in order to study visual arts at the Art Students League from 1960 to 1962. This new path allowed him to pursue a career as an illustrator for Umbra Magazine. During this time Touré was introduced to several prominent poets, authors, and activist affiliated with the magazine. It was with these influences that his poetry developed and matured, carrying the styles of W. E. B. Du Bois, William Butler Yeats, Pablo Neruda, Langston Hughes, as well as the rhythm and tones found in popular jazz music.

From 1963 to 1965, he served on the editorial board of Black America,the "literary arm of the black nationalist Revolutionary Action Movement (RAM). He also served on the staff of Liberator Magazine and was the associate editor for Black Dialogue. From this publication he furthered his career by becoming the editor-and-chief for the Journal of Black Poetry (now Kitabu Cha Juai) where his voice worked to redefine the black identity and strengthen the abolishment of black oppression.

With the assassination of Malcolm X, Touré joined forces with influential scholar Larry Neal to found the newspaper Afro World and take the streets of Harlem by storm by cultivating an event which led to the formation/creation of Harlem's Black Arts School.He participated in the Fulton Art Fair in Brooklyn, in 1961 and 1962, and the Black Arts Movement.

In 1961, he protested the assassination of Patrice Lumumba, at the United Nations, with Amiri Baraka, Calvin Hicks, Aishah Rahman, Max Roach, Abbey Lincoln, Alex Prempe, Mae Mallory, and Maya Angelou.

As an adult, Touré shocked readers by publishing a letter denouncing Amiri Baraka's anti-white teaching which he claimed neglected to promote the positive images involving African American culture. In 1967, he joined the faculty at San Francisco State University with Nathan Hare where he taught the country's first Africana studies program. It was during this time in San Francisco that his interest in the National of Islam grew. This interest led to his conversion to Islam in 1970.

== Family life ==
Married: Dona Humphrey, 1966 (divorced); 1 son: Tariq Abdullah bin Touré Married: Helen Morton Hobbs (aka Halima) 1970 (divorced); 1 son: Jamil Abdus-Salam bin Touré Married: Agila

He resides and teaches in Boston, Massachusetts. He was a writer-in-residence in Boston at the now defunct Ogunaaike Gallery in Boston's South End. He was working on a film about the Black Arts Movement.

He is a former editor of the Journal of Black Poetry, Black Dialogue and Black Star.

== Awards ==
- 1952: Modern Poetry Association Award
- 1969: Columbia University Creative Writing Grant
- 1989: American Book Award
- 1996: Gwendolyn Brooks Lifetime Achievement Award from the Gwendolyn Brooks Institute like in Chicago, Illinois
- 2000: Stephen E. Henderson Poetry Award for Dawnsong

== Works ==
- African Affirmations: Songs for Patriots: New Poems, 1994 to 2004. Africa World Press. 2007. ISBN 978-1-59221-554-6.
- Dawnsong!: The Epic Memory of Askia Touré. Third World Press. 1999. ISBN 978-0-88378-209-5.
- From the Pyramids to the Projects: Poems of Genocide & Resistance!. Africa World Press. 1990. ISBN 978-0-86543-135-5.
- Juju: Magic Songs for the Black Nation. Third World Press. 1972.
- Songhai. Songhai Press. 1972.

=== Anthologies ===
- Keith Gilyard, ed. (1997). "Azuri". Spirit & Flame: An Anthology of Contemporary African American Poetry. Syracuse University Press. ISBN 978-0-8156-2731-9.
