= Jean Young =

Jean Young may refer to:

- Jean Childs Young (1933–1994), educator and advocate for equal access to education in the United States
- Jean Smith Young (born 1942), American psychiatrist, writer, and civil rights activist
