= Callaloo (literary magazine) =

Academic journal, established in 1976

Callaloo A Journal of African Diaspora Arts and Letters
- Discipline: African-American literature
- Language: English
- Edited by: Charles Henry Rowell

Publication details
- History: 1976–present
- Publisher: Johns Hopkins University Press
- Frequency: Quarterly

Standard abbreviations
- ISO 4: Callaloo

Indexing
- ISSN: 0161-2492 (print); 1080-6512 (web)
- JSTOR: callaloo
- OCLC no.: 41669989

Links
- Journal homepage

Callaloo, A Journal of African Diaspora Arts and Letters, is a quarterly literary magazine established in 1976 by Charles H. Rowell, who remains its editor-in-chief. It contains creative writing, visual art, and critical texts about literature and culture of the African diaspora, and is the longest continuously running African-American literary magazine.

Notable writers published in Callaloo include Ernest Gaines, Rita Dove, Yusef Komunyakaa, Octavia Butler, Alice Walker, Lucille Clifton, Edwidge Danticat, Thomas Glave, Samuel Delany, and John Edgar Wideman. Callaloo is well known for connecting Black artists from different cultures and sponsoring upcoming writers. It has been published by the Johns Hopkins University Press since 1986 and headquartered at Texas A&M since 2001.

== History ==
Charles H. Rowell initially conceived the idea for Callaloo in 1974 out of necessity for a Black South forum. Rowell was first inspired to create a Black South forum when writing an article on a recent interview he had with Sterling Brown, a poet and critic at Howard University. Rowell was impressed by all that Brown had done to preserve, promote, and celebrate African-American culture and literature. Wanting to further advance the sphere of African-American literature, particularly in the South, Rowell sought to create an independent venue for Black writers in the South. In the wake of the Black Arts Movement, which according to Rowell pushed a narrow political ideology associated with northern urban communities, there was a severe lack of Black Southern literature. In addition, the presence of systemic discrimination against Black people in the South created a barrier from Black writers works being published. Rowell sought to fix this by creating a "Black South forum" to allow Black writers in the South to have their voices heard. With the help of colleagues, students, and fundraising at Southern University, Callaloo's first issue was published in 1976 in Baton Rouge, Louisiana, as a Black South literacy forum.

After Callaloo's initial publication in 1976, it quickly grew beyond the initial concept of it being a Black Southern forum. In 1977, Rowell moved to the University of Kentucky, where he published Callaloo's second issue from his academic office. After the journal gained a university affiliation, it lost two of its original three editors – Tom Dent and Jerry Ward – which, according to Margo Natalie Crawford, is when the journal blossomed into what it is now: an acclaimed journal for black diasporic art and literature. In its early years, Callaloo included short stories from Rita Dove, a novel by Nathaniel Mackey, and poetry by Melvin Dixon, Brenda Marie Osbey, Gerald Barrax, and Jay Wright. In 1986, Charles Rowell moved to the University of Virginia, which is when Johns Hopkins University began publishing the magazine. At the University of Virginia, Rowell and his staff sought to extend readership not only nationally, but also internationally. Callaloo was no longer just for Black writers in the South; it evolved into its own epicenter to promote Black voices and culture across the African diaspora. In order to accomplish this task, Rowell and his staff traveled to various Universities and libraries to hold international readings and workshops to bring together writers and artists from various backgrounds across the African diaspora. According to Rowell, these initiatives proved successful, and after his move to Texas A&M University, Rowell and his team continued to receive ample support from the university to sponsor workshops and competitions to bring black artists together from a variety of backgrounds and cultures. Through writing competitions, developing writers and their potential were recognized; as a result, many upcoming writers were sponsored by the university, and received help with their first publications, some of which were even included in Callaloo, such as the Pulitzer Prize-winning poet Natasha Trethewey.

At Texas A&M University, Rowell worked on a project to investigate histories of African descent in different areas of the Caribbean and South and Central America. The region's history, life, literature, and culture were of particular interest to the project. According to Carrol F. Coates, who has worked with Callaloo to maintain the presence of Haitian literature in the journal, Rowell would make one or more visits to each Caribbean island in order to meet and interview writers of African descent and gather visual impressions along with manuscripts. As a result, Callaloo, over its history, has published various special issues about Brazil, Haiti, Cuba, Surinam, and Mexico. Prominent writers from these areas have also been published, including Maryse Condé, Nicolas Guillén, Derek Walcott, and Nancy Morejón. The journal has also represented many languages from the Caribbean, and South and Central America, including English, Spanish, French, Haitian Kreyol, Portuguese, and Dutch.

== Influence and significance ==
Callaloo's impact has been its ability to bring the African Diaspora together in one location, both through text, and through literary and cultural activities. It is described as serving as the arbiter for intercultural communication. Margo Natalie Crawford's 2017 book Black Post-Blackness examines the practice of diaspora in the Callaloo: it is a mixing and remixing of different frames of mind into ideas that are entirely new, which work to progress the knowledge of African Diaspora literature. The journal's name reflects this, as "Callaloo" is a type of Jamaican dish that mixes various vegetables into one soup. In Callaloo's 30th-celebration issue, Charles Rowell describes the significance and uniqueness of the journal:

The forum I founded and first published in 1976 is today the only American literary journal to organize and coordinate literary and cultural activities throughout the African Diaspora. [...] Perhaps, and most importantly, the journal, from its beginning in 1976, continues to be the sole North American cultural enterprise that not only identifies and encourages new African-American writers, but also publishes them right along with established writers.

=== Callaloo and the Black Arts Movement ===
In the wake of the Black Arts Movement, Callaloo helped redefine the Black aesthetic. Rowell wanted a journal that was removed from what he saw as a prescriptive and limited Black aesthetic that was overly intertwined with the North and the Black Arts Movement. Rowell sees the innovation in post-Black Arts Movement artists as much more representative of his view of the Black aesthetic compared to what he saw as the "programmatic nature" of the Black Arts Movement. Callaloo, to Rowell and his supporters, represents the spirit of Black aesthetics. Margo Natalie Crawford describes the aesthetic in Callaloo as "the power of becoming", which has done a great deal to change conceptions about the Black aesthetics following the Black Arts Movement.

== Awards ==
In addition to receiving grants of support from agencies such as the Lannan Foundation and the National Endowment for the Arts, the magazine has garnered a number of honors, including the best special issue of a journal from the Council of Editors of Learned Journals for "The Haitian Issues" in 1992 (volume 15.2 & 3: Haiti: the Literature and Culture Parts I & II); an honorable mention for the "Best Special Issue of a Journal" in 2001 from the Professional/Scholarly Publishing Division of the American Association (volume 24.1: The Confederate Flag Controversy: A Special Section); and recognition for the Winter 2002 issue from the Council of Editors of Learned Journals as one of the best special issues of that year (volume 25.1: Jazz Poetics). Callaloo also ranked 13th in Every Writer's Resource's Top 50 Literary Magazines in 2018.

== Abstracting and indexing ==
Callaloo is abstracted and indexed in the following bibliographic databases:

- Academic Search Premier
- Arts and Humanities Citation Index
- Gender Studies Database
- Humanities Abstracts
- IBZ Online
- Index Islamicus
- International Bibliography of Art
- International Bibliography of Theatre & Dance
- MLA - Modern Language Association Database
- Periodicals Index Online
- Public Affairs Index
- Scopus

According to Scopus, Callaloo has a 2018 CiteScore of 0.04, ranking 479/736 in the category "Literature and Literary Theory".

== See also ==
- List of literary magazines
- African-American literature
- African-American culture
