= N. H. Pritchard =

American poet (1939–1996)

- Born: Norman Henry Pritchard; October 22, 1939; New York City, New York
- Died: February 8, 1996 (aged 56); Eastern Pennsylvania, U.S.
- Education: NYU, Columbia
- Occupations: poet, artist

Norman Henry Pritchard (October 22, 1939 – February 8, 1996), was an American poet. He was a member of the Umbra poets, a collective of Black writers in Manhattan's Lower East Side founded in 1962. Pritchard's avant-garde poetry often includes unconventional typography and spacing, as in "Harbour," or lack sentences entirely, as in " " ".

== Biography ==
Pritchard was born in New York City to a Jamaican father and Trinidadian mother; he was raised in Harlem and the Crown Heights neighborhood of Brooklyn.

He studied for a B.A. degree at New York University, where he was president of his campus Fine Arts Society and an active contributor to his college's literary magazine. Pritchard did graduate work at Columbia University, taught briefly at the New School for Social Research, and was a poet-in-residence at Friends Seminary.

Prior to his time with the Umbra Poetry Workshop, Pritchard was acquainted or became friends with many artists, writers, and poets in Greenwich Village and the Lower East Side, including Philip Guston, Bill Komodore, Reuben Kadish, Franz Kline, Robert Motherwell, Barnett Newman, Willem de Kooning, Mark Rothko, Jack Kerouac, Allen Ginsberg, Frank O'Hara, Paul Blackburn, and many others who would frequently meet at the Cedar Tavern near NYU.

During the years he was a member of the Umbra poets, Pritchard's work appeared in magazines and journals such as Athanor, the East Village Other, Gathering, Liberator, Negro Digest, Poetry Northwest, Sail, and Season.

During his lifetime, Pritchard's poetry was published in two single-author volumes: The Matrix: Poems, 1960-1970 (Doubleday, 1970) and Eecchhooeess (New York University Press, 1971). His poetry was also included in compilations and anthologies including New Jazz Poet (1967), The New Black Poetry (1969), In a Time of Revolution: Poems from Our Third World (1969), and Natural Process (1971), edited by Ted Wilentz and Tom Weatherly.

Pritchard stopped publishing in the early 1970s, and before his early death from cancer was residing in eastern Pennsylvania.

== Critical reception ==
Though Pritchard's work received recognition during the late 1960s and early 1970s, The Matrix and Eecchhooeess did not see significant success; as Richard Kostelanetz states, "Only one one-man collection of visual poetry, for instance, has ever been commercially published in the United States, even though 'concrete' is reportedly 'faddish'; and since that single book, N. H. Pritchard's The Matrix (1970), was neither reviewed nor touted, it seemed unlikely that any others would ever appear—another example of how the rule of precedent in literary commerce produces de facto censorship."

From the late 1970s through the 1980s Pritchard received occasional acknowledgment in scholarship on the Umbra poets, including by Lorenzo Thomas in Callaloo (1978), and was mentioned by peers such as Ishmael Reed, but he was not widely considered in scholarship on either concrete poetry or African-American poetry.

In 1992, Kevin Young produced the first serious engagement with Pritchard's work in many years in a "groundbreaking" essay for the Harvard Library Bulletin, offering theories as to why Pritchard's work might have fallen out of favor or proven inconvenient as "far too abstract for a largely white avant-garde trying to simplify and internationalize the poem by making it graphic" and "seem[ing] to fall outside the Black Aesthetic's vernacular and political aims." A year after Pritchard's death in 1996, Aldon Lynn Nielsen took up the question of his poetry and disappearance in Black Chant: Languages of African-American Postmodernism, also quoting Young, and in 2004 Charles Bernstein discussed Pritchard in the edited collection Dark Horses: Poets on Lost Poems.

Pritchard's work was out of print for a number of years until the mid-2000s, when Craig Dworkin scanned and uploaded copies of The Matrix and Eecchhooeess to the Eclipse Archive; scholars began referencing these "editions" when discussing Pritchard's work.

In 2014, Anthony Reed included a chapter on Pritchard, Terrance Hayes, and M. NourbeSe Philip in his work Freedom Time: The Poetics and Politics of Black Experimental Writing (JHU Press); the book received the MLA's William Sanders Scarborough Prize. In 2020, Craig Dworkin included a chapter on Pritchard in his Radium of the Word: A Poetics of Materiality (Chicago).

In 2021, Ugly Duckling Presse and Primary Information republished The Matrix and Adam Pendleton's DABA Press republished Eecchhooeess.

Pritchard's work was featured in the 2022 Whitney Biennial, "Quiet as It’s Kept"; the Biennial also used an inverted parentheses from one of Pritchard's poems as a symbol for the show. Coverage of the Biennial led to the first mention of Pritchard in the New York Times since 1974.
