= Jay Wright (poet) =

American poet (born 1934)

- Born: May 25, 1934 (age 92); Albuquerque, New Mexico
- Spouse: Lois Wright
- Writing career
- Language: English
- Genre: Poetry
- Notable works: Dimensions of History, The Double Invention of Komo, Explications/Interpretations, Transfigurations
- Notable awards: 1986 MacArthur Fellowship, 1996 Fellowship of the Academy of American Poets, 2005 Bollingen Prize in Poetry, 2006 American Book Award Lifetime Achievement Award from the Before Columbus Foundation.

Jay L. Wright (born May 25, 1934) is an American poet, playwright, and essayist. Born in Albuquerque, New Mexico, he lives in Bradford, Vermont. Although his work is not as widely known as other American poets of his generation, it has received considerable critical acclaim, with some comparing Wright's poetry to the work of Walt Whitman, T. S. Eliot and Hart Crane. Others associate Wright with the African-American poets Robert Hayden and Melvin B. Tolson, due to his complexity of theme and language, as well as his work's utilization and transformation of the Western literary heritage. Wright's work is representative of what the Guyanese-British writer Wilson Harris has termed the "cross-cultural imagination", inasmuch as it incorporates elements of African, European, Native American and Latin American cultures. Following his receiving the Bollingen Prize in Poetry in 2005, Wright is recognized as one of the principal contributors to poetry in the early 21st century. Five of Wright's books were included by Harold Bloom in his list of works constituting the Western Canon, and Dante Micheaux has called Wright "unequivocally, the greatest living American poet"."

== Life and education ==
Wright's family origins are emblematic of the multi-cultural nature of his literary work. His mother, Leona Dailey, was born in Virginia and had both African and Native American ancestry, while his father, George Murphy, or Mercer Murphy Wright, as he was also known, claimed African, Cherokee and Irish roots. Murphy held diverse blue-collar jobs, which included working construction, driving a jitney, and working as a handyman. However, Wright grew up in foster care in Albuquerque, and moved to San Pedro, California, in his teens to live with his father.

When he was in high school, Wright began to play bass, and when Neil Arditi met him in the late 1990s, Wright was still performing as a jazz bassist. Jazz music informs Wright's work and aesthetic in various ways, in poems such as "Wednesday Night Prayer Meeting", "Billie's Blues", and "Twenty-Two Tremblings of the Postulant". The poet's experience as a jazz bassist is referenced in the poem "The End of an Ethnic Dream": "Cigarettes in my mouth / to puncture blisters in my brain. / My bass a fine piece of furniture. / My fingers soft, too soft to rattle / rafters in second-rate halls."

As a young man, Wright played minor-league baseball, appearing in 76 games over two seasons (1953–1954) with the Mexicali Eagles of the Arizona-Texas League and the Fresno Cardinals of the California League. In 1954, Wright abandoned his baseball career to serve in the U.S. Army Medical Corps in Germany until 1957; in this period he was able to travel in many countries in Europe.

Upon returning from Europe, Wright studied comparative literature at the University of California, Berkeley, and Rutgers University. He received his BA from Berkeley in 1961, and his MA from Rutgers in 1967. In 1964, he taught English and medieval history for a year at the Butler Institute in Guadalajara, Mexico. After this experience, he returned to Rutgers to finish his MA and begin work on a PhD, but left before completing his doctoral degree.

As a student at Rutgers, Wright lived in Harlem, where he met African-American writers associated with the Black Arts Movement (BAM), such as Larry Neal, LeRoi Jones, and Henry Dumas. Wright would later write the introduction to Dumas' posthumously published collection of poetry, Play Ebony, Play Ivory: Poetry. Wright has been described as a member of the Black Arts Movement, although in a monograph dedicated to the movement, only Wright's first book, The Homecoming Singer, is discussed in connection with the group. Indeed, Wright's poem "Idiotic and Politic", from The Homecoming Singer, has been read as "a virtual declaration of independence from BAM," addressed directly to LeRoi Jones (later Amiri Baraka), the founder of the Black Arts Movement.

Over the years Wright has been poet in residence at Yale University as well as the University of Dundee and historically black colleges and universities such as Talladega College, Tougaloo College, and Texas Southern University.

== Poetry ==
Wright's first publication was a 22-page chapbook entitled Death as History, which contained 15 poems, published in 1967 by Poets Press. Although this collection has never been republished, some of the poems were included in Wright's first full-length book, The Homecoming Singer. Wright himself has disowned the book in print, saying that it was not intended as a unified work, but merely as "a group of poems selected from those [he] had on hand". At the time the book was published, Wright was employed on a tour of black schools in the South for the Woodrow Wilson-National Endowment of the Arts program, and Carolyn Kizer thought he ought to have a book of poems; therefore, she helped him publish the book with Diane DiPrima of Poets Press. In the poems that were not republished in The Homecoming Singer, the language, imagery and sensibility have been described as romantic and conventional in nature. In other poems from this collection, however, the tone, style and subject matter are not dissimilar to those found in poems published many years later as regards their concern for religious experience and the exploration of African myth and religion.

In 1971, Wright's first full-length collection of poetry, The Homecoming Singer, was published by Corinth Press. This book included poems including "The Homecoming Singer", "The End of an Ethnic Dream", and "An Invitation to Madison County". In this book, Wright "attempts to bridge past and present and meditates on feelings of exclusion from society or personal identity using geographical settings as backdrops for the autobiographical persona's spiritual, emotional, and intellectual growth." The poem that opens the volume, "Wednesday Night Prayer Meeting", has a narrator who is mostly detached from the scene described in the poem and then becomes ironically part of "the uncertain, inconclusive encounter between man and God in a Black church.". The poem suggests an ambiguous, questioning attitude towards traditional religion that is revealed in the congregants' Africanization of Christianity: "They have closed their night / with what certainty they could, / unwilling to change their freedom for a god." Critical reception of The Homecoming Singer was positive, and Wright was immediately recognized as a major voice. The New York Times hailed it as "a tense and memorable collection", in which Wright "is making his way among troubled alternatives", in search of an independent black voice. However, in contrast to Wright's later work, the themes of this book have been described as "conventional".

While some critics argue for a change of direction in Wright's work after Death as History and The Homecoming Singer (and some parts of Soothsayers and Omens), others find instead continuity and unity in the poet's work. Darryl Pinckney has argued that Wright's earlier poetry is more closely aligned with "the rebellious mood of the Sixties", referring in particular to the poems "Death as History" and "A Plea for the Politic Man". In his review of the volume Selected Poems of Jay Wright, poet Robert B. Shaw also contrasts the earlier volumes with the poet's later work, saying that one may "accept (and enjoy)" the earlier poems "with fewer questions", in contrast to the esoteric difficulty and rigor of the later poems. Charles H. Rowell associates the poems in The Homecoming Singer and in the second section of Soothsayers and Omens with confessional poetry in its focus on personal, autobiographical experience in contrast to the later poetry, which he characterizes as less immediately personal and grounded more in books and scholarship than in lived experience.

However, in discussing Wright's first five volumes of poetry, from Death as History to The Double Invention of Komo, Gerald Barrax sees a thematic and technical unity, describing these books as "so remarkably unified and consistent in subject, theme, tone, and technique that they might all constitute a single work." Indeed, Wright himself has suggested that his books up to Explications/Interpretations (excluding the disowned chapbook Death as History) constitute a unified, ordered series, "a dramatic process, with all its tensions and resolutions." Furthermore, the back cover copy of 2007's The Guide Signs: Book One and Book Two suggests that that volume, together with the eight volumes brought together in Transfigurations: Collected Poems, should be read as a single work.

== Awards ==
- 1986: John D. and Catherine T. MacArthur Foundation (or "Genius") Fellowship
- 1996: Fellowship of the Academy of American Poets
- 2001: L. L. Winship/PEN New England Award, Transfigurations: Collected Poems
- 2005: Bollingen Prize in Poetry, becoming the first African-American writer to be so honored
- 2006: American Book Award Lifetime Achievement Award from the Before Columbus Foundation

== Bibliography ==
=== Poetry ===
- Death as History. New York: Poets Press. 1967
- The Homecoming Singer. New York: Corinth Books. 1971
- Soothsayers and Omens. Seven Woods Press. 1976. ISBN 978-0-913282-10-6.
- Dimensions of History. Kayak. 1976. ISBN 0877110638
- The Double Invention of Komo. University of Texas Press. 1980
- Explications/Interpretations. University of Virginia. 1984
- Selected Poems of Jay Wright. Robert B. Stepto (ed.) New Jersey: Princeton University Press. 1987. ISBN 0691014353
- Elaine's Book. University of Virginia Press. 1988. ISBN 0813912016
- Boleros. Princeton University Press. 1991
- Transfigurations: Collected Poems. Baton Rouge: Louisiana State University Press. 2000. ISBN 978-0-8071-2630-1.
- Music's Mask and Measure. Chicago: Flood Editions. 2007. ISBN 0-9787467-3-2
- The Guide Signs: Book One and Book Two. Baton Rouge: Louisiana State University Press. 2007. ISBN 978-0-8071-3265-4.
- Polynomials and pollen: parables, proverbs, paradigms, and praise for Lois. Champaign & London: Dalkey Archive Press. 2008. ISBN 978-1-56478-499-5.
- The Presentable Art of Reading Absence. Champaign & London: Dalkey Archive Press. 2008. ISBN 978-1-56478-498-8.
- Disorientations: Groundings. Chicago: Flood Editions. 2013. ISBN 978-0-9838893-4-2.
- The Prime Anniversary. Chicago: Flood Editions. 2019. ISBN 978-0-9981695-8-3
- Thirteen Quintets for Lois. Chicago: Flood Editions. 2021. ISBN 9781733273473
- Postage Stamps. Chicago: Flood Editions. 2023. ISBN 9798985787429
- Párados. Chicago: Flood Editions. 2026. ISBN 9798991889414

=== Plays ===
- Balloons: A Comedy in One Act. Baker's Plays, 1968
- Wright, Jay (1983). "Love's Equations". Callaloo (19): 39–75. doi:10.2307/2930931. JSTOR 2930931.
- Wright, Jay (1987). "Daughters of the Water". Callaloo (31): 215–281. doi:10.2307/2930746. JSTOR 2930746.
- Wright, Jay (1991). "The Delights of Memory, II: Doss". Callaloo. 14 (1): 157–180. doi:10.2307/2931448. JSTOR 2931448.
- Wright, Jay (2006). "Axiomatic". Obsidian. 7 (2): 19–30. JSTOR 44489185.
- The Geometry of Rhythm, in The Prime Anniversary. Chicago: Flood Editions. 2019. ISBN 978-0-9981695-8-3
- The Dramatic Radiance of Number: Selected Plays of Jay Wright. Vol. 1. Berkeley: Kenning Editions. 2022. ISBN 978-1734317688.
- Figurations and Dedications: Selected Plays of Jay Wright. Vol. 2. Berkeley: Kenning Editions. 2022. ISBN 978-1734317695.

=== Prose ===
- "Introduction" in Dumas, Henry. Play Ebony: Play Ivory. Random House. 1974.
- Wright, Jay (1987). "Desire's Design, Vision's Resonance: Black Poetry's Ritual and Historical Voice". Callaloo (30): 13–28. doi:10.2307/2930633. JSTOR 2930633.
- Soul and Substance: A Poet's Examination Papers. Princeton: Princeton University Press. 2023. ISBN 978-0691245966.

=== Anthologies ===
- David Lehman, ed. (2006). The Oxford Book of American Poetry. Oxford University Press. ISBN 978-0-19-516251-6.
- J. D. McClatchy, ed. (2003). The Vintage Book of Contemporary American Poetry. Vintage Books. ISBN 978-1-4000-3093-4.
