= Eve Sandler =

American artist

- Born: Harlem, U.S.
- Occupations: Painter, filmmaker, and multi-media artist
- Relatives: Kathe Sandler (sister)

Eve Sandler is an American painter, filmmaker, and multi-media artist in the style of Abstract Expressionism. Sandler, born in Harlem, is the daughter of Harlem-based painter Alvin Sandler and sister of filmmaker Kathe Sandler.

Sandler began her professional career at the age of seventeen, first working with jewelry and metals before turning to relief painting in the 1990s.

Sandler's multimedia installation "Mami Wata Crossing" was part of the 2008 exhibition Mami Wata: Arts for Water Spirits in Africa and Its Diasporas at the Fowler Museum. The work examined connections between the pan-African water goddess Mami Wata, genealogy and the middle passage.

Sandler was a part of the Black Women Artists group, along with Carole Byard, Nanette Carter and Howardena Pindell. Sandler was a 1990–1991 resident at the Studio Museum in Harlem. Her work has been exhibited in institutions such as The Bronx Museum of the Arts.
