= Marvin X =

American poet (born 1944)

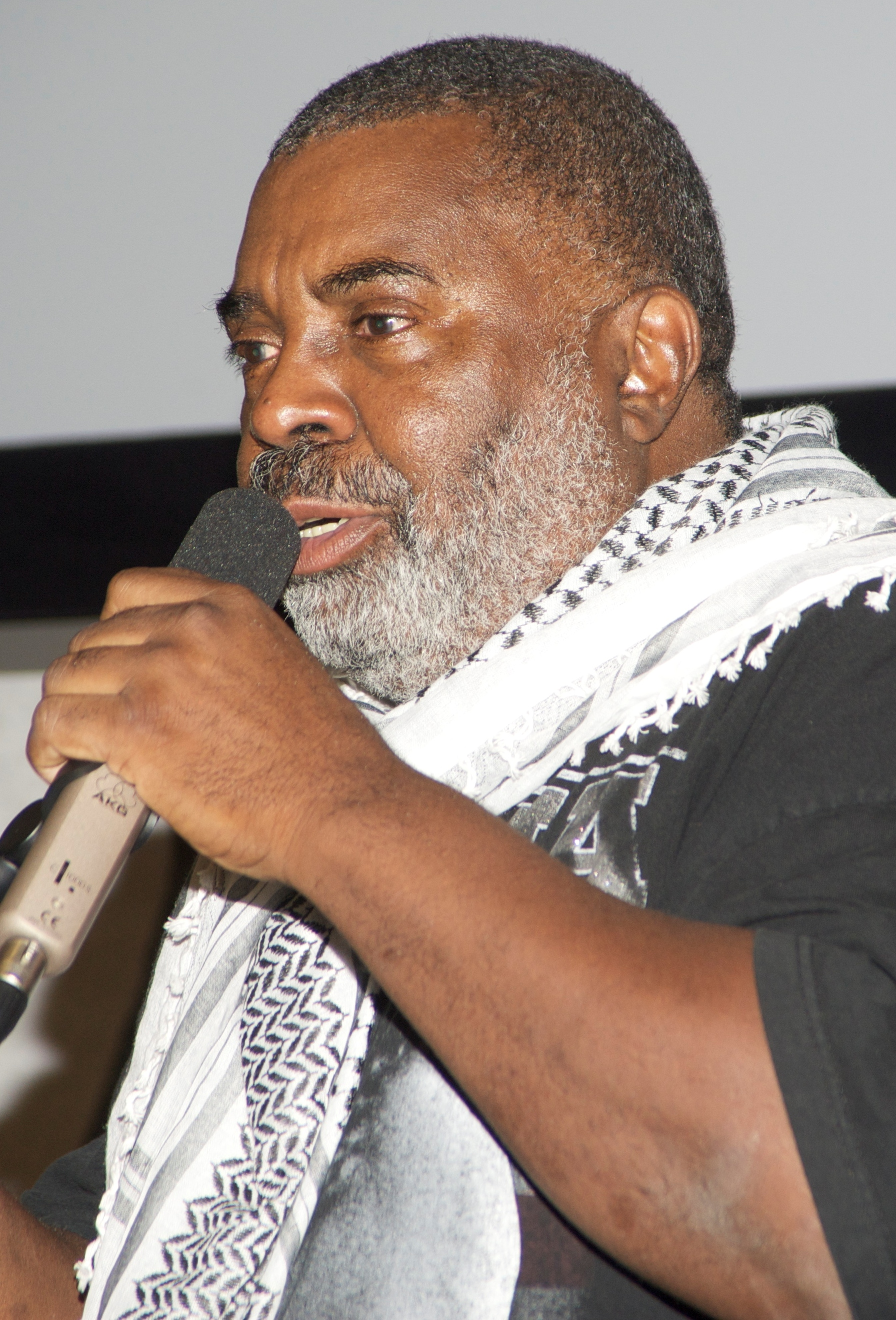
- Marvin X in 2009
- Born: Marvin Ellis Jackmon; May 29, 1944 (age 82); Fowler, California U.S.
- Education: Merritt College; San Francisco State University
- Occupations: Poet; playwright; essayist

Marvin X (born Marvin Ellis Jackmon; May 29, 1944) is an American poet, playwright, and essayist.

Born in Fowler, California, he has taken the Muslim name El Muhajir ("the expatriate" in Arabic). His work has been associated with the Black Arts/Black Aesthetics Movement of the 1960s.

== Family life ==
He grew up in Fresno and Oakland, in an activist household. He graduated from Thomas Alva Edison High School in Fresno in 1962. His parents published the Black-owned paper of Fresno, California, called the Fresno Voice. The 1947 paper advertised community events, local businesses, including their own real-estate business, and focused on national and state events including: the promotion of anti-lynching laws, Jackie Robinson Day, New York Freedom Trains being integrated, the mission work of the Catholic church with Indians and Negroes, and the $350 million expansion of PG&E in California.

Marvin X has four living children and one son who preceded him in death.

== Black Arts Movement ==
Because of his affiliations with Black Panther activists of the day (Huey P. Newton, Bobby Seale and Eldridge Cleaver) and his work in Black theater with Ed Bullins, X is considered one of the major essayists and playwrights of the Black Aesthetics Movement.

He attended Merritt College, where he met Newton and Seale, and received his BA and MA in English from San Francisco State University.

X has taught at San Francisco State University, Fresno State University, UC Berkeley, UC San Diego, Mills College, Merritt College, Laney College, the University of Nevada at Reno and Reedley Community College. He has lectured at colleges and universities, including the University of Arkansas, the University of Houston, Morehouse and Spelman Colleges, the University of Virginia, Howard University, the University of Pennsylvania, Temple University, Fresno City College, Medgar Evers College, New York University, and UMass Boston.

X emerged as an important voice in the Black Arts Movement (BAM), the artistic arm of the Black Power movement, in the mid-to-late 1960s. He wrote for many of the BAM's key journals. He also co-founded, with playwright Ed Bullins and others, two of BAM's premier West Coast headquarters and venues — Oakland's Black House and San Francisco's Black Arts/West Theatre. In 1967, X joined the Nation of Islam and became known as El Muhajir. In the 1980s, he organized the Melvin Black Forum on Human Rights and the first Annual All Black Men's Conference. He also served as an aide to former Black Panther Eldridge Cleaver and created the short-lived Marvin X Center for the Study of World Religions. In 1999, he founded San Francisco's Recovery Theatre. His production of One Day in the Life, the play he wrote about his drug addiction and recovery, became the longest-running African-American drama in Northern California. In 2004, in celebration of Black History Month, he produced the San Francisco Tenderloin Book Fair (also known as the San Francisco Black Radical Book Fair) and University of Poetry. He has taught Black Studies, drama, creative writing, journalism, English and Arabic at a variety of California universities and colleges.

As one of the movers and shakers of the Black Arts Movement (BAM), Marvin X has published 30 books, including essays, poems, plays, anthologies, as well as his autobiography, Somethin' Proper. Notable books include Fly to Allah, Beyond Religion, Toward Spirituality, and How to Recover from the Addiction to White Supremacy. In 2011, UC Berkeley Bancroft Library acquired the Marvin X papers. X continues to work as an activist, educator, writer, and producer.

== Awards and honors ==
- PEN Oakland, Reginald Lockett Lifetime Achievement Award, 2015
- Marvin X Day proclaimed by the City and County of San Francisco, 2001
- Life Member, California Scholarship Federation, Honor Society
- National Endowment for the Arts Writing Fellowship, 1972
- National Endowment for the Humanities Planning Grants, 1979
