= Rosa Guy =

American writer (1922–2012)

- Born: Rosa Cuthbert; September 1, 1922; Diego Martin, Trinidad and Tobago
- Died: June 3, 2012 (aged 89); Manhattan, New York, US
- Occupation: Writer
- Notable work: Bird at My Window (1966); The Friends (1973); Ruby (1976); Edith Jackson (1978); My Love, My Love: Or, The Peasant Girl (1985)
- Spouse: Walter Guy (m. 1941) (divorced 1946)
- Children: 1
- Awards: Coretta Scott King Award; American Library Association's Best Book for Young Adults

Rosa Cuthbert Guy (/ˈɡiː/) (September 1, 1922 – June 3, 2012) was a Trinidad-born American writer and activist who grew up in the New York metropolitan area. Her family had immigrated and she was orphaned when young. Raised in foster homes, she later was acclaimed for her books of fiction for adults and young people that stressed supportive relationships.

Guy lived and worked in New York City, where she was among the founders of the Harlem Writers Guild in 1950. It was highly influential in encouraging African-American writers to gain publication and had a high rate of success. Guy died of cancer on June 3, 2012.

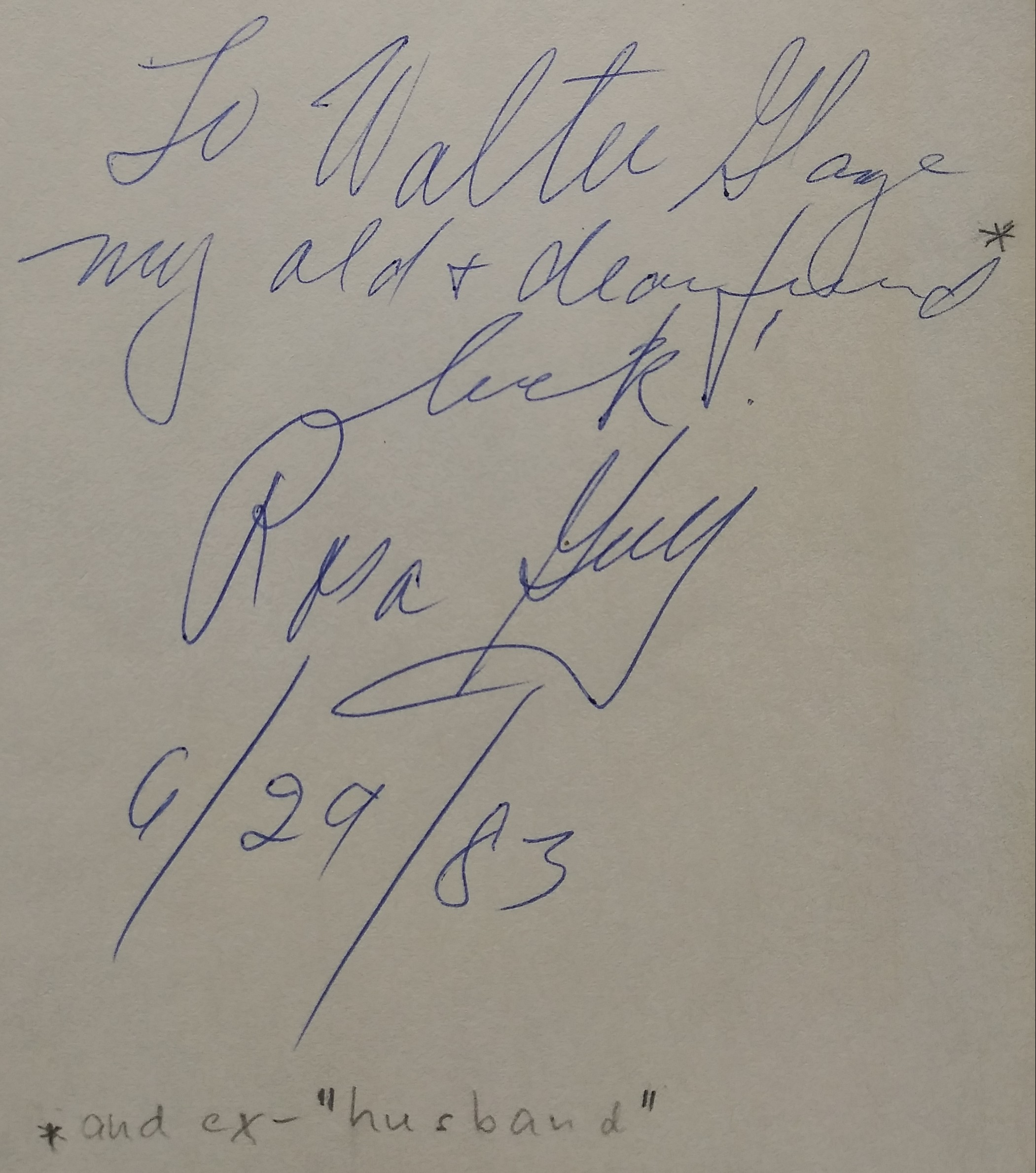
Inscription by Guy on the flyleaf of a copy of her novel A Measure of Time: "To Walter Gaye my old and dear friend luck! Rosa Guy 6/29/83" (with a pencilled footnote in a different hand: "and ex-'husband'")

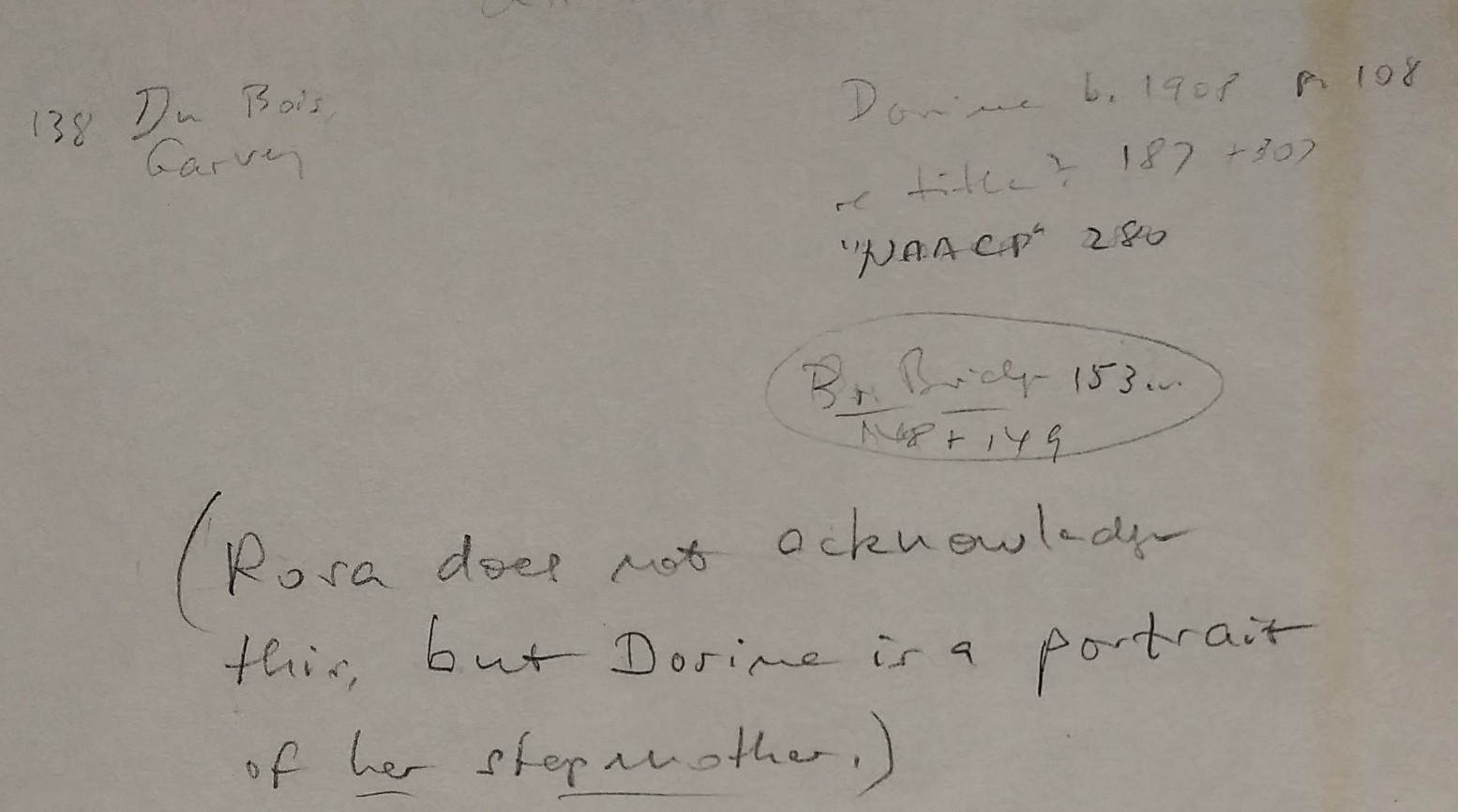
Pencilled note (in the same copy of A Measure of Time as the above inscription): "Rosa does not acknowledge this, but Dorine is a portrait of her stepmother"

== Early years ==
Rosa Cuthbert was born in 1922 in Diego Martin, on the Caribbean island of Trinidad. She and her younger sister Ameze were left with relatives when their parents Audrey and Henry Cuthbert emigrated in 1927 to the United States. The children did not join their parents in Harlem, New York City, until 1932. The following year, their mother became ill, and Rosa and her sister were sent to Brooklyn to live with a cousin. The cousin's espousal of Garveyism and black nationalistic politics deeply affected Rosa, who later said: "I was always there, in Harlem, listening to the speeches. Africa became my thing -- and what was happening to black people in the United States." After their mother's death in 1934, the two girls returned to Harlem to live with their father, who remarried.

When their father died in 1937, the orphaned girls were taken into the welfare system and lived in foster homes. Rosa left school at the age of 14 and took a job in a garment factory to support herself and her sister. Guy would say much later: "Tiptoeing my way through the casualties of poverty in the ghettos — an orphan in New York, ostracized for those traits which being West Indian and Catholic had etched into my personality — wasn't easy…But I never looked back in hate — but with a kind of sadness, a regret that there had been no books yet written, no guidelines from caring adults who might have made a difference, guiding us over the deep but narrow ravines dividing us."

== Career ==
In 1941, at the age of 19, Rosa met and married Warner Guy. While her husband was serving in the Second World War, she continued working in the factory. A co-worker introduced her to the American Negro Theatre, where she studied acting; other graduates included Harry Belafonte and Sidney Poitier. In 1942, her son Warner Guy Jr, was born.

After the war, Rosa Guy moved to Connecticut with her husband and son. Five years later she and her husband divorced, in 1946, and she returned to New York City.

=== Harlem Writers Guild ===
In 1950, along with novelist John Oliver Killens, Guy formed a workshop that was to become the Harlem Writers Guild (HWG). Its goal was "to develop and aid in the publication of works by writers of the African diaspora". Its members and participants included Willard Moore, Walter Christmas, Maya Angelou, Dr. John Henrik Clarke, Paule Marshall, Audre Lorde, Alice Childress, Ossie Davis, Ruby Dee, and Douglas Turner Ward. The Guild was very influential, nurturing more than half of all successful African-American writers between 1950 and 1971; they were associated with the workshop.

Guy also belonged to On Guard for Freedom, a Black nationalist literary organization founded by Calvin Hicks on the Lower East Side of New York City. Other members included LeRoi Jones, Sarah E. Wright and Harold Cruse. On Guard was active in the political realm, supporting Congolese liberation leader Patrice Lumumba and protesting the United States-sponsored Bay of Pigs invasion at Cuba. Following Lumumba's assassination, Guy was a notable participant among a group of African-American activists, including Abbey Lincoln, Max Roach and Maya Angelou, who burst into a United Nations Security Council meeting in protest on February 15, 1961. (Lincoln, Angelou and Guy had had a prior meeting with Malcolm X at the Shabazz Restaurant in Harlem to solicit his opinion, and he had "let them know that he was impressed by their activism against the global imperialism of Belgium and the United States".)

=== Writing and publication ===
In 1954, Guy wrote and performed in her first play, Venetian Blinds, which was successfully produced Off-Broadway at the Tropical Theater.

She also contributed to such publications as the African-American journal Freedomways. Two stories by Guy, "Magnify" and "Carnival", appeared in the Trinidad newspaper The Nation in 1965. The following year, her first novel, Bird at My Window, was published. Attending the first World Festival of Black Arts held in Dakar, Senegal, 1–24 April 1966, Guy was reported as "a striking figure ... playing hookey while her first book, Bird at My Window, was being reviewed back home." As Maya Angelou later commented:

This book was welcomed when it was first published in 1966. Its brave examination of a loving, yet painful, relationship between a Black mother and her son is even more important today. Rosa Guy is a fine writer and she continuously gives us new issues to contemplate. Welcome Bird at My Window.

After the assassination of Martin Luther King in 1968, Guy set out to record the voices of young black Americans in a 1970 documentary work entitled Children of Longing, which contains first-hand accounts of the experiences and aspirations of young people "growing up in a hostile world". She traveled in the Caribbean, living for a while in Haiti and Trinidad.

Most of Guy's books are about the dependability of family members and friends who care and love each other, and her trilogy of novels for young people — The Friends (1973), Ruby (1976), and Edith Jackson (1978) — is based on her own personal experiences, as well as those of many young African Americans growing up in New York City with little or no money or support from family. Ruby tells the story of a young girl seeking love and friendship, who finds it in Daphne Duprey, allowing both girls a new insight of relationships and love. The Friends was made into a 1996 short film directed by Kathe Sandler.

Guy's 1983 novel A Measure of Time, "about a self-made woman's rise amid the Harlem Renaissance", was characterized in Kirkus Reviews as "a restless, gritty, earthy narrative which encompasses flowering and decay--in one woman's life, but also in the brief blooming of the place-and-people that was Harlem's heyday." According to The New York Times, the novel "offers an evocative tour of 20th century black America from the rural south to the streets of New York City. Dorine Davis, the book's protagonist and first person narrator, is a brash and intelligent guide; her observations about people and places are funny, pointed and often moving. ...she and the Harlem settings are vividly described, filled with life and a pleasure to read about."

Published in 1985, Guy's novel My Love, My Love: Or, The Peasant Girl has been described as a Caribbean re-telling of Hans Christian Andersen's fairy tale "The Little Mermaid", "with a dash of Shakespeare's Romeo and Juliet." In Guy's story, Desiree is a beautiful peasant who falls in love with a handsome upper-class boy whom she saved in an accident. His family does not approve of Desiree, for she is too black and too poor for their son who will be king. Concepts of sacrifice and pure love reign throughout the novel. It was adapted for the Broadway musical, Once on This Island by Lynn Ahrens and Stephen Flaherty. The show's original production ran for a year, from 1990 to 1991, and in December 2017 it was revived at the Circle in the Square Theater, winning the 2018 Tony Award for Best Revival of a Musical. In 2019, the musical was produced at the Cincinnati Playhouse in the Park.

=== Death ===
Rosa Guy died of cancer in 2012 at her home on the Upper West Side of Manhattan, aged 89. Her obituary was included in The Socialite who Killed a Nazi with Her Bare Hands: And 144 Other Fascinating People who Died this Year, a collection of New York Times obituaries published in 2012.

== Awards ==
Rosa Guy's work received The New York Times Outstanding Book of the Year citation (for The Friends, in 1973), the Coretta Scott King Award, and the American Library Association's Best Book for Young Adults Award.

== Works ==
- Bird at My Window (London: Souvenir Press, 1966; Allison & Busby, 1985; Virago, 1989; Coffee House Press, 2001)
- Children of Longing (essays, introduction by Julius Lester; New York: Holt, Rinehart, 1970)
- The Friends (New York: Holt, Rinehart & Winston, 1973; London: Victor Gollancz Ltd, 1974; Macmillan Educational, 1982; New York: Bantam Books, 1983; Perfection Learning, 1995; Bantam Doubleday Dell Books for Young Readers, 1996; Heinemann, 1996; Glencoe McGraw-Hill, 2001)
- Ruby (New York: Viking Press, 1976; London: Gollancz, 1981; Puffin Books, 1989)
- Edith Jackson (New York: Viking Juvenile, 1978; London: Gollancz, 1978; Longman, 1989; Puffin, 1995)
- The Disappearance (New York: Delacorte, 1979; Puffin, 1985)
- Mirror of Her Own (New York: Delacorte, 1981)
- Mother Crocodile: An Uncle Amadou Tale from Senegal (illustrated by John Steptoe - Coretta Scott King Award; New York: Delacorte, 1981; Doubleday, 1993). A translation of Birago Diop's Maman-Caïman (1961)
- A Measure of Time (New York: Henry Holt, 1983; London: Virago, 1983)
- New Guys Around the Block (New York: Delacorte, 1983; London: Gollancz, 1983; Laurel Leaf, 1992: Puffin, 1995)
- Paris, Pee Wee and Big Dog (London: Gollancz, 1984; New York: Delacorte, 1985; Puffin, 1986; Nelson Thornes Ltd, 1988)
- My Love, My Love, or the Peasant Girl (New York: Holt, Rinehart & Winston, 1985; London: Virago, 2000; Coffee House Press, 2002)
- And I Heard a Bird Sing (New York: Delacorte, 1987; London: Gollancz, 1987; Puffin, 1994)
- The Ups and Downs of Carl Davis III (Delacorte, 1989; Gollancz, 1989; Collins Educational, 1994)
- Billy the Great Child (London: Gollancz, 1991; New York: Delacorte, 1992)
- The Music of Summer (New York: Delacorte, 1992)
- The Sun, the Sea, A Touch of the Wind (New York: E. P. Dutton, 1995)
