= Lorenzo Thomas (poet) =

American poet (1944–2005)

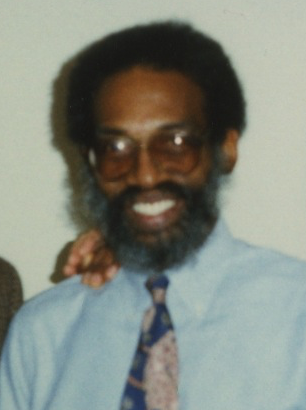
- Born: August 31, 1944; Panama
- Died: July 4, 2005 (aged 60)
- Occupations: Poet; Critic
- Years active: 1973–2005
- Known for: Umbra Workshop

Lorenzo Thomas (August 31, 1944 – July 4, 2005) was an American poet and critic. He was born in the Republic of Panama and grew up in New York City, where his family immigrated in 1948. In 1973, Thomas moved to Houston, Texas. Thomas had a two decade career as a professor at the University of Houston–Downtown.

== Early life ==
Thomas was born in Panama to Afro-Caribbean parents. His father, a pharmacist, was from Saint Vincent and his mother, Luzmilda, a community activist, was Jamaican, born in Costa Rica. Her sister Sadie Clemencia Dolphy was the mother of musician Eric Dolphy. As a child in NYC, he attended Duke Ellington Elementary School (P.S. 140;) Edgar D. Shimer Junior High School (P.S. 142;) and Andrew Jackson High School.

Thomas was a graduate of Queens College in New York with a B.A. in English literature, and minor in History & Communication Arts (Radio and Television.) He pursued graduate work towards an M.L.S. at the Pratt Institute. During his years in New York, he joined the Umbra Workshop, and was one of the youngest members. The Umbra Workshop drew young writers to the Lower East Side of New York City in search of their artistic voices. It served as a crucible for emerging black poets, among them Ishmael Reed, David Henderson and Calvin C. Hernton. The workshop was one of the currents that fed the Black Arts Movement of the '60s and '70s, the first major African-American artistic movement after the Harlem Renaissance.

== Naval service ==
From 1968 to 1972 Thomas served in the U.S. Navy, attaining the rate of 2nd Class Petty Office (E-5) Radioman. He served in Vietnam (in-country); attended Navy schools for electronics, radio, and Vietnamese language; had experience as a platoon leader, radio and computer operator, master-at-arms, and supervisor of civilian employees. He was honorably discharged in 1972.

== Career ==
In 1973, Thomas moved to Houston as writer-in-residence at Texas Southern University. At Texas Southern, he helped edit the journal Roots. Beginning in 1984 and for more than two decades as a professor of English at the University of Houston–Downtown. From 1973 to 1979 he served as Writer in Residence at Texas Southern University, Florida A & M University; the State of Arkansas; and the state of Oklahoma.

Thomas also made important contributions to the study of African-American literature.

In 2000, he published Extraordinary Measures: Afrocentric Modernism and 20th-Century American Poetry, his overview of the work of James Fenton and Amiri Baraka, among others.

== Death ==
Thomas died in July 2005 at Texas Medical Center Hospice from emphysema.

== Works and publications ==
- Thomas, Lorenzo (1972). Fit Music. New York, NY: Angel Hair Books.
- Thomas, Lorenzo (1973). Dracula. New York, NY: Angel Hair Books. OCLC 84114955. "Published in an edition of 300 copies by Angel Hair at the Poetry Project, St. Mark's Church In-the-Bowery, N.Y.C."
- Thomas, Lorenzo (1975). Jambalaya: Four Poets. Reed, Cannon & Johnson.
- Thomas, Lorenzo; Farber, Jim (cover art) (2003). Chances Are Few (2nd ed.). Berkeley, CA: Blue Wind Press. ISBN 978-0-912-65277-1. OCLC 53004628. "Expanded second edition (of 1980 original publication) collects new poems, and includes an introduction by the author"
- Thomas, Lorenzo (1981). The Bathers. New York, NY: I. Reed Books. ISBN 978-0-918-40818-1. OCLC 8627248.
- Thomas, Lorenzo (1988). I Cudda Had A V-8: Poetry and The Vernacular (PDF). New York, NY: The Poetry Project, Ltd. "A lecture delivered on April 7, 1988 as part of the Poetry Project's 1988 Symposium, Poetry of Everyday Life"
- Thomas, Lorenzo (2000). Extraordinary Measures: Afrocentric Modernism and Twentieth-Century American Poetry. Tuscaloosa, AL: University of Alabama Press. ISBN 978-0-817-31014-1. OCLC 42080108.
- Thomas, Lorenzo (2004). Dancing on Main Street: Poems (1st ed.). Minneapolis, MN: Coffee House Press. ISBN 978-1-566-89156-1. OCLC 54065671.
- Thomas, Lorenzo (2004). Time Step: 5 Poems, 4 Seasons. East Bay, CA: Kenning Editions. OCLC 55104023.
- Thomas, Lorenzo; Nielsen, Aldon Lynn (2008). Don't Deny My Name: Words and Music and the Black Intellectual Tradition. Ann Arbor, MI: University of Michigan Press. ISBN 978-0-472-09892-7. OCLC 179794180.

== Early Prizes ==
- 1963 - Dwight L. Durling Prize in Poetry, John Golden Award for Creative Writing
- 1966 - Poets Foundation Award
- 1973 - Committee on Poetry grant
- 1974 - Poets Foundation Award
- 1974 - Lucille Medwick Award
- 2000 - Foundation for Contemporary Arts Grants to Artists award
