= Negro Digest =

U.S. magazine for the African-American market

The Negro Digest
- April 1947 Negro Digest cover featuring Chicago Veterans Administration worker Carolyn Pegues.
- Publisher and Editor: John H. Johnson
- Staff writers: Ben Burns (c. 1947)
- Photographer: Leroy Winbust (c. 1947)
- Categories: News Magazine
- Frequency: Monthly
- Publisher: Johnson Publishing Company
- Founder: John H. Johnson
- First issue: November 1942; 83 years ago
- Final issue: April 1976; 50 years ago
- Country: United States
- Based in: Chicago, Illinois
- Language: English
- Website: www.negrodigest.com
- OCLC: 671590707

The Negro Digest, later renamed Black World, was a magazine for the African-American market. Founded in November 1942 by publisher John H. Johnson of Johnson Publishing Company, Negro Digest was first published locally in Chicago, Illinois. The magazine was similar to the Reader's Digest but aimed to cover positive stories about the African-American community. The Negro Digest ceased publication in 1951 but returned in 1961. In 1970, Negro Digest was renamed Black World and continued to appear until April 1976.

== History ==
In 1942, when John H. Johnson sought financial backing for his first magazine project, he was unable to find any backers—black or white. From white bank officers to the editor of the National Association for the Advancement of Colored People's (NAACP) nonprofit publication, all agreed that a magazine aimed at a black audience had no chance for any kind of success. Johnson at the time worked at the Supreme Liberty Life Insurance Company and had the idea of funding the Negro Digest by writing everyone on their mailing list and soliciting a two-dollar, prepaid subscription, calculating that even a 15 percent response would give him the amount needed to publish the first issue.

To obtain the 500 dollars needed for postage to mail his letters, he had to use his mother's furniture as a security on a loan. Johnson called the magazine the Negro Digest after the Reader's Digest and reprinted articles by and about African-American scholars from the African-American and Caucasian media. It was edited by Ben Burns. Despite being called the Negro Digest, the magazine usually reproduced articles in their entirety, rather than digests. The letter generated 3,000 responses, and the first issue of Negro Digest was published in November 1942.

However, there were still obstacles to be overcome. Distributors were unwilling to put the periodical on their newsstands, for they too believed that it would not sell. Johnson persuaded his friends to haunt their neighborhood newsstands, demanding copies of Negro Digest. Joseph Levy, a magazine distributor, was impressed and formed an alliance with Johnson. He provided valuable marketing ideas and opened the doors that allowed Negro Digest to hit the newsstands in other urban centers. The very first issue of The Negro Digest sold about 3,000 copies. Over the course of six months the magazine published close to 50,000 copies per month. One of the most interesting and well-known columns in the magazine was entitled "If I Were a Negro".

This column concentrated strongly on the unsolicited advice that the African-American race had received, by asking prominent citizens mainly of the white race for resolution to unsolved black problems. As a result of First Lady Eleanor Roosevelt's contribution to the popular column "If I Were a Negro", the copies sold doubled overnight. Johnson went on to create other magazines aimed at an African-American readership, including Ebony (founded in 1945) and Jet (founded in 1951). As a result of the publication of these two magazines, the circulation of The Negro Digest declined. According to a New York Times article, it soon became unprofitable and ceased publication in 1951.

=== Rebirth and termination ===
After the failure of the magazine in 1951, Johnson, alongside Hoyt W. Fuller, revived the magazine and gave it a different spin in the early 1960s. In 1970, the periodical was renamed Black World to more accurately reflect the range of its audience, which extended to Africa and much of the African diaspora. Black World reflected Fuller's concerns with politics, social action, the spiritual and economic health of the black world, as well as a broad view of artistic expression. Despite its audience, the magazine was open to any ideas and opinions. By 1970, a typical issue contained approximately eight articles, a couple of short stories, poems, and a section called "Perspectives", which was a collection of cultural information prepared by Fuller. A short reflective essay by Fuller frequently occupied the back cover. In 1976, Black World was abruptly terminated by the publisher, occasioning widespread protest in the Black Arts community.

== Impact ==
Although Negro Digest/Black World gave way to other African-American magazines such as Ebony, Jet and Essence, it significantly impacted the Black Arts Movement of the 1960s and early '70s, and as well as literary work showcased reproductions of artworks. In the words of Chris Brancaccio: "Negro Digest/Black World is a fascinating artifact because the content of each issue seems to evade rigid binaries like integrationist or nationalist, and therefore became a very real space for public debate. For instance, the November 1966 issue contains an article entitled Black Power Symposium [and] features 12 different opinions on Black Power, offered by a diverse group of black individuals ranging from Conrad Kent Rivers, founder of Organization of Black American Culture (OBAC), to Anita Cornwell, a writer and former state employee, to Dudley Randall, founder of Broadside Press but also a librarian and poet. ... Negro Digest/Black World constitutes a massive archive. A renewed scholarly interest in these periodicals offers new perspectives and could profoundly change the way we consider the Black Arts Movement and Black activism during this period."

== 2021 relaunch ==
In January 2021, filmmaker and publisher Bayer Mack relaunched Negro Digest as a digital publication targeting African-American men in the United States.

The relaunched publication focuses on cultural commentary, lifestyle content, and issues relevant to Black male audiences.

In interviews, Mack described the platform as a modern revival of the historic brand, adapted for digital distribution and community engagement.

== Contributors and writers ==
- A. Peter Bailey
- Albert Cleage
- William Montague Cobb
- Eugenia Collier
- Anita Cornwell
- Sam Greenlee
- Gwendolyn Midlo Hall
- Nathan Hare
- Kristin Hunter
- Charles R. Johnson
- June Jordan
- John Oliver Killens
- Etheridge Knight
- George Washington Lee
- Larry Neal
- Roi Ottley
- Ann Petry
- Rosey E. Pool
- Norman Pritchard
- Dudley Randall
- Lennox Raphael
- Kalamu ya Salaam
- Sonia Sanchez
- George Schuyler
- Jean Smith Young
