= Calvin Hicks (journalist) =

American journalist, activist, editor, and music educator

- Born: Calvin L. Hicks; August 18, 1933; Boston, Massachusetts, U.S.
- Died: August 25, 2013 (aged 80); New York, U.S.
- Occupations: Journalist; activist; editor; music educator

Calvin L. Hicks (August 18, 1933 – August 25, 2013) was an African-American journalist, activist, editor, and music educator. He died in New York.

== Life ==
Born in Boston, United States, Hicks wrote for the Boston Chronicle while still in high school. He graduated from Drake University. After writing for the Baltimore Afro-American newspaper, he moved to New York City where in 1960, he founded and chaired the On Guard Committee for Freedom, a Black nationalist literary organization on the Lower East Side. Its members included Nannie and Walter Bowe, Harold Cruse, Amiri Baraka, Tom Dent, Rosa Guy, Joe Johnson, Archie Shepp, and Sarah Wright, among others. The organization viewed the liberation of Africa as part of the struggle for Black liberation in the United States. On Guard went on to publish their own newspaper with Hicks as the editor.

Hicks was executive director of the Monroe Defense Committee in support of Robert F. Williams, and was active in the Fair Play for Cuba Committee. He was one of the founders of Umbra Magazine, with poet and writer Tom Dent. Hicks was also a member of the Harlem Writers Guild, and active in the Black Arts Movement, where he is considered to have been one of the primary players. As a freelance writer, his articles appeared in Freedomways, New Challenge, New York Age.

=== Educational work ===
He worked as an instructor at Brooklyn College, Richmond College (now known as College of Staten Island) and City College of New York. Beginning in 1969, he taught at Brandeis University, and then at Goddard College, Brown University, and at Roxbury Community College. He was a co-founder of the Black Educators Roundtable in Boston. From 1974 to 1975, he was a graduate fellow at the Massachusetts Institute of Technology. In 1984, he graduated from Cambridge College with a master's degree in the philosophy of education. He was a member of the liberal arts faculty and administration at the New England Conservatory of Music from 1992 to 2008 and was also on the faculty of the Longy School of Music.

== Death and legacy ==
The Calvin Hicks Memorial Award for the Study of Music was established in his memory.

=== Awards ===
- Distinguished Achievement in Education Award (Boston Orchestra and Chorale, 1998)
- Distinguished Service Award, Dean of Arts and Sciences (Roxbury Community College, 1990)
- Greater Boston Gospel Academy Award (Roxbury Community Presbyterian Church, 1995)
- Millennium Award (Boston Orchestra and Chorale, 2001)
- Gospel in Majesty Award (Tri-ad Veterans League, Inc. and Magnolia Society, 2002)
- African Americans Making History Today: Bearers of the Flame/Passing the Torch Award (The Students of the Boston Renaissance Charter School, 2003)
- Community Fellows and Reflective Practice Alumni Award 2006, Massachusetts Institute of Technology, Department of Urban Studies and Planning
- Anna Bobbit Gardner/Coretta Scott King Lifetime Achievement Award 2005
- Mayor Thomas Menino of Boston declares "Calvin Hicks Day" (date: February 15) 2009
- Drum Major Award from the Dr. Martin Luther King, Jr. Association, 2010
