= Black Art (poem) =

Poem by Amiri Baraka

"Black Art" is a poem written by African-American poet Amiri Baraka. Baraka wrote it in 1965, while still known as LeRoi Jones, after the assassination of Malcolm X. The poem called for art by and for Black people:

We want a black poem. And a
Black World.
Let the world be a Black Poem
And Let All Black People Speak This Poem
Silently
or LOUD

The poem sparked the beginning of the Black Arts Movement in poetry. "Black Art" was published in The Liberator in January 1966, and subsequently re-published in numerous anthologies. The poem has been described as one of Baraka's most expressive political poems for its use of sharp language, onomatopoeia and violence, and also as one of the most controversial contributions to the Black Arts Movement.

== Interpretations ==
The poem is about poetry and argues that black artists must stand for being black and not copy or imitate white poets. Baraka calls on black artists to give their art meaning and to produce content that defends their blackness. Baraka felt that his work should fully expose nationwide racism and create "poems that kill". Baraka uses terms such as "negroleader", "jewlady's", and "whities" to explain that his message is targeting the race hardships faced for people of color living in the American South in the 1960s. In the line, "Let there be no love poems written until love can exist freely and cleanly," Baraka calls for realism in black poetry and for poets to stop over-glorifying the lives that black people must live in a racist nation.

A poem such as "Black Art", according to Werner Sollors of Harvard University, expressed the author's need to commit the violence required to "establish a Black World". Baraka uses onomatopoeia to express that need for violence: "rrrrrrrrrrrrrrrrrrrrrrrrrrrrrrrrrrr... tuhtuhtuhtuhtuhtuht". More specifically, lines in "Black Art" such as "Let there be no love poems written / until love can exist freely and cleanly" juxtaposed with "We want a black poem. / And a Black World" demonstrate Baraka's call for political justice at a time of widespread racial injustice despite the Civil Rights Movement.

In this piece, Baraka merges politics with art, criticizing poems that are not useful to or adequately representative of the Black struggle. First published in 1966 during the Civil Rights Movement, the poem's political aspect underscores the need for a concrete and artistic approach to the realities of racism and injustice. The Black Arts Movement, rooted in the Civil Rights Movement and recognized as its artistic component, aimed to give a political voice to black artists, including poets, dramatists, writers and musicians. Baraka, a central figure in the movement, criticizes what he considered unproductive and assimilatory actions by political leaders during the Civil Rights Movement. He describes prominent Black leaders as being "on the steps of the white house...kneeling between the sheriff's thighs negotiating coolly for his people."

Baraka also presents issues of Eurocentric mentality, referring to Elizabeth Taylor as a prototypical model in a society that influences perceptions of beauty, emphasizing its influence on individuals of white and black ancestry. Baraka aims his message toward the Black community, with the purpose of coalescing African Americans into a unified movement, devoid of white influences. "Black Art" serves as a medium for expression meant to strengthen that solidarity and creativity, in terms of the Black Aesthetic. Baraka believes poems should "shoot... come at you, love what you are" and not succumb to mainstream desires.

== Influence ==
Baraka's cathartic structure and aggressive tone have been compared to the beginnings of hip hop, which created controversy in the realm of mainstream acceptance because of its "authentic, un-distilled, unmediated forms of contemporary black urban music." Baraka believed that integration inherently takes away from the legitimacy of having a Black identity and Aesthetic in an anti-Black world. Much of Baraka's disillusionment with unproductive integration can be traced to the 1950s, a period of rock and roll, in which "record labels actively sought to have white artists 'cover' songs that were popular on the rhythm-and-blues charts" originally performed by African American artists. Baraka predicts the revolutionary nature of hip hop, which is manifested in his reference to "live words... and live flesh and coursing blood." This method of expression in music closely parallels Baraka's ideals presented in "Black Art," which focus on poetry that is also productively and politically driven.
