= Kathe Sandler =

American filmmaker (born 1959)

- Born: May 11, 1959 (age 67); Mexico City, Mexico
- Occupation: Filmmaker
- Notable work: A Question of Color (1993)
- Relatives: Eve Sandler (sister)

Kathe Sandler (born May 11, 1959) is a filmmaker. She won a 1996 Guggenheim Award and two Prized Pieces Awards from the National Black Programming Consortium. She also received two fellowships from New York Foundation for the Arts for filmmaking.

== Early life ==
Sandler was born in Mexico City, Mexico, to Joan Sandler, former Community Education Director of the Metropolitan Museum of Art, and Alvin Sandler, a painter and graphic artist. She attended American Film Institute's Directing Workshop for Women. Her sister is Eve Sandler.

== Career ==
Best known for her feature documentary A Question of Color, Sandler notably explores prejudice, racial identity and the color caste system through the lens of the Black community.

Sandler also made a film called Remembering Thelma, about the dancer Thelma Hill, which received its debut at the 1982 New York Film Festival.

Sandler directed The Friends, a dramatic film based on Rosa Guy's book of the same name.

Sandler is a doctoral student in Women's and Gender Studies at Rutgers University.

== Personal life ==
On January 7, 1984, she married Luke Charles Harris at the home of Evelyn Neal in Manhattan.

== Filmography ==
- Finding a Way: New Initiative in Justice for Children
- 1982: Remembering Thelma
- 1993: A Question of Color
- 1996: The Friends
- When and Where We Enter: Stories of Black Feminism
