= Jean Smith Young =

American psychiatrist, writer, and civil rights activist

Jean Smith Young (born 1942) is an American psychiatrist, writer, and civil rights activist. She was an organizer with the Student Nonviolent Coordinating Committee (SNCC) during the 1964 Freedom Summer.

== Early life and education ==
Jean Smith Young was born Jean Wheeler in 1942. She grew up in Conant Gardens, Detroit, the daughter of a nurse and single mother. Her father, First Lieutenant Jimmie D. Wheeler, was a pilot and member of the Tuskegee airmen who died during World War II. She graduated from Cass Technical High School in 1961 and continued on to Howard University on a full scholarship.

While at Howard, Young was involved with the Nonviolent Action Group (NAG) and a member of the student council. As a young activist, she was one of many young women resisting what they saw as old-fashioned standards of respectability imposed by institutions. When asked by then-Dean of Women Patricia Roberts Harris to straighten her natural hair, Young refused. She graduated with honors and as a Phi Beta Kappa member in 1965. By that time, Harris had become an important mentor figure.

== Activism ==
After becoming involved with NAG at Howard, Young signed up to be a field worker for SNCC in the summer of 1963. She would work as an organizer and community bridge leader with the group until 1967. After participating in integrated SNCC voter registration projects in southwest Georgia, Young and several close colleagues moved to work on the Mississippi project – which had less of an emphasis on involving white volunteers – after becoming disillusioned by the difficulty of educating and training white volunteers to be effective organizers.

Young was a leader in the 1964 voter registration drive in Philadelphia, Mississippi, and surrounding Neshoba County. The project was met with violence, as evidenced by the abduction and murder of James Chaney, Andrew Goodman, and Michael Schwerner, and Young slept at night with a chair wedged under her doorknob for safety. While in Philadelphia, she worked to register voters and establish a local Freedom School.

Although she once described SNCC as "a liberating experience for me as a woman," Young left the organization in the late 1960s after perceiving that leadership roles had begun to be closed to women as the group formalized and narrowed its scope.

== Writing ==
Young began having her writing published while she was still involved in the civil rights movement. In January 1964, her essay "And Let Us All Be Black Together" was published in Negro Digest. She would have several pieces of creative writing published in that magazine over the next few years, and a personal essay published in Redbook in 1967.

Wheeler's best known work is the short story "That She Would Dance No More," which was first published in Negro Digest in January 1967. The story deals thematically with self-destruction, misogyny, and internalized racism. Her other stories also involve such difficult issues, tracing the recurring patterns of oppression in Black history in the United States.

== Later career ==
Young later went back to school and earned a master's degree, then went to George Washington University School of Medicine for her M.D. She works as a child and adolescent psychiatrist in Maryland.
