= David Henderson (poet) =

American writer and poet (1942–2026)

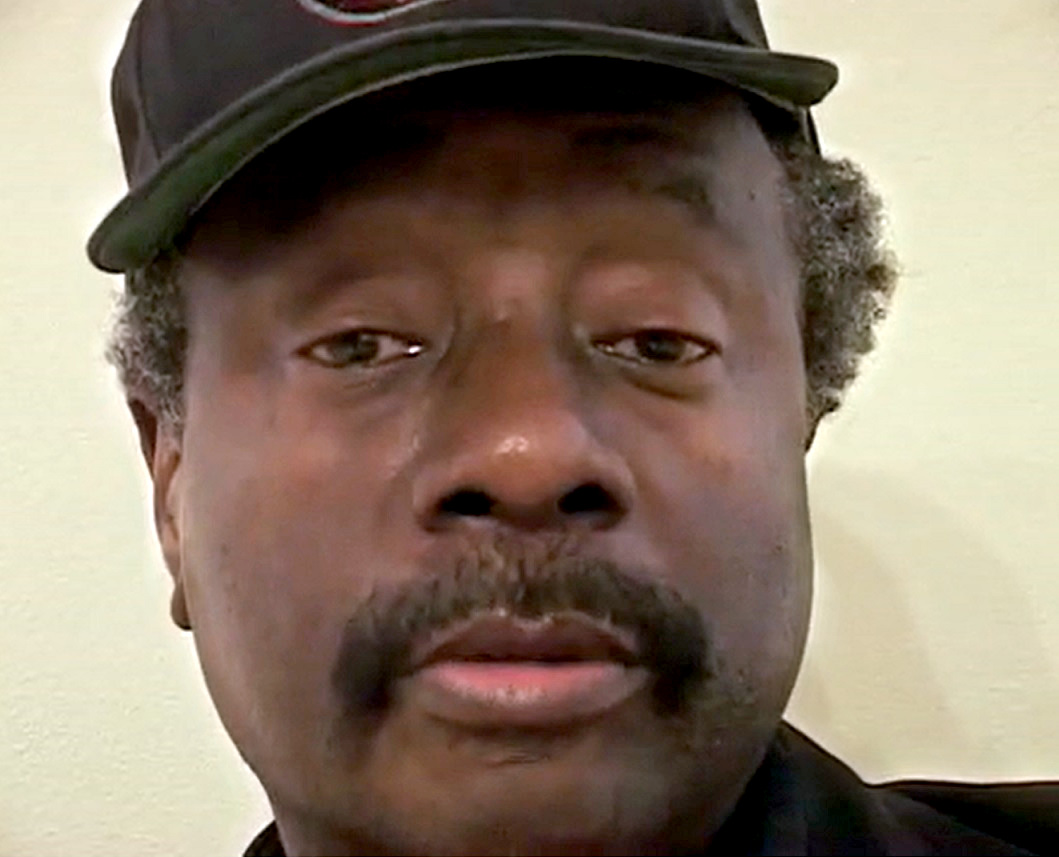
- Born: September 19, 1942; New York City, U.S.
- Died: May 14, 2026 (aged 83); Lincoln Park, New Jersey, U.S.
- Education: Bronx Community College; Hunter College; New School for Social Research
- Occupations: Writer, poet
- Notable work: 'Scuse Me While I Kiss the Sky -- Jimi Hendrix, Voodoo Child

David Henderson (September 19, 1942 – May 14, 2026) was an American writer and poet. He was a co-founder of the Black Arts Movement in the 1960s. Henderson was an active member of New York's Lower East Side art community for more than 40 years. His work appeared in many literary publications and anthologies, and he published four volumes of his own poetry. He is best known for his biography of rock guitarist Jimi Hendrix, which Henderson revised and expanded for a second edition that was published in 2009.

== Early life and work ==
David Henderson was born in Harlem, New York City, on September 19, 1942. He was raised in Harlem, and attended Bronx Community College, Hunter College and the New School for Social Research. He studied writing, communications and Eastern cultures without ever completing a degree. His first published poem appeared in the New York newsweekly Black American in 1960. Henderson became active in the many Black nationalist, arts and anti-war movements, upon moving to the Lower East Side of New York.

He worked with the National Endowment for the Humanities, the Free Southern Theatre in New Orleans, and the Teachers and Writers Collaborative at Columbia University. He was poet-in-resident and taught at City College of New York. In the late 1960s and 1970s, he served on the board of directors of the University Without Walls in Berkeley and as artistic consultant to the Berkeley Public Schools while living in California. He also taught English and Afro-American literature at the University of California at Berkeley and San Diego. Later, he taught courses, seminars, and workshops at Long Island University, New York's New School and St. Mark's Poetry Project.

Henderson's poetry has been included in numerous anthologies, including two that were edited by Langston Hughes. Henderson has also contributed to many periodicals and other publications including Black American Literature Forum, Black Scholar, Essence, Paris Review, New American Review, Saturday Review, and The New York Times.

He spent more than five years researching, interviewing, and writing the biography Jimi Hendrix: Voodoo Child of the Aquarian Age, which was originally published in 1978. It was condensed and revised as 'Scuse Me While I Kiss the Sky in 1981. An expanded and revised edition was published in 2009 as 'Scuse Me While I Kiss the Sky: The Life of Jimi Hendrix.

=== Umbra ===
In 1962, Henderson co-founded Umbra, both a literary collective and literary magazine, with other Black writers and artists in New York's Lower East Side. Henderson began as co-editor and then later became the general editor.

=== Personal life and death ===
Henderson had a son, Imetai Malik Henderson. He married Barbara Christian, the scholar and black feminist critic. Together, they had a daughter, Najuma Ide Henderson. Henderson and Christian later divorced.

Henderson died in Lincoln Park, New Jersey, on May 14, 2026, at the age of 83.

== Selected works ==
=== Books ===
- Felix of the Silent Forest (poetry), Poets Press, 1967
- De Mayor of Harlem (poetry), Dutton, 1970; North Atlantic Books, 1985
- Jimi Hendrix: Voodoo Child of the Aquarian Age, Doubleday, 1978; condensed and revised as 'Scuse Me While I Kiss the Sky: The Life of Jimi Hendrix, Bantam, 1981; revised and reissued, Omnibus, 2003. Expanded edition, Simon & Schuster, 2009.
- The Low East, North Atlantic Books, 1980
- Neo-California, North Atlantic Books, 1998

=== Edited books ===
- Umbra Anthology 1967–1968, Society of Umbra, 1968
- Umbra/Latin Soul 1974–1975, Society of Umbra, 1975

=== Anthology appearances ===
- New Negro Poets: USA, Indiana University, Press, 1964
- Where is Vietnam? American Poets Respond, Anchor/Doubleday, 1967
- Black Fire: An Anthology of Afro-American Writing, Morrow, 1968
- The World Anthology: Poems from Saint Mark's Poetry Project, Bobbs-Merrill, 1969
- Poetry of the Negro, 1746-1970, Doubleday, 1970
- Open Poetry: Four Anthologies of Expanded Poems. Simon & Schuster, 1973
- Moment's Notice: Jazz in Poetry & Prose, Coffee House Press, 1993
- Trouble the Water: 250 Years of American-American Poetry, Signet, 1997

=== Recordings ===
- New Jazz Poets, Broadside, 1967
- Black Poets IV, Pacifica Tape Library, 1973
- Poems: Selections, Library of Congress, 1978
- (With Sun Ra) "Love in Outer Space", The Singles, Evidence, 1996
- (With Ornette Coleman) The Complete Science Fiction Sessions, Columbia/Legacy, 2000

== Awards and fellowships ==
- 1971: Great Lakes Colleges Association New Writers Award
- 1992: California Arts Council, New Genre Poetry Grant
- 1998: Foundation for Contemporary Arts, Grants to Artists award
- 1999: New York Foundation for the Arts, Artist Fellowship
