= Barbara Christian =

American author and professor (1943–2000)

- Born: Barbara T. Christian; December 12, 1943; St. Thomas, US Virgin Islands
- Died: June 25, 2000 (aged 56); Berkeley, Alameda County, California
- Occupations: educator, feminist, writer
- Years active: 1963–2000
- Known for: African-American feminist studies
- Notable work: Black Women Novelists: The Development of a Tradition (1980)

Barbara T. Christian (December 12, 1943 – June 25, 2000) was an American author and professor of African-American Studies at the University of California, Berkeley. Among several books, and more than 100 published articles, Christian was best known for the 1980 study Black Women Novelists: The Development of a Tradition.

== Early life ==
Barbara Christian was born on December 12, 1943, in St. Thomas, US Virgin Islands, to Ruth and Alphonso Christian. Her father was a judge in St. Thomas and both of her parents strongly encouraged their children in pursuing academic goals. Christian was an avid reader and questioned why there were no African-American or Afro-Caribbean women included in her education or the stories she read. At the age of fifteen, Christian moved to Milwaukee, Wisconsin, to attend Marquette University, graduating in 1963 cum laude. Though her parents urged her to pursue medicine, Christian enrolled in graduate studies for literature at Columbia University in New York City. The school did not offer black studies at that time, but Christian chose Columbia because it would give her access to the Harlem intellectual community. Becoming friends with Langston Hughes, she was introduced to the works of black writers. Zora Neale Hurston, overlooked at the time, was an influence, especially her work, Their Eyes Were Watching God.

During her graduate studies, Christian taught English briefly during 1963 and 1964 at both the College of the Virgin Islands and Hunter College. The following year, she became a lecturer at the City College of the City University of New York and worked in a program to promote higher education to minority and underprivileged scholars, known as Search for Education, Elevation, and Knowledge (SEEK). Upon completion of her dissertation, Spirit Bloom in Harlem: The Search for Black Aesthetic during the Harlem Renaissance: The Poetry of Claude McKay, Countee Cullen, and Jean Toomer, Christian earned her PhD in American and British Literature in 1970.

== Career ==
Immediately following her degree, Christian was promoted to an assistant professorship at City College, teaching English. The following year, she became an assistant professor at University of California, Berkeley (UC Berkeley) and in 1972, was a pivotal player in creating the African-American studies department at the university. Committed to increasing educational opportunities for minorities and the disadvantaged, she was a founding member and an instructor at the University Without Walls in 1971. In 1978, Christian was granted tenure at UC Berkeley, the first African-American woman to be tenured and the same year she was elected chair of the Department of African American Studies. During the 1970s, Christian began work editing part of the Norton Anthology of African American Literature, which she would continue for the next two decades. She was one of the first scholars to bring the works of Toni Morrison and Alice Walker to the attention of academia.

Christian published her first book, Black Women Novelists:The Development of a Tradition, 1892–1976 in 1980. It was a groundbreaking analysis, being the first comprehensive study, on works from nineteenth century to contemporary times (mid-1970s) of the black feminist literature. The book quickly became a reference for other scholars, leading to the development the academic study of black feminists, and her most known work. Christian held the chair of African American Studies until 1983. In 1985, she published Black Feminist Criticism: Perspectives on Black Women Writers. In it, she argued that an obsession with theory and the use of literature to advance ideological viewpoints were thwarting scholars from focusing on the literary traditions of the work itself. In 1986, Christian was promoted, as the first woman of African descent, to full professor. That same year, she became the inaugural chair of the newly created doctoral program of ethnic studies; a position she held for three years. In 1991, Christian received the Distinguished Teaching Award from UC Berkeley and in 1994, was honored with the MELUS Distinguished Contribution to Ethnic Studies Award bestowed by The Society for the Study of the Multi-Ethnic Literature of the United States.

Barbara Christian's "The Race for Theory" was published in 1987 in the academic journal Cultural Critique. The essay gave a state-of-the-field of literary criticism and argued that literary theory was becoming increasingly abstract, disconnected, and expressed in mystifying language. Christian tied this phenomenon directly to a rise in critics being trained solely as academics, without any experience as creative writers. She stated that this method of producing theory helped exclude peoples of color, black women, Latin Americans, and Africans from the category of theorists. It also discounted the many variations in language, style, and genre that comprise theory. Christian wrote against the idea that literary theory should be generalizable or universal, instead calling for specific approaches for every text: "So my 'method,' to use a new 'lit. crit' word, is not fixed but relates to what I read and to the historical context of the writers I read and to the many critical activities in which I am engaged, which may or may not involve writing."

In April 2000, Christian was awarded the UC Berkeley's highest honor, the Berkeley Citation, "for distinguished achievement and for notable service to the university". She died on June 25, 2000, from complications from lung cancer. She had been married to the poet David Henderson, the marriage ending in divorce.

== Selected works ==
- Christian, Barbara (1980). Black Women Novelist: The Development of a Tradition, 1892-1976. Westport, Connecticut: Greenwood Press. ISBN 978-0-313-20750-1.
- Christian, Barbara T.; Sterling, Dorothy (1980). Teaching Guide to Accompany 'Black Foremothers, Three Lives' by Dorothy Sterling. Old Westbury, New York: Feminist Press. ISBN 978-0-912-67074-4.
- Christian, Barbara (1985). Black Feminist Criticism: Perspectives on Black women writers. New York, New York: Pergamon Press. ISBN 978-0-08-031956-8.
- Christian, Barbara (1987). From the Inside Out: Afro-American Women's Literary Tradition and the State. Minneapolis, Minnesota: Center for Humanistic Studies, University of Minnesota. OCLC 15696270.
- Christian, Barbara (1987). Alice Walker's 'The Color Purple' and Other Works: A Critical Commentary. New York, New York: Simon & Schuster. ISBN 978-0-671-64861-9.
- Christian, Barbara (Spring 1987). "The Race for Theory". Cultural Critique. 6: The Nature and Context of Minority Discourse (6). Minneapolis, Minnesota: University of Minnesota Press: 51–63. doi:10.2307/1354255. ISSN 0882-4371. JSTOR 1354255. S2CID 147505328.
