= Gerald Barrax =

American writer (1933–2019)

- Born: Gerald William Barrax; June 21, 1933; Attalla, Alabama, U.S.
- Died: December 7, 2019 (aged 86); Raleigh, North Carolina, U.S.
- Education: Duquesne University, University of Pittsburgh

Gerald William Barrax (June 21, 1933 – December 7, 2019) was an American poet and educator.

His poems appeared in numerous anthologies and journals. He was recognized by several awards, including the Raleigh Medal of Arts for "Extraordinary Achievement in the Arts" in 1993, the Sam Regan Award for contribution to the fine arts in North Carolina in 1991, and the 1983 Callaloo Creative Writing Award for Nonfiction Prose.

Barrax served as a professor of English and creative writing at North Carolina State University.

== Biography ==
Barrax was born in Attalla, Alabama, on June 21, 1933. Barrax spent his early years in the rural South before moving with his family to Pittsburgh in 1944. Barrax began to write poetry when he was 18. Barrax was introduced to poetry by his then peer Ellen. The two would often exchange poetry and read it to each other.

After graduating in 1951 Barrax went to work for one year at the U.S. Steel Company in Homestead to fund his college education. During his time at the Mill Barrax would meet a former ex-convict named Eddie. Eddie introduced Barrax to a book titled 'This is my Beloved" by Walter Benton. Barrax would take inspiration from Benton's work in his own poems.

Barrax then went to college for one year but had to unroll because he run out of money. He then joined the Air Force in order to get the GI Bill to finance the rest of his higher education. In 1954 Barrax was stationed in Greenville, South Carolina at Donaldson Air Force Base in 1954. While there Barrax came across "Poets' Handbook" by Clement Wood. This handbook helped Barrax discover meter, scansion, assonance, and much more.

Barrax earned a bachelor's degree at Duquesne University, and a master's degree in English from the University of Pittsburgh in 1969. After the completion of his master's program, Barrax moved to North Carolina, where he joined the faculty of North Carolina State University in 1970.

In a 2009 documentary produced by the North Carolina Department of Natural and Cultural Resources, Barrax said that he was the first black teacher at North Carolina State University. He retired from teaching in 1997.

In 2009, Barrax was awarded the North Carolina Award for Literature.

Barrax was struck and killed by the driver of a vehicle on December 7, 2019, in southeast Raleigh, North Carolina. He was 86 at the time of his death. The driver allegedly did not yield to Barrax in a pedestrian crosswalk, fatally hitting him. Barrax died after he was rushed for treatment to WakeMed Hospital after suffering critical injuries.

== Works ==
Barrax published these books of poetry:

- 1970: Another Kind of Rain,
- 1980: An Audience of One : Poems
- 1987: The Deaths of Animals and Lesser Gods, Vol. 4
- 1992: Leaning against the Sun, nominated for both the Pulitzer Prize and the National Book Award.
- 1998: From a Person Sitting in Darkness : New and Selected Poems
