= Sarah E. Wright =

American writer (1928–2009)

Sarah Elizabeth Wright (December 9, 1928 – September 13, 2009) was an American writer and social activist. Her novel This Child's Gonna Live, published in 1969, was acclaimed by critics and "was among the first to focus on the confluence of race, class and sex". The New York Times named it "outstanding book of 1969" and it was called a "small masterpiece".

== Biography ==
Sarah Elizabeth Wright was born in Wetipquin, Maryland, and began writing poetry at the age of eight. She attended Salisbury Colored High School, and in 1945 entered Howard University. At Howard University, she was mentored by Sterling Allen Brown and Owen Dodson, and first met poet Langston Hughes, who became a lifelong friend.

In 1949, due to financial hardship, Wright left Howard University without graduating and moved to Philadelphia. There she wrote, worked for a small printing and publishing firm, and helped to found the Philadelphia Writers' Workshop. In 1957, she moved to New York City and joined the Harlem Writers Guild, of which she served as a vice-president, and was involved in many political causes, including African and African-American liberation, as well as anti-war work. In July 1960 she travelled to Cuba in a trip organized by the Fair Play for Cuba Committee. With her acclaimed novel This Child's Gonna Live appearing in 1969, she is considered part of the Black Arts Movement.

Wright died in Manhattan, New York, at the age of 80, as the result of complications of cancer.

== Works ==
This Child's Gonna Live (Delacorte Press, 1969) was her only published novel. The New York Times named it an outstanding book of 1969. Told from the perspective of Mariah Upshur, a young woman living in a small fishing village in Maryland, the book depicts the struggle to survive under the multiple pressures of racism, poverty, and disease. The Feminist Press published a new edition of the novel in 1986 and it has remained in print since then.

Wright spent many years working on a second novel, which was never completed. She also published critical essays, a volume of poetry entitled Give Me a Child (Kraft Publishing, 1955, with Lucy Smith); and a nonfiction book for young people, A. Philip Randolph: Integration in the Workplace (Silver Burdett, 1990). Wright's novel is featured in the exhibit concerning the Eastern Shore of Maryland in the African-American Museum of History and Culture.

== Bibliography ==
=== Books ===
- Sarah E. Wright, Lucy Smith: Give Me a Child. Kraft Publishing Co., 1955 (poetry).
- This Child's Gonna Live. Delacorte Press, 1969. ISBN 1-55861-397-8
- Black Art History: A Curriculum for Middle School. California State University, 1976.
- A. Philip Randolph: Integration in the Workplace. Silver Burdett Press, 1990. ISBN 0-382-09922-2

=== Other publications ===
- "I Have Known Death", Tomorrow, 10 (November 3, 1950), p. 46.
- "Roadblocks to the Development of the Negro Writer," in The American Negro Writer and His Roots, selected papers from the First Conference of American Negro Writers. New York: American Society of African Culture, 1960, pp. 71–73.
- "Until They Have Stopped", Freedomways, 5, no. 3 (1965), pp. 378–379.
- "The Negro Woman in American Literature," Freedomways, 6 (Winter 1966), pp. 8–10.
- "Urgency" and "Window Pictures", in Rosey E. Pool (ed.), Beyond the Blues, Detroit: Broadside Press, 1971, pp. 184–185.
- "Lament of a Harlem Mother", American Pen, 4 (Spring 1972), pp. 23–27.
- "Black Writers' Views of America", Freedomways, 19, no. 3 (1979), pp. 161–163.
