= Larry Neal =

American scholar of theater (1937– 1981)

- Born: Lawrence Paul Neal; September 5, 1937; Atlanta, Georgia, U.S.
- Died: January 6, 1981 (aged 43); Hamilton, New York, U.S.
- Education: Lincoln University (Pennsylvania), University of Pennsylvania
- Occupations: Writer, poet, critic and academic
- Spouse: Evelyn Rodgers (m. 1965)
- Scientific career
- Workplaces: City College of New York. Wesleyan University. Yale University

Larry Neal or Lawrence Neal (September 5, 1937 – January 6, 1981) was an American writer, poet, critic and academic. He was a notable scholar of African-American theater, well known for his contributions to the Black Arts Movement of the 1960s and 1970s. He was a major influence in both New York and Chicago, pushing for black culture to focus less on integration with White culture, rather than celebrating its differences within an equally important and meaningful artistic and political field, thus celebrating Black heritage.

== Biography ==
Neal was born in Atlanta, Georgia, to Woodie and Maggie Neal, who had five sons. Neal's parents had a strong influence on his later works. His father had less than a high school education but was "exceptionally well-read" and his mother instilled in him a love of the arts. He graduated from Roman Catholic High School in Philadelphia in 1956. He later graduated from Lincoln University (Pennsylvania) in 1961 with a degree in history and English, and then received a master's degree in 1963 from the University of Pennsylvania in Folklore (which became a major subject of many of his later works). In 1963, Neal was a professor for Drexel Institute of Technology in Philadelphia for a brief period, before landing a job in New York as a copywriter in 1964 for Wiley and Sons.

From 1968 to 1969, Neal taught at the City College of New York. The following year he taught at Wesleyan University, and then at Yale University from 1970 to 1975. During his time at Yale, he won a Guggenheim Fellowship for African-American critical studies.

Neal is known for working with Amiri Baraka to open the Black Arts Repertory Theatre/School. His early writings—including "The Negro in the Theatre" (1964), "Cultural Front" (1965), and "The Black Arts Movement" (1968)—were influential in defining and describing the role of the arts in the Black Power era. Additionally, he became the arts editor of the Liberator magazine (1964–69), educational director of the Black Panther Party, and was a member of the Revolutionary Action Movement. During this time, Neal became more involved in radical black politics and spent more time with Baraka and the Black Liberation movement (774). His time as an arts editor allowed him to interview some of the most influential black artists, musicians, and writers, which only increased his involvement and influence in the Black Arts Movement.

His essays and poems appeared in publications such as Liberator, Drama Critique, Soulbook, Black Theatre, Negro Digest, Performance, and Black World (for which he was either a founder, editor and/or a contributor). He wrote and produced two major plays, The Glorious Monster in the Bell of the Horn (1976) and In an Upstate Motel (1981). The Glorious Monster was described by a critic as "lyric drama, a poetic interpretation of the hopes and aspirations of black artists and the middle class". Neal's essays dealt with social issues, aesthetic theory, literary topics, while his poetry focused more on African-American mythology, history, and language. He also uncovered Ed Bullins's plagiarism of Albert Camus's 1949 play The Just Assassins. One of Neal's most famous and defining works was the essay "The Black Arts Movement", which addressed the need to be "radically opposed to any concept of the artist that alienates him from his community". This work addressed the "Black aesthetic" and the need to reject a "white aesthetic", symbolically representing the essence of Neal's message as a leader in the Black Arts movement.

At Howard University in Washington D.C., Neal held the Andrew W. Mellon Chair in humanities. During 1976–79, he was the Executive Director for the District of Columbia Commission on the Arts and Humanities. This organization helped with grants to further the arts in black communities.

== Family ==
In 1965, Neal married Evelyn Rodgers, a chemist; they had one adopted son, Avatar.

Neal died from a heart attack on January 6, 1981, aged 43, at a theater workshop in Hamilton, New York. Information on his life and career can be found at the Schomburg Center for Research in Black Culture, which is a section of the New York Public Library.

== Works ==
- Black Boogaloo: Notes on Black Liberation (poetry) (1969)
- Introductions to Zora Neale Hurston's autobiography, Dust Tracks on a Road, and her novel Jonah's Gourd Vine (1971).
- Moving On Up (screenplay) (1973)
- Hoodoo Hollerin' Bebop Ghosts (poetry) (1974)
- The Glorious Monster in the Bell of the Horn (play) (1979)
- In an Upstate Motel: A Morality Play (play) (1980)
- Visions of a Liberated Future: Black Arts Movement Writings. Edited by Michael Schwartz; with commentary by Amiri Baraka, Stanley Crouch, Charles Fuller, and Jayne Cortez (essays) (1989)

=== As editor or contributor ===
- Black Fire: An Anthology of Afro-American Writing (co-editor, with Amiri Baraka) (1968)
- Trippin': A Need for Change (co-author, with Amiri Baraka and A. B. Spellman) (1969)
