= Lennox Raphael =

Trinidad and Tobago journalist (1939–2023)

- Born: September 17, 1939; Trinidad, West Indies
- Died: November 27, 2023 (aged 84); Jægerspris, Denmark
- Occupations: Journalist, poet, playwright
- Writing career
- Notable work: Che!

Lennox Raphael (September 17, 1939 – November 27, 2023) was a Trinidadian journalist, poet, and playwright. His writings have been published in Negro Digest, American Dialog, New Black Poetry, Natural Process and Freedomways.

== Biography ==
Raphael worked as a reporter in Jamaica before first coming to the United States as a U.N. correspondent. He also became a staff writer for the underground newspaper the East Village Other, and an editor of Umbra, a poetry journal based in New York. In 1969 Raphael worked as a writer in the schools with the Teachers & Writers Collaborative at P.S. 26 in Brooklyn, New York.

=== Journalism ===
In his journalism Raphael has explored the relationship between black West Indian immigrants to the United States and the longer established African-American community. He points out that, in the 1960s, although there was a need for West Indian immigrants to show solidarity with African Americans, many of those immigrants felt themselves to be superior to American-born blacks.

=== Theatre ===
Raphael's best-known play is Che!, which presents Che Guevara as a hero who was the object of sexually motivated envy by his enemies, including the President of the United States. The play featured scenes of nudity and explicit sex, and, soon after it opened in New York City in 1969, was closed by the Public Morals Police Squad of New York City, with Raphael being arrested along with the actors and director. It reopened after a judge ruled that the play was protected by the free speech provisions of the First Amendment to the United States Constitution. In February 1970 the Manhattan Criminal Court found Raphael, along with the cast, producer and set designer, "guilty beyond any reasonable doubt of participating in an obscene performance which predominantly appealed and pandered to prurient interest and went beyond the customary limits of candor in presenting profanity, filth, defecation, masochism, sadism, masturbation, nudity, copulation, sodomy and other deviate sexual intercourse".

Raphael's next play, Blue Soap, avoided such problems by restricting any sexual content to the dialogue.

Raphael died on November 17, 2023, at the age of 84.
