= Harold Cruse =

American academic (1916–2005)

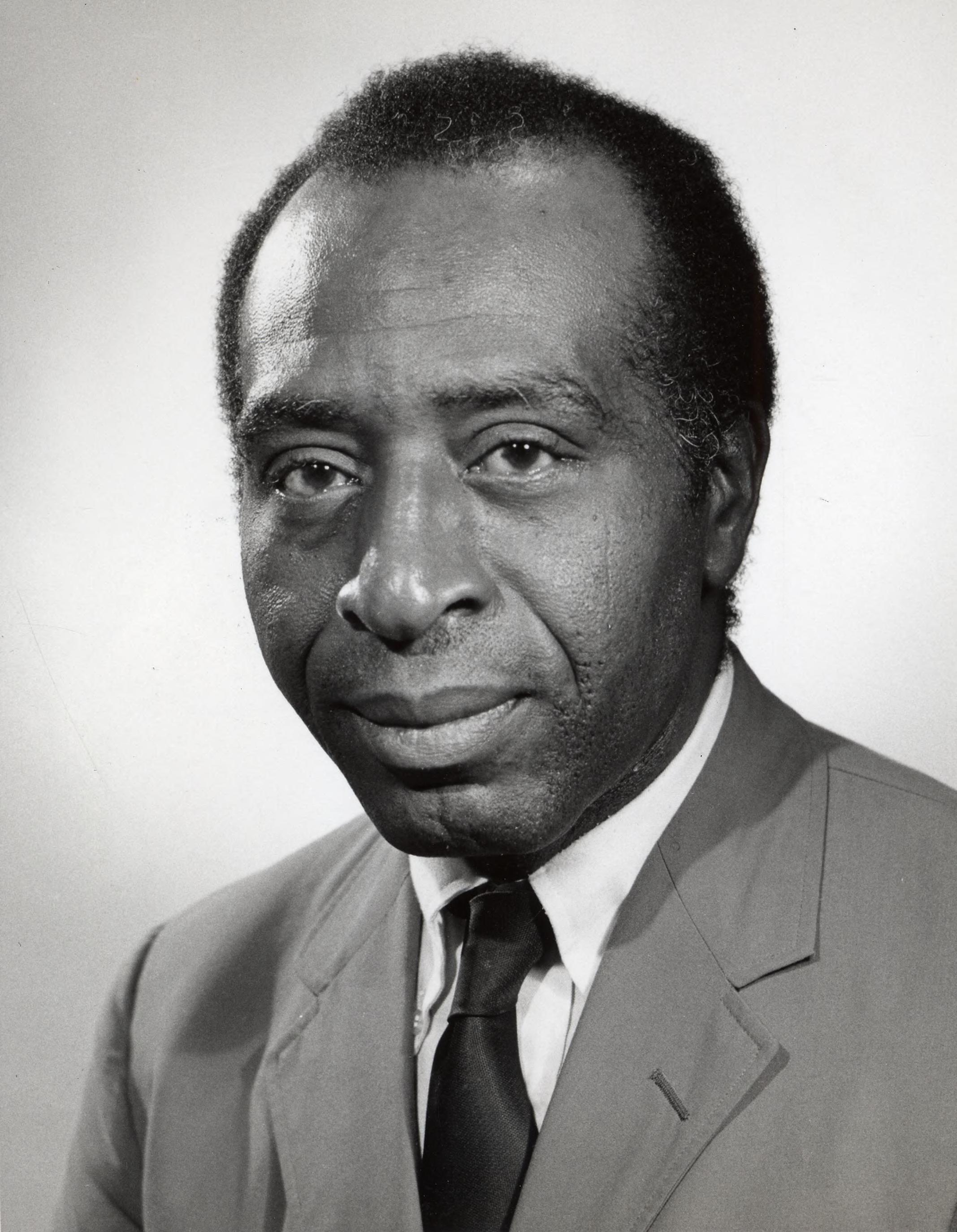
- Born: March 8, 1916; Petersburg, Virginia, U.S.
- Died: March 26, 2005 (aged 89); Ann Arbor, Michigan, U.S.
- Education: City College of New York (did not graduate)
- Occupation: Academic
- Employer: University of Michigan
- Known for: The Crisis of the Negro Intellectual (1967)

Harold Wright Cruse (March 8, 1916 – March 26, 2005) was an American academic who was a social critic and teacher of African American studies at the University of Michigan until the mid-1980s. The Crisis of the Negro Intellectual (1967) is his best-known book.

== Biography ==
=== Early life ===
Harold Cruse was born March 8, 1916, in Petersburg, Virginia. His father was a railway porter. After his parents divorced, Cruse moved to New York City, New York. He became interested in the arts as a young man, thanks in large measure to his close relationship with an aunt who often took him to shows on the weekend. During World War II, Cruse joined the U.S. Army and served in Europe and North Africa. Upon returning home, he attended the City College of New York without graduating.

In 1947, Cruse joined the Communist Party, in which he was active for several years. Citing a 1956 FBI document obtained through the Freedom of Information Act, Washington University in St. Louis Associate Professor of English and African-American Studies William J. Maxwell notes that Cruse was "recruited as an undercover Communist Party informant (he proved willing to name names of onetime co-members, but nothing more)."

=== Theater career ===
Cruse viewed the arts scene as a white-dominated misrepresentation of black culture, epitomized by George Gershwin's folk opera Porgy and Bess and Lorraine Hansberry's play A Raisin in the Sun.

=== Views ===
Many believed that Cruse was an opponent of integration, which he referred to as "assimilation," because its policies were only geared towards integrating blacks into white society and not whites into black; thereby betraying an inherent unacceptability of blackness in mainstream America. But in reality Cruse simply believed that in a pluralistic society, any group must amass and control its own political, economic and cultural capital before true integration was possible. Without group self-determination, any group, but particularly American blacks, would rely on the willingness of other groups with political, economic and cultural capital to voluntarily integrate with blacks, which would lead to the dismantlement of black institutions and cultural traditions rather than facilitate an equal and negotiated sharing throughout society.

While Cruse was very critical of American society, he reserved the bulk of his criticism for black intellectuals and leaders who he believed did not have the academic appetite to master the various disciplines necessary to advocate for real and effective societal change.

In The Crisis of the Negro Intellectual (1967), Cruse sharply criticized white American society and its cultural establishment. He described the white middle class as "commercially depraved," accusing it of transforming Americans into a "nation of intellectual dolts." He further characterized white America as a "nation of sheep" that was "overfed, overdeveloped, overprivileged (but culturally pauperized)." Cruse also criticized what he regarded as the dominance of white Anglo-Saxon Protestant cultural ideals, arguing that they had obstructed the development of genuine cultural pluralism in the United States.

On the first anniversary of the Cuban Revolution a group of black civil rights activists, composed of Cruse, Amiri Baraka, Julian Mayfield and John Henrik Clarke, travelled to Havana in a trip organised by the Fair Play for Cuba Committee.

=== Academic life ===
After publishing The Crisis of the Negro Intellectual in 1967, he was invited to lecture at the University of Michigan (1968) and taught in the African-American Studies program at the Center for Afro-American and African Studies there until the mid-1980s. Cruse was one of the first African-American studies professors, becoming one of the first to earn tenure without holding a college degree.

A theme of The Crisis of the Negro Intellectual is that intellectuals must play a central role in movements for radical change. This idea re-appeared in Cruse's other works including Rebellion or Revolution, a compilation of essays, and Plural But Equal.

=== Reception ===
In 1969, Christopher Lasch praised The Crisis of the Negro Intellectual as "one of the landmarks of social criticism in the twentieth century." Some reviewers (Michael Thelwell, Vincent Harding) criticized Cruse's geographic focus on Harlem intellectuals. Cruse has been accused of antisemitism for his analysis of Black-Jewish relations in that book, in which he argued that "the great brainwashing of Negro radical intellectuals was not achieved by capitalism, or the capitalistic bourgeoisie, but by Jewish intellectuals in the American Communist Party."

=== Death and legacy ===
On March 26, 2005, Cruse died from congestive heart failure while living in an assisted-living facility in Ann Arbor, Michigan. He was survived by his partner of 36 years, Mara Julius.

== Works ==
- Cruse, Harold (2009). Rebellion or Revolution?. Minneapolis: University of Minnesota Press. ISBN 9780816668038. JSTOR 10.5749/j.ctttsnv0.
- The Crisis of the Negro Intellectual: A Historical Analysis of the Failure of Black Leadership. New York: NYRB Classics. 2005. ISBN 9781590171356. OL 3300466M.
- Plural but Equal: A Critical Study of Blacks and Minorities and America's Plural Society. New York: William Morrow. 1987. ISBN 0688044867.
- Cobb, William Jelani, ed. (2002). The Essential Harold Cruse: A Reader. Foreword by Stanley Crouch. New York: Palgrave. ISBN 9780312293963.
