= Angela Jackson =

American poet (born 1951)

- Born: July 25, 1951 (age 75); Greenville, Mississippi, U.S.
- Education: Northwestern University (BA); University of Chicago (MA)
- Occupations: Poet; playwright; novelist
- Known for: Poet Laureate of Illinois
- Awards: Conrad Kent Rivers Memorial Award; American Book Award; Pushcart Prize; Ruth Lilly Poetry Prize

Angela Jackson (born July 25, 1951) is an American poet, playwright, and novelist based in Chicago, Illinois. Jackson has been a member of the Organization of Black American Culture (OBAC), a community that fosters the intellectual development of Black creators, since 1970. She has held teaching positions at Kennedy-King College, Columbia College Chicago, Framingham State University, and Howard University. Jackson has won numerous awards, including the American Book Award, and became the fifth Illinois Poet Laureate in 2020.

== Biography ==
=== Childhood/early life ===
Angela Jackson was born in Greenville, Mississippi, the fifth of nine children. She grew up in the Englewood neighborhood on the South Side of Chicago, where her father, George Jackson Sr., and mother, Angeline Robinson Jackson, moved during the Great Migration. She was raised as a Catholic. As a child, Jackson regularly read books from Chicago's Hiram Kelly Branch library. Jackson claims that she aspired to be a poet since before she was ten years old.

=== Education ===
Jackson attended St. Anne's School, a Catholic elementary school. Here, Jackson skipped fourth and fifth grade. She graduated third in her high school class at Loretto Academy in 1968. Jackson was accepted into Northwestern University with a scholarship to pursue pre-medical studies.

At Northwestern, Jackson joined a Black student group called For Members Only (FMO), which exposed her to different art forms by Black students and professionals. Her membership in the FMO caused her to join the Organization of Black American Culture (OBAC) with young black writers such as Haki Madhubuti (Don L. Lee), Carolyn Rodgers, and Sterling Plumpp in 1970. This organization, created in 1967, fosters the development of Black Arts while promoting pride in Black heritage. She worked as an editor of Nommo, the OBAC's journal publication. It was during Jackson's time at Northwestern that she decided not to pursue a medical career but, instead, a writing career. Jackson published her first book of poetry, Voodoo Love Magic, in 1974 as an undergraduate student. She won an Academy of American Poets Award from Northwestern in 1974.

In 1977, Jackson graduated with a B.A. in English and American Literature from Northwestern. She graduated from the University of Chicago in 1995 with an M.A. in Latin American and Caribbean studies.

=== Career ===
Jackson continued as a member of the OBAC after graduating from Northwestern and served as the organization's coordinator from 1976 to 1990.

Jackson uses poetry as a form of resistance to social injustices. She focuses on the importance of racial equality in her poems and other works. Her writing also deals with other societal matters, such as homelessness, sexuality, and language. Jackson believes that poetry can be used to call on people and systems of oppression to create change for a more equitable society.

Although Jackson is best known for her poetry, she worked with other forms of writing, such as short stories and plays, in the 1970s and 1980s.

Jackson, aside from her writing career, has held teaching positions at Kennedy-King College in Illinois, Columbia College Chicago in Illinois, Framingham State University in Massachusetts, and Howard University in Washington D.C., acting as a mentor for young writers.

==== Influences ====
Jackson has had several influences on her writing career. In Jackson's time as an undergraduate student, poet Mari Evans mentored her. Other members of the OBAC had a positive impact on Jackson's writing. Hoyt W. Fuller, who preceded Jackson as coordinator of the OBAC, had an especially essential role in Jackson's development as a poet; Jackson even dedicated her first book of poetry, Voodoo Love Magic, to him, along with other OBAC participants and her family.

== Reception ==
Jackson has received praise from various people, including critic D.L. Smith, who claims that her work is “technically deft, densely metaphorical, and constantly inventive.” Another reviewer, Donna Seaman, in TriQuarterly, asserts that Jackson writes with “a tender radiance” when discussing racial inequalities. During the announcement that Jackson was selected as the 2020 Illinois Poet Laureate, the previous Poet Laureate, Kevin Stein, affirmed that Jackson's “lines bristle with the melody of conversation and soulful blues.” Poet C.T. Salazar classifies Jackson's poetry collection, More Than Meat and Raiment, as “a work of poetic excellence.”

== Awards and accolades ==
Jackson has won various awards for her writing.

- 1973: Conrad Kent Rivers Memorial Award
- 1974: Academy of American Poets Award from Northwestern University
- 1979: Illinois Art Council Creative Writing Fellowship in Fiction
- 1980: National Endowment For the Arts Creative Writing Fellowship in Fiction
- 1984: Hoyt W. Fuller Award for Literary Excellence
- 1985: American Book Award
- 1984: DuSable Museum Writers Seminar Poetry Prize
- 1984: Pushcart Prize for Poetry
- 1989: ETA Gala Award
- 1996: Illinois Authors Literary Heritage Award
- 2000: Illinois Art Council Creative Writing Fellowship in Playwriting
- 2002: Shelley Memorial Award of the Poetry Society of America
- 2008: American Book Award
- 2018: The John Gardner Fiction Prize
- 2020: Illinois Poet Laureate
- 2022: Ruth Lilly Poetry Prize winner

=== Additional awards ===
- The Carl Sandburg Award
- Chicago Literary Hall of Fame Fuller Award
- Chicago Sun-Times Friends of Literature Book of the Year Award
- Six Illinois Arts Council Literary Awards, five for fiction and one for poetry
- Illinois Center for the Book Heritage Award
- Literary Hall of Fame for Writers of African Descent from Chicago State University
- National Endowment for the Arts and the Illinois Arts Council Awards
- TriQuarterly's Daniel Curley Award

== Works ==
While Jackson has received the most praise for her poetry, she has also published other forms of writing, such as plays, novels, and a memoir.

=== Poetry ===
- Voodoo Love Magic, 1974
- The Greenville Club, 1977
- Solo in the Boxcar Third Floor, 1985
- The Man with the White Liver, 1987
- Dark Legs and Silk Kisses: The Beatitudes of the Spinners, 1993
- And All These Roads Be Luminous: Poems New and Selected, 1997
- It Seems Like a Mighty Long Time, 2015
- More Than Meat and Raiment, 2022

=== Plays ===
- Witness!, 1970
- Shango Diaspora: An African American Myth of Womanhood and Love, 1980
- Comfort Stew, 1984 (Also known as When the Wind Blows)

=== Novels ===
- Treemont Stone, 1984
- Where I Must Go, 2009
- Roads, Where There Are No Roads, 2017

=== Memoir ===
- Apprenticeship in the House of Cowrie Shells
