= Mae Jackson (poet) =

African-American poet and activist (born 1946)

- Born: January 3, 1946 (age 80); Earle, Arkansas, U.S.
- Education: New School for Social Research
- Occupations: Poet; activist

Mae Jackson (born January 3, 1946) is an African-American poet and activist.

== Life ==
Jackson was born in Earle, Arkansas, on January 3, 1946. Gowing up in New Orleans, she became an activist at an early age. Aged 11, she joined an NAACP boycott of New Orleans variety stores. Her family later moved to Brooklyn, and she worked for the Brooklyn chapter of the Congress of Racial Equality (CORE). She was expelled from her high school, Sarah J. Hale Vocational High School in Brooklyn, after her conversion to Islam, and was absent at her high school graduation two weeks later, attending a demonstration.

Jackson studied at the New School for Social Research in 1966–67, and worked as a national staff member of the Student Nonviolent Coordinating Committee (SNCC). She helped to organize the Black Women's Liberation Committee in January 1969.

Jackson's first published work was a short story, "I Remember Omar", published in Negro Digest in June 1969. Her collection Can I Poet With You, appeared in 1969 and was awarded the 1970 Conrad Kent Rivers Memorial Award by Negro Digest magazine (renamed Black World that year). She was published by Dudley Randall's Broadside Press. Her poetry was anthologised in Black Spirits (1971), Black Out Loud (1971) and The Poetry of Black America (1974) She has written for newspapers and magazines including Black World, Essence, Black Creation, and Black Scholar.

In the early 1970s Jackson moved into teaching, first as a substitute nursery and kindergarten teacher and then teaching creative writing in junior high school. She was a member of the Brewery Puppet Troupe in 1974–75, and took part in the Negro Ensemble Company Playwrights Workshop. In 1975 she became a court social worker at Brooklyn Family Court. She has also worked as an instructor at Cell Block Theatre, Bronx Men's House of Detention, Queens Men's House of Detention, Metropolitan Correctional Facilities, Loft Film and Theatre Center, and South Jamaica Senior Citizens Center.

== Works ==
=== Poetry ===
- Can I Poet With You. (New York: Published by Black Dialogue Publishers / Printed by Afro-Arts, 1969. Introduction by Nikki Giovanni.

=== Children's Plays ===
- The Harriet Tubman Story
- When Kawanza Comes
- The Jackson Five Meets Malcolm X
- When I Grow Up I Want to Be...
