= Carol D. Lee =

American professor

- Born: August 26, 1945 (age 81)
- Occupations: Education researcher, professor emeritus
- Spouse: Haki R. Madhubuti
- Awards: American Association of Colleges for Teacher Education Lifetime Achievement Award; American Educational Research Association Scholars of Color Distinguished Scholar Award

Academic background
- Education: University of Illinois at Urbana-Champaign (BA); University of Chicago (MA, PhD)

Carol Diane Lee (née Easton, also Safisha Madhubuti) is an American professor, educational researcher, school director, and author. Now retired, Lee was the Edwina S. Tarry Professor of Education and Social Policy, Professor of Learning Sciences, and Professor of African-American Studies at Northwestern University. Her scholarly interests focus on the influences of culture and literacy on education, particularly among students in the African-American community. She chairs the Board of Directors of the Betty Shabbazz International Charter School, an institution she helped found.

Lee has been nationally recognized and honored by numerous organizations for her years of service, mentorship, and social activism, including the American Association of Colleges for Teacher Education (AACTE), the American Educational Research Association (AERA), the Federation of Associations in Behavioral & Brain Sciences (FABBS), the National Academy of Education (NAE), and the American Academy of Arts and Sciences (AAAS). She has also garnered international recognition, having been awarded an honorary doctorate from the University of Pretoria and having twice led the American delegation of the People to People Student Ambassador Program to South Africa and China.

Lee is the author of Culture, Literacy and Learning: Taking Bloom in the Midst of the Whirlwind and Signifying As a Scaffold for Literary Interpretation: The Pedagogical Implications of an African American Discourse Genre. With Peter Smagorinsky, Lee edited Vygotskian Perspectives on Literacy Research: Constructing Meaning Through Collaborative Inquiry.

== Biography ==
Lee was born on August 26, 1945. She grew up in Chicago, attended Chicago Public Schools, and graduated from Crane High School. She spent her freshman year at Illinois Wesleyan University, then transferred to the University of Illinois Urbana-Champaign, where she stayed for the remainder of her undergraduate tenure, graduating with a Bachelor of Arts in the Teaching of Secondary School English in 1966. She obtained her Master of Arts in English in 1969 at the University of Chicago, and returned there to complete her Ph.D. in Education (Curriculum & Instruction) in 1991.

After earning her bachelor's degree, Lee taught English at Englewood High School and later at Kennedy-King College, both in Chicago. Around that time, she became socially active in the Black Arts Movement, meeting and eventually marrying Haki Madhubuti (born Don L. Lee). Together, they founded the New Concept Development Center, an African-centered school, in 1972, the progenitor of the Betty Shabazz International Charter School network and the pre-kindergarten New Concept School.

In 1991, after finishing her doctorate at the University of Chicago and completing 16 years of service at the New Concept School, Lee joined the faculty at Northwestern University in the School of Education and Public Policy. In 2018, she retired as the Edwina S. Tarry Professor of Education and Social Policy.

== Research ==
Lee is known for her efforts to develop culturally responsive educational systems that use students' knowledge from their daily lives to support their academic learning and development in school settings. Lee's theory of "cultural modeling" is based on the concept that individual learning is inextricably linked to one's interactions and relationships in a culturally dynamic society; therefore, social knowledge can serve as a pedagogical bridge. Lee's approach to pedagogy shares common origins with cultural-historical activity theory, developed by Lee's contemporaries Yrjö Engeström and Michael Cole.

Lee's professional roots as an English teacher and her personal social awakening during the Black Arts Movement feature prominently in cultural modeling, where a strong focus on reading, literary study, and linguistics and a full embrace of one's social background and cultural history are fundamental. The scholarly works of African-American linguists Lorenzo Dow Turner, Geneva Smitherman, and Henry-Louis Gates, Jr. informed Lee's integration of African-American Vernacular English into her pedagogical approach in which she uses the act of signifying and other cultural and traditional elements central to the lives and experiences of inner-city African-American students to scaffold instruction of complex, formal literature. In one of its earliest experimental applications, Lee used cultural modeling to help students, initially described as low-skilled and unmotivated, become enthusiastic readers capable of analyzing critical novels by African-American writers, such as Their Eyes Were Watching God by Zora Neale Hurston and The Color Purple by Alice Walker.

Cultural modeling has inspired research and adoption in other cultural contexts, particularly among immigrant and other non-dominant communities across the United States and around the world. Lee's approach is still used where it was first implemented, at the New Concept School and Betty Shabbazz International Charter Schools which she helped found.

== Selected publications ==
- Lee, Carol D. (1995). "A culturally based cognitive apprenticeship: Teaching African American high school students skills in literary interpretation". Reading Research Quarterly, 30(4), 608–630.
- Lee, Carol D. (2001). "Is October Brown Chinese? A cultural modeling activity system for underachieving students". American Educational Research Journal, 38(1), 97–141.
- Lee, Carol D. (2003). "Toward a framework for culturally responsive design in multimedia computer environments: Cultural modeling as a case". Mind, Culture, and Activity, 10(1), 42–61.
- Lee, Carol D. (2008). "The centrality of culture to the scientific study of learning and development: How an ecological framework in education research facilitates civic responsibility". Educational Researcher, 37(5), 267–279.
- Lee, Carol D., & Anika Spratley (2010). Reading in the disciplines: The challenges of adolescent literacy. Final report from Carnegie Corporation of New York's Council on Advancing Adolescent Literacy.
- Nasir, Na'ilah Suad, Ann S. Rosebery, Beth Warren, & Carol D. Lee (2006). "Learning as a cultural process: Achieving equity through diversity". In R. Keith Sawyer (ed.), The Cambridge Handbook of the Learning Sciences (pp. 489–504). Cambridge University Press.
