= Leaonead Pack Drain-Bailey =

American librarian and bibliographer

- Born: January 28, 1906; Summers County, West Virginia
- Died: March 29, 1983 (aged 77); Detroit, Michigan
- Other name: Leaonead P. Drain
- Occupation: librarian

Leaonead Justine Pack Drain-Bailey (January 28, 1906 – March 29, 1983) was an American librarian and educator, the former Head of Library at West Virginia State University from 1949 through 1956. The Drain-Jordan Library which opened in 1951 and which she helped plan, is named in honor of her and Lawrence Victor Jordan.

== Career ==
Drain-Bailey graduated from West Virginia Collegiate Institute in 1927 and worked there after graduation as associate librarian and assistant professor in Library Science, becoming head librarian in 1949. She earned a B.S. in Library Science from the University of Illinois in 1929 and attended the School of Library Service at Columbia University in the summer of 1950. While at WVSU she compiled bibliographies and published research including a survey of library fine and repayment levels among 37 colleges serving Black students.

She left WVSU in 1956 and moved to St. Louis, Missouri where she became head of the reference department at Saint Louis University Library. A second move took her to Detroit where she worked in the reference department of the University of Detroit library before her retirement in 1971.

After her retirement from the library, she published Broadside authors and artists; an illustrated biographical directory which she compiled and edited. This book grew out of an association with Dudley Randall, a University of Detroit colleague, who owned Broadside Press. Randall was frequently asked for biographical information about the people published by him and was often unable to supply any because the Black authors and poets he published were not covered in traditional reference sources. Bailey created, distributed, and compiled responses to a survey sent to all of Broadside Press's authors and published it in a 136-page volume. 94 per cent of the Americans listed were not in Who's Who in America 1972-1973. Out the 184 entries for authors, 90 per cent were not listed in Contemporary Authors. Library Journal called it a reference work that "should be found in most libraries."

== Personal life ==
Leaonead Pack was born in Institute, West Virginia to Charles Robert Pack and Eva B Brown Pack, one of the town's pioneer families. She married Robert Drain in New York City on August 17, 1931, and they had one son, John Robert Drain. They divorced in 1937. She married Herman Perry Bailey in 1953. She died in 1983 and is buried in the Brown Family Cemetery in Institute, West Virginia.

== Works ==
- Broadside authors and artists: an illustrated biographical directory. Detroit, Mich.: Broadside Press, 1974.
