= Carolyn Rodgers =

American writer

- Born: Carolyn Marie Rodgers; December 14, 1940; Chicago, Illinois
- Died: April 2, 2010 (aged 69); Chicago, Illinois
- Education: Roosevelt University
- Occupation: Writer
- Writing career
- Notable works: Paper Soul (1968); Songs of a Blackbird (1969)

Carolyn Marie Rodgers (December 14, 1940 – April 2, 2010) was a Chicago-based writer, particularly noted for her poetry. The youngest of four, Rodgers had two sisters and a brother, born to Clarence and Bazella Rodgers. Rodgers was also a founder of one of America's oldest and largest black presses, Third World Press. She got her start in the literary circuit as a young woman studying under Pulitzer Prize-winning poet Gwendolyn Brooks in the South Side of Chicago.

Later, Rodgers began writing her own works, which grappled with black identity and culture in the late 1960s. She was a leading voice of the Black Arts Movement (BAM) and the author of eleven books, including How I got Ovah (1975). She was also an essayist and critic, and her work has been described as delivered in a language rooted in a black female perspective that wove strands of feminism, black power, spirituality, and self-consciousness into a sometimes raging, sometimes ruminative search for identity. She also wrote deeply on the subject of mother/daughter relationships, particularly focusing on feminist, matriarchal issues.

== Life and work ==
Born in the Bronzeville neighborhood in the South Side of Chicago, Illinois, Rodgers was encouraged from a young age to pursue music, and learned to play guitar and composed music for much of her life. She kept a journal throughout adolescence in which she explored poetry, but did not take writing seriously until she began college. Rodgers first attended college at the University of Illinois in 1960, but transferred in 1961 to Chicago's Roosevelt University, where she earned her BA degree in 1965. She later earned an MA in English from the University of Chicago in 1980. Rodgers is most well known for her writing contributions to the Black Arts Movement (BAM). Rodgers first became involved in writing during that period while attending Writers Workshops by the Organization of Black American Culture (OBAC), of which she was an active member from 1967 to 1971. The organization sought to promote city involvement and inclusion of the arts in the city of Chicago, which Rodgers was eager to participate in.

She became distinctive as a new black woman poet in the 1960s with the publication of her first two books, Paper Soul and Songs of a Blackbird (Chicago: Third World Press, 1969). Following the national success of Paper Soul, Rodgers was awarded the first Conrad Kent Rivers Memorial Fund Award. Rodgers also won the Poet Laureate Award from the Society of Midland Authors in 1970. She then went on to receive an award from the National Endowment of the Arts, following the publication of Songs of a Blackbird. In 1980, Rodgers won the Carnegie Writer's Grant. She won the Television Gospel Tribute in 1982 and the PEN Grant in 1987.

In 2009, Rodgers was inducted into the International Literary Hall of Fame for Writers of African Descent at the Gwendolyn Brooks Center for Black Literature and Creative Writing. In 2012, Rodgers was inducted into the Chicago Literary Hall of Fame.

== Poetry and poetics ==
Early work

Rodgers's poetry is recognizable for its themes, which included identity, religion, and revolution, and her own use of free verse street slang and concern with feminine issues. In her early days, black revolutionary themes and "cuss words" wove through some poems.

She used slang and heartfelt language to write about love, lust, body image, family, religion, and the grace of human kindness. In her earliest writings such as Paper Soul (1968) and Songs of a Blackbird (1969), her revolutionary ideas about women's roles conflicted with the more traditional ideas of the African-American culture. She was criticized for her use of profanity, which male leaders of BAM found inappropriate for a woman.

Haki R. Madhubuti, chair, publisher and fellow founder of Third World Press, told the Chicago Sun-Times that: "She would take no quarter from insults, or downgrading her writing as a woman ... Her writing could stand by itself."

So while Rodgers's Songs of a Blackbird includes themes about survival, mother-daughter conflicts, and street life, it also criticizes those who dishonor her use of profanity. In her poem "The Last M.F." she fights back:

they say,
that I should not use the word
mothafucka anymo
in my poetry or in any speech I give.
they say,
that I must and can only say it to myself
as the new Black Womanhood suggests
a softer self

In "The Last M.F." Rodgers says she will stop using profanity but continues using the "menacing word" at least 11 times throughout the poem, blatantly making jabs at men and their ideas of how a woman should speak and behave. Here too, Rodgers mocks the new Black Womanhood which she believes, paradoxically, promotes women to be silent.

Later work

Rodgers was a revolutionary influence during the Civil Rights Movement for the black community and oppressed women. She was not afraid to stand up and fight for herself and her people, and she welcomed controversy:

let uh revolution come
state of peace is not known to me
anyway

Her poetry centered on declaring what black people needed to do to overcome their low status in society. She also elocuted that women not stand for the poor treatment they received from men, black or white.

Other volumes of work such as The Heart as Ever Green (1978) and How I Got Ovah (1975) also reflect on feminine issues such as female identity, women's roles in society, and the relationships between mothers and daughters. However, How I Got Ovah exhibits a more crafted tendency than previous books, along with being more autobiographical and transformative. Personal voice pervades the poems of How I Got Ovah. Rodgers develops the individual tone so well that the reader experiences a kinship with the poet and her subject matter (McElroy). The poem "how i got ovah" (from which the book receives its title) serves as an example of this deep personal voice. Rodgers begins an intimate revealing of personal survival with the opening lines:

i can tell you
about them
i have shaken rivers
out of my eyes.

Rodgers carries the reader through experiences of crossing rivers while "eyelash deep," picturing the engulfing of ideas and socially accepted expectations of her as a black woman. She encounters ancestors through nature with their "rich dark root fingers," showing appreciation for her heritage. At the end of the poem, she has found secret strength through staying afloat:

though i shivered
was wet with cold
and wanted to sink down
and float as water, yea--
i can tell you.
i have shaken rivers
out of my eyes.

Estella M. Sales concludes that, in this poem, Rodgers "comes to recognize ... her own inner voice, her ancestral rootedness, her Christian faith, and her parental support". She finds a way to "bridg[e] the separating waters" and "reconcile ... contradictions" in the "seemingly dichotomous entities of black life."

By the 1970s, Rodgers was distilling her language and militant persona into poetry that was deeply concerned with religion, God, and the quest for inner beauty. The change from militant views to more religious views can be seen in her 1975 poem "and when the revolution came." The repetition in the first four verses show a constancy in the black church communities:

and they just kept on going to church
gittin on they knees and praying
and tithing and building and buying

The implied criticism here is that while the militants were busy telling other black people how they should live to improve their lives, the black church communities were busy making black communities better. In stanzas 1–5, Rodgers notes that the militants try to change the hair styles, the dress, any association with whites, the food eaten by blacks, and what the militants termed "white man's religion", According to Friedrike Kaufel, these changes "are petty ones". These changes were quietly and passively resisted by the church members, who continued "going to church" and "tithing and building and praying" Stanzas 6–8 show the militants wanting to build new institutions for black children, and realizing that while the militants were only using words, in the form of orders, to make changes, the churches were actually making needed changes in black neighborhoods. Rodgers shows further implicates the oppressive actions of the militants, and celebrates the communal sanctity of the black church in Stanza 8:

and the church folks said, yeah.
we been waiting fo you militants
to realize that the church is an eternal rock
now why don't you militants jest come on in
we been waitin for you
we can show you how to build
anything that needs building
and while we're on our knees, at that.

In these actions, the church members have long before reached the state of solidarity among themselves that the militants finally call for in Stanza 6.

Another example of Rodgers's turn to more personal and religious matters is her poem "mama's God":

mama's God never was no white man.

her My Jesus, Sweet Jesus never was neither.

the color they had was the color of

her aches and trials, the tribulations of her heart

mama never had no savior that would turn

his back on her because she was black

when mama prayed, she knew who she

was praying to and who she was praying to

didn't and ain't got

no color.

Here Rodgers points once again to the underlying foundation to which African Americans had been clinging even before the Black Arts Movement. By using her mother as the major reference point, the poet establishes these ideas as coming before the militants. Just as the church-goers had already been calling each other brother and sister according to a higher authority, Rodgers perceives an authority to which she can appeal who "ain't got no color". She renders powerless the restrictions placed on her by the color of her skin.

If this cannot be characterized as transformative, nonetheless her work seems to have shifted from a collective black perspective in her early work to an individual one in her later writings. Consequently, by the time she publishes The Heart as Ever Green in 1978, Rodgers is incorporating earlier themes of feminism and human dignity in her poems, along with newer or more pronounced themes of love and Christianity. Some readers and cultural observers do not recognize a break or rupture from Rodgers's past in her later work. For them, Rodgers's spiritual progress in her poetry still brings a radical infusion. Even in her later poetry, we can still break open into a vision uniquely situated in a poetics that remains strident, militant and experimental.

== Fiction and literary criticism ==
Rodgers earned an appreciative and crucial audience through her fiction and literary criticism. Her short stories, which are often overlooked, ultimately suggest themes of survival and adaptability, and are directed to a predominately black audience. Rodgers was successful in providing contemporary black readers with solace and encouragement to persist through her use of well-crafted language. Marsha C. Vick points out some of the reasons why Rodger's fiction was so influential at the time of publication, particularly focusing on her aesthetic appeal:

The same insight and searching analysis that distinguish her poetry are integral to Rodgers's short fiction and her literary criticism. She portrays in her short fiction the ordinary and overlooked people in everyday African American life and emphasizes the theme of survival. Many consider her critical essay "Black Poetry – Where It's At" (1969) to be the best essay on the work of the "new black poets". In it, she aesthetically evaluates contemporary African American poetry and sets up preliminary criteria of appraisal.

According to poet Lorenzo Thomas, Carolyn Rodgers proposed new prosodic categories specific to black poetry. Thomas points out that this kind of essay (or manifesto) outlining a vision statement to spur militant and creative inquiry (but most particularly "Black Poetry – Where It's At") was widely disseminated and discussed among poets of that time. Thomas then goes on to point out that: "Her [Rodgers's] ideas were based on what Jerry W. Ward, Jr., has called "culturally anchored Speech Acts and Reader/Hearer Response." Her position on not only African-Americans' rights, but women's rights, was clear in the content and language in her poems. "She's demonstrably feminine because she's sexy," and her lines in "The Last M.F." show this:

i say,
that i am soft, and you can subpoena my man, put him
on trial, and he will testify that i am
soft in the right places at the right times
and often we are so reserved, i have nothing to say.

Despite recognition for her efforts in the Black Arts Movement, Rodgers' unconventional use of language, especially for a woman, was frowned upon by some of her readers, most notably men. Her consistent use of profanity wasn't seen as "ladylike". Also, she urged her fellow black women to be strong and state clearly what they wanted. She prompted them not to acquiesce to the demands and expectations of white people, but just as important, she made it clear that black women should not be submissive to men in general; "she registers her scorn for black men who censor women."

== Sidelights ==
- In addition to writing poetry, Rodgers wrote numerous short stories. Her play Love was produced Off-Broadway by Woodie King Jr., a father of the Black Theatre movement.
- Rodgers had a career as a teacher and educator, and taught at Columbia College Chicago, University of Washington, Malcolm X Community College, Albany State College, and Indiana University.
- Rodgers was a member of the Organization of Black American Culture (OBAC), which promotes cultural activity of the arts.
- Rodgers also owned her own publishing firm, Eden Press.
- Rodgers was deeply influenced by Hoyt Fuller, the founder of Chicago's OBAC, after meeting him while working as a social worker at the YMCA (1963–69).
- Rodgers worked as a book critic for the Chicago Daily News and as a columnist for the Milwaukee Courier
- In December 1967, Carolyn Rodgers met with Haki R. Madhubuti and Johari Amini in the basement of a South Side apartment to found Third World Press, an outlet for African-American literature. By 2007, the company continues to thrive in a multimillion-dollar facility. Over the years, Rodgers would publish works for friend and Pulitzer Prize–winning author Gwendolyn Brooks, as well as Sonia Sanchez, Sterling Plumpp and Pearl Cleage. Rodgers' work has been quoted by Oprah Winfrey and performed by Ruby Dee and Ossie Davis.
- Was at the forefront of the Civil Rights Movement and served as a great influence for Black Consciousness, sparking "a new generation of African Americans [who questioned] the political relevance of Black Christian organizations, beliefs, and practices."

== Selected publications ==
- Morning Glory: Poems (1989)
- Finite Forms (1985)
- Eden and Other Poems (1983)
- The Heart as Ever Green (1978)
- How I Got Ovah: New and Selected Poems (1975)
- 2 Love Raps (1969)
- Songs of a Blackbird (1969)
- A Statistic, Trying to Make it Home (1969)
- Paper Soul (1968)
- Blackbird in a Cage (1967)

=== Further reading ===
- Bettye J. Parker-Smith, "Running Wild in Her Soul: The Poetry of Carolyn Rodgers", in Mari Evans (ed.), Black Women Writers (1950–1980): A Critical Evaluation, 1984, pp. 393–410.
- Jean Davis, "Carolyn M. Rodgers", in Trudier Harris and Thadious M. Davis (eds), Dictionary of Literary Biography, vol. 41, Afro-American Poets since 1955, 1985, pp. 287–295.
