= Margaret Danner =

American poet

Margaret Danner (January 12, 1915 – January 1, 1984) (Margaret Esse Danner, Margaret Danner Cunningham) was an American poet, editor and cultural activist known for her poetic imagery and her celebration of African heritage and cultural forms.

== Early life and Chicago years ==
Born on January 12, 1915, Margaret Esse Danner came of age in Chicago during the Great Migration. Sources place her birth in Pryorsburg, Kentucky, in 1915, although she adamantly claimed Chicago as her birthplace. In eighth grade, she won first prize in a school contest for "The Violin", a poem describing Stradivarius and Guarnerius violins. Danner's college education included courses at Loyola University, Northwestern University, YMCA College, and the newly founded Roosevelt College. Perhaps equally significant was her education in the African-American cultural community of Chicago's South Side, which in the 1930s and 1940s harbored grassroots cultural institutions and informal circles devoted to politics, education, art and literature and often tied to the Communist Popular Front. Although Danner stayed detached from Communism and would eventually oppose all radical politics, she participated in various South Side groups, including Inez Cunningham Stark's poetry workshop at the South Side Community Art Center, along with Gwendolyn Brooks and Margaret Goss Burroughs, her "sometime friends (and rivals)." In 1946, Danner founded Art Associates to gather and promote Chicago's black writers and poets. She counted as friends the poet and critic Edward Bland, as well as Hoyt Fuller, who would head the revived Negro Digest (later Black World) beginning in 1951.

Danner attracted mentors outside the South Side, including the poets Paul Eagle and Karl Shapiro. She also struck up a correspondence with Langston Hughes that would continue until his death. In 1945, she wrote to Hughes: "My life as a poet looks very bleak to me now.... Only last night I read one of mine and was told it was elusive, ethereal etc. Not much help for my people in that sort of verse." She aimed "to inject some strength" into her work and to train her naturally delicate style to carry forceful messages of African-American pride and racial equality, what she called "the social conscious"

Poems such as "Etta Moten's Attic" and "Africa, Drifting Through Me Sings" demonstrate Danner's growing passion for black African arts, cultures and peoples in the 1940s and 1950s. She looked to National Geographic magazines, anthropology books and American museums for information and images. Professing "the power of the African pull to be stronger than Western Civilization in my psyche," Danner framed many of her poems around encounters with African art objects. She wrote in 1968, "I believe (and have tried for many years to do something positive about this conviction) that the Black should be awakened to his vast beauty."

Danner joined the staff of Poetry: A Magazine of Verse as an editorial assistant in 1951 and in 1956 became the first African American to serve as a Poetry assistant editor. "Far From Africa: Four Poems," which would become one of Danner's most anthologized works, appeared in Poetry in 1951 and earned her a John Hay Whitney fellowship for a trip to Africa, which she delayed until 1966. June M. Aldridge notes that Danner "recall[ed] the association with Poetry as one of the most rewarding experiences of her life." However, by the late 1950s, according to James Edward Smethurst, "Danner's career as a poet seemed to her stalled... perhaps in part due to her proclivity for intense emotional and intellectual crushes on individuals and near-paranoid fears of plots against her career."

Details of Danner's personal life are scarce. She first married Cordell Strickland, with whom she had one child, Naomi. Danner later remarried to Otto Cunningham.

== Detroit years and Boone House ==
Danner moved to Detroit in 1959 to join that city's vibrant community of black writers and artists. She quickly became a part of the "Detroit Group," which included writers such as Danner, Dudley Randall, Oliver LaGrone, Woodie King, Jr., James Thompson and Naomi Long Madgett. In 1962, Danner was named a poet-in-residence at Wayne State University. That same year, Danner talked a local Baptist pastor at King Solomon Baptist Church into lending her an empty parish house to found a cultural center for black writers, artists and musicians. Boone House became the artistic home of the Detroit group from 1962 to 1964 and hosted visitors such as Robert Hayden, Owen Dodson, Fuller and Hughes, who provided crucial support and publicity for several Boone House writers. The Boone House group also benefited from the attention of Rosey Pool, who included Danner and four other Detroit writers in her 1962 anthology Beyond the Blues.

Madgett remembered Boone House as an "old house [that] was beautiful in its details but in poor repair. It lacked central heat, some of the lights did not work, and the toilet lacked a seat, but we were glad to have this meeting place and to huddle together good-naturedly in front of the fireplace in cold weather." According to Randall, "At the Boone House poetry meetings we didn't criticize each other's work. It wasn't a workshop. Instead, we created a poetry community to inspire each other." At Boone House, Danner and Randall collaborated on Poem Counterpoem (1966)—the first book out of Randall's Broadside Press, an important independent black publisher still in operation today.

In 1962 Danner was noted as "a fellow Bahai" in October 1962 in the foreword of her poem Through the Varied Patterned Lace published in the Negro History Bulletin while she lived in Detroit. She joined the Baháʼí Faith, which she shared with Robert Hayden; she was a touring poet sponsored by the Baháʼí Teaching Committee, and shared stories of her experiences promoting the religion.

== Later career ==
In 1966, Danner took her long-desired trip to Africa through the John Hay Whitney Fellowship to join prominent African-American cultural figures at the First World Festival of Negro Arts in Dakar, Senegal. The poem "At Home in Dakar" (also published as "At Home in Africa") recalls this trip.

Danner's enthusiasm for the Black Arts Movement emerging in the mid-1960s apparently "blew hot and cold." She presented the spiritual orientation of the Baháʼí Faith in some of her work. Still, she participated in conferences and readings with younger poets and generally supporting the new literary generation. As Negro Digest acknowledged in 1968, Danner's "poetry long had reflected the now-fashionable 'black is beautiful' philosophy." During terms as poet-in-residence at Virginia Union University in Richmond and LeMoyne-Owen College in Memphis, both historically black institutions, Danner continued her lifelong dedication to young people and edited two anthologies of students' verse.

In the late 1960s and 1970s, Danner published her third and fourth volumes of poetry, Iron Lace (1968) and The Down of a Thistle: Selected Poems, Prose Poems, and Songs (1976). Her work continued to draw upon African (as well as Western) art, flora and fauna, relationships with her fellow poets and scenes from urban life. Several of her poems address or discuss her grandson, Sterling Washington, Jr., whom she calls "Muffin," and who seems to represent an African-American future. Danner continued to be visible promoting her religion.

Margaret Esse Danner died on January 1, 1984, 11 days before her 69th birthday, in Chicago. Her papers are held by the University of Chicago library.

== Reception ==
"A word conjuror and artisan, she provides her reader with well-crafted 'word sketches' that are impressionistic and expressionistic. Her poetry, the result of a dialectic between voices of her past, present, and future, reveals her role and relation to a tradition of Western poetics; her artistic invention of poetry as a visual impression combines graphic social criticism and visual creation, that which is both didactic and mimetic, into an exciting synthesis of a new aesthetic; her verse makes her reader a viewer of art (synesthetic imagery) as well." Erlene Stetson

"One can perceive between the two covers of this one crafted volume, in its full imaginative scope, the web of intricate and brilliant imagery her pen has spun forth in the journey of a sensitive, independent and compassionate spirit across these turbulent times in this uncertain place." Samuel A. Allen

== Bibliography ==
=== Poetry collections ===
- Impressions of African Art Forms, 1960
- To Flower, 1963
- Poem Counterpoem, with Dudley Randall, 1966
- Not Light, Nor Bright, Nor Feathery, 1968
- Iron Lace, 1968
- The Down of a Thistle: Selected Poems, Prose Poems, and Songs, 1976

=== Volumes edited ===
- Brass Horses, 1968
- Regroup, 1968

=== In anthologies (selected) ===
- Rosey E. Pool (ed.), Beyond the Blues: New Poems by American Negroes. Lympne, Kent, UK: Hand and Flower Press, 1962.
- Arna Bontemps (ed.), American Negro Poetry. Revised Edition. New York: Hill and Wang, 1974.
- King, Woodie, The Forerunners: Black Poets in America. Washington: Howard University Press, 1975.
- Erlene Stetson (ed.), Black Sister: Poetry by Black American Women, 1746–1980. Bloomington: Indiana University Press, 1981.

=== Recordings ===
- Writers of the Revolution, with Langston Hughes (Black Forum; alternately Poets of the Revolution, Motown Records)
