= Poet Laureate of Illinois =

The poet laureate of Illinois is the poet laureate for the U.S. state of Illinois. Initially, this was a life-time appointment made by the Governor of Illinois. In 2003, the honorary position was made into a four-year renewable award. Now, Illinois poets laureate are chosen by a committee of experts and officially appointed by the governor.

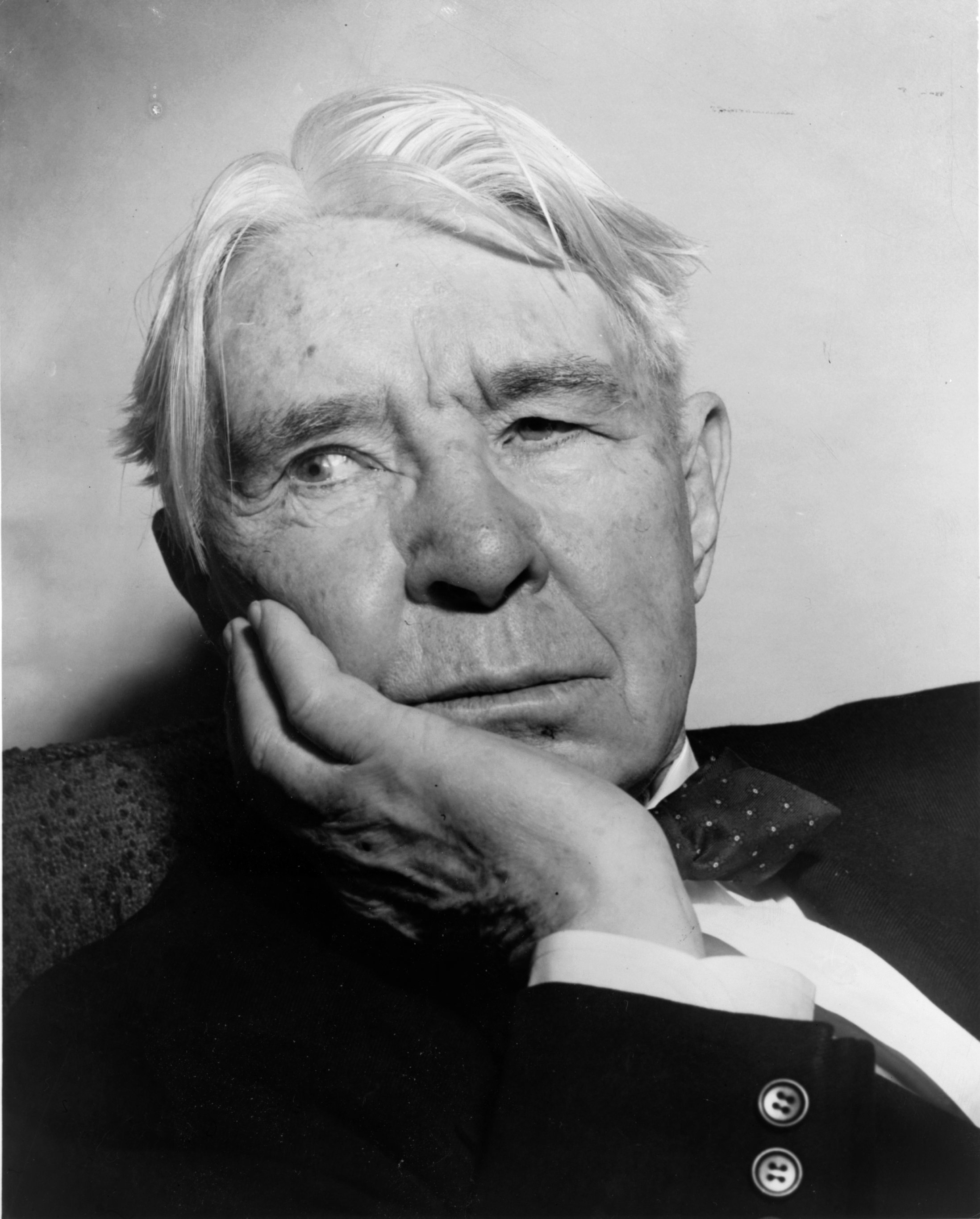
Carl Sandburg was the second poet laureate of Illinois

== List of poets laureate of Illinois ==
#	Poet laureate	Term	Appointed by	Notes
1	Howard Austin	1936–1962	Henry Horner	
2	Carl Sandburg	1962–1967	Otto Kerner Jr.	
3	Gwendolyn Brooks	1968–2000	Otto Kerner Jr.	
4	Kevin Stein	2003–2017	Rod Blagojevich	
-	John Prine	2020	J. B. Pritzker	Honorary title given posthumously.
5	Angela Jackson	2020–2025	J. B. Pritzker	
	Mark Turcotte	2025-Present	J. B. Pritzker	

== See also ==
- Poet laureate
- List of U.S. state poets laureate
- United States Poet Laureate
