= Third World Press =

Independent Black-owned publishing company

- Founded: 1967; 59 years ago
- Founder: Haki R. Madhubuti, Carolyn Rodgers, and Johari Amini
- Country of origin: United States
- Headquarters location: Chicago, Illinois
- Distribution: Ingram Publisher Services
- Publication types: Books
- Official website: thirdworldpressfoundation.org

Third World Press (TWP) is the largest independent Black-owned press in the United States, founded in 1967 by Haki R. Madhubuti (then known as Don L. Lee), with early support from Johari Amini and Carolyn Rodgers. Since the 1960s, the company has focused on publishing culturally progressive and political books of fiction and non-fiction, poetry, and cross-genre work.

== History ==
Madhubuti recalled a pivotal encounter that led him to publishing. In 1960, as a teenager traveling to sell magazine subscriptions door-to-door, he visited a home in Springfield, Illinois. The door was opened by "a very sophisticated African-American man" who invited him in, fed him, and offered him advice. "He said, 'Young man, the one thing no one can take away from you is an education,'" as Madhubuti recalled. The man encouraged him to enroll in college and gave him $20, about $160 today. Afterwards, Madhubuti said he returned to Chicago "determined to build something of his own".

In Chicago, he became active in the Black Arts Movement, within which Gwendolyn Brooks became a literary mentor and model. In December 1967, Madhubuti met with poet and activist Carolyn Rodgers and Johari Amini in the basement of his South Side apartment in Chicago to launch Third World Press (TWP) as an outlet for African-American literature. With $400 earned from poetry readings, a mimeograph machine, and Dudley Randall's home-based Broadside Press as a business model, Madhubuti began operation. By 2007, the company continued to thrive in a multimillion-dollar facility. It is the stated mission of TWP "to always honor Black writers and artists and to celebrate artists of all cultures".

In May 2011, Third World Press developed and launched TWPBooks.com, which replaced the former ThirdWorldPressInc.com. TWPBooks.com leverages the heritage and technological spirit for which Third World Press has come to be known. Under the direction of Madhudbuti, Third World Press has embraced social media and the prevalence of eBooks, while upgrading its internal technologies to better serve customers of Third World Press.

In 2015, Madhubuti converted Third World Press into the non-profit Third World Press Foundation. Explaining the change, he told Publishers Weekly that the company "needed a new, more realistic business model for our authors". In addition to its publishing operation, the foundation runs a pair of charter schools and one private school using a curriculum that incorporates African thought and culture that serves children from preschool through eighth grade.

== Notable works and authors ==
Third World Press has published works by Pulitzer Prize-winning author Gwendolyn Brooks, as well as by Sonia Sanchez, Sterling Plumpp and Pearl Cleage. The list of authors published by TWP also includes Amiri Baraka, Margaret Walker, Sam Greenlee, Naomi Long Madgett, Keorapetse Kgositsile, Mari Evans, Kalamu ya Salaam, Gloria Naylor, Gil Scott-Heron, Chancellor Williams, George E. Kent and many others.

In 2006, The Covenant with Black America, with an introduction by Tavis Smiley, reached No. 1 in the New York Times Best Seller list.

The poet Parneshia Jones, director of Northwestern University Press, began her publishing career as an intern at Third World Press.

== See also ==
- African-American book publishers in the United States, 1960–80
