= Naomi Long Madgett =

American poet and publisher (1923–2020)

- Born: Naomi Cornelia Long; July 5, 1923; Norfolk, Virginia, U.S.
- Died: November 4, 2020 (aged 97); West Bloomfield, Michigan, U.S.
- Education: Virginia State College
- Occupations: Poet; teacher; editor and publisher; founder of Lotus Press
- Writing career
- Pen name: Naomi L. Witherspoon
- Period: 1949–2020
- Notable awards: Poet Laureate of Detroit
- Website: naomilongmadgett.net

Naomi Long Madgett (July 5, 1923 – November 4, 2020) was an American poet and publisher. Originally a teacher, she later found fame with her award-winning poems and was also the founder and senior editor of Lotus Press, established in 1972, a publisher of poetry books by black poets. Known as "the godmother of African-American poetry", she was the Detroit poet laureate since 2001.

== Life and work ==
Madgett was born as Naomi Cornelia Long in Norfolk, Virginia, in July 1923. She was the only daughter and the youngest of the three children of Baptist minister Rev. Dr. Clarence Marcellus Long and Maude Selena Long (née Hilton). Naomi was 18 months old when the family moved to East Orange, New Jersey, where her father was pastor of Calvary Baptist Church. She began writing at an early age, having her first published poem published in the Orange Daily Courier when she was 13 years old. While living in New Jersey, she went to an integrated school, where she faced racism as an African American. She graduated from Ashland Grammar School and began attending East Orange High School, until in 1937 her family moved to St. Louis, where for the following four years her father served as pastor of Central Baptist Church. Madgett attended and graduated with honors from Sumner High School, where she was encouraged to write and she read widely, from Aesop's Fables and Robert T. Kerlin's anthology Negro Poets and Their Poems to Romantic and Victorian English poets such as John Keats, William Wordsworth, and Alfred Tennyson.

At the age of 17 she published her first small collection of poetry, Songs to a Phantom Nightingale (1941), a few days after graduating from high school.

She went on to Virginia State College (now Virginia State University), and graduated in 1945 with a bachelor of arts degree. She began studies at New York University in 1946, but that year moved to Detroit, Michigan, after marrying Julian Fields Witherspoon, whom she had first met at Sumner High School.

Madgett worked for a while as a staff writer at the Michigan Chronicle, where she published many poems under the name Naomi L. Witherspoon. She gave birth to a daughter, Jill Annette Witherspoon, in 1947, although the marriage was short-lived, ending in divorce in 1948.

In 1949 Madgett's poem "Refugee" appeared in The Poetry of the Negro, an anthology edited by Arna Bontemps with Langston Hughes, who was an early mentor of Madgett's, after at the age of 15 she had met him at a poetry reading of his in St Louis.

In 1955, she graduated from Wayne State University with a M.Ed. Her poem "Midway", from her 1956 collection One and the Many, attracted wide attention as it portrayed black people's struggles, and victories, in a time when racism was prevalent in the United States. Her work appeared in a variety of publications, including Freedomways, Phylon, The Blue River Poetry Magazine, Negro History Bulletin, Negro Digest, as well as in other anthologies such as Hughes's 1964 New Negro Poets: U.S.A.

Becoming a teacher, Madgett taught the first black literary course in the Detroit public school system for 12 years, most of them spent at Northwestern High School. Her third poetry collection, Star by Star, was published in 1965, also gaining acclaim. In 1968, she taught creative writing and black literature at Eastern Michigan University, where she was appointed associate professor of English. While at Eastern she earned her Ph.D. from The International Institute for Advanced Studies. Promoted to full professor, she retired in 1984 as Professor of English Emeritus at the age of 60. In 1972, after she had difficulty finding a publisher for her fourth book, she had published it herself from a company she set up, Lotus Press, realizing that there was a need for presses that promoted African-American writers. The imprint published Black writers such as Herbert Woodward Martin, Dolores Kendrick, James A. Emanuel, Gayl Jones, Haki Madhubuti, May Miller, Toi Derricotte, and Dudley Randall, and for many years was run by Madgett from her basement mostly single-handedly – though in the early years she invented an editorial assistant named Connie Withers "to give the imprint corporate heft." Madgett would continue to serve as publisher/editor of the company until 2015 when Lotus Press merged with Dudley Randall's Broadside Press to become Broadside Lotus Press.

Some of Madgett's poems, including "Midway", have been set to music as songs and publicly performed. As well as publishing collections of her own poetry, Madgett was editor of the anthology Adam of Ife: Black Women in Praise of Black Men (Lotus Press, 1992). She also wrote a textbook on creative writing

In 1993 the national Naomi Long Madgett Poetry Award was established, an annual award sponsored by Broadside Lotus Press to recognize and publish an outstanding manuscript by an African-American poet.

The many honors Madgett received included 1993's American Book Award and the George Kent Award in 1995. In 2001 she was appointed poet laureate of Detroit by Mayor Dennis Archer.

Her autobiography, Pilgrim Journey, was published in 2006, an in 2011 Madgett was the subject of a documentary film by David B. Schock called StarbyStar: Naomi Long Madgett, Poet & Publisher.

In 2012, Kresge Arts in Detroit presented her with the 2012 Kresge Eminent Artist Award, a $50,000 prize to recognize Madgett's "decades of commitment to originating, illuminating, and preserving poetry by African-Americans, and promoting the study and appreciation of African-American literature in schools and universities".

Madgett's last poetry collection, You Are My Joy and Pain: Love Poems, was published in fall 2020. She died on November 4, 2020, at her home in West Bloomfield, Michigan, aged 97.

== Awards ==
- Octavia and Other Poems (1988) was national co-winner of the College Language Association Creative Achievement Award.
- Long Poetry Foundation offered its first annual Naomi Long Madgett Poetry Award for excellence in a manuscript by an African-American poet.

== Selected bibliography ==
- Songs to a Phantom Nightingale, Fortuny's Publishers, 1941 (30 pages).
- One and the Many: Poems, Exposition Press, 1956 (including "Midway").
- Star by Star: Poems. Harlo Press. 1965.
- Pink Ladies in the Afternoon, Lotus Press, 1972 (reprinted 1990).
- Exits and Entrances. Lotus Press. 1978. ISBN 978-0-916418-13-7.
- Phantom Nightingale: Juvenilia: poems, 1934–1943. Lotus Press. 1981. ISBN 978-0-916418-30-4.
- Octavia and Other Poems. Third World Press. 1988. ISBN 978-0-88378-121-0.
- Remembrances of Spring: Collected Early Poems. Michigan State University Press. 1993. ISBN 978-0-87013-345-9.
- Connected Islands: New and Selected Poems. Lotus Press. 2004. ISBN 978-0-916418-94-6.
- Pilgrim Journey: Autobiography. Lotus Press. 2006. ISBN 978-0-916418-97-7.
- You Are My Joy and Pain: Love Poems, Wayne State University Press, 2020.

=== As editor ===
- Adam of Ife: Black Women in Praise of Black Men, Lotus Press, 1992.

=== Selected anthology contributions ===
- Arna Bontemps and Langston Hughes, eds (1949), "Refugee", The Poetry of the Negro: 1746–1949.
- Langston Hughes, New Negro Poets: U.S.A. (1964)
- Margaret Busby, ed. (1992). "New Day" and "Black Woman", Daughters of Africa: An International Anthology of Words and Writings by Women of African Descent, Jonathan Cape. ISBN 0-224-03592-4.
- Arnold Rampersad; Hilary Herbold, eds. (2006). "The Old Women". The Oxford Anthology of African-American Poetry. Oxford University Press. ISBN 978-0-19-512563-4.
- Melba Joyce Boyd; M. L. Liebler, eds. (2001). "City Nights; Grand Circus Park". Abandon Automobile: Detroit City Poetry 2001. Wayne State University Press. ISBN 978-0-8143-2810-1.
