= Sandra Jackson-Opoku =

American poet, novelist, and journalist (born 1953)

- Born: 1953 (age 72–73); Chicago, Illinois, United States
- Education: Columbia College Chicago; University of Massachusetts, Amherst
- Occupations: Poet, novelist and journalist
- Notable work: The River Where Blood is Born (1997)
- Awards: American Library Association Black Caucus Award

Sandra Jackson-Opoku (born 1953) is an American poet, novelist, screenwriter, and journalist, whose writing often focuses on culture and travel in the African diaspora. She has been the recipient of several awards, including from the National Endowment for the Arts, the Illinois Arts Council, and the American Antiquarian Society. Her novels include The River Where Blood is Born (1997), which won the American Library Association Black Caucus Award for Best Fiction, and Hot Johnny (and the Women Whom Loved Him), which was an Essence magazine bestseller in hardcover fiction. She has also taught literature and creative writing at educational institutions internationally, including at Columbia College Chicago, the University of Miami, Nova Southeastern University, the Writer's Studio at the University of Chicago, the North Country Institute for Writers of Color, the Hurston-Wright Writers Workshop, and Chicago State University.

== Biography ==
Born and brought up in Chicago, Illinois, she began to compose poetry as a young girl of 10 or 12, later contributing to the high school paper and participating in a writers group called OBAC (The Organization of Black American Culture) that was affiliated with the Black Arts Movement. She attended Columbia College Chicago, where she majored in Journalism before going on to study Communications and Afro-American Studies at the University of Massachusetts, Amherst, earning her BA in 1976, having studied under Chinua Achebe and Michael Thelwell, whom she cites as literary influences in addition to Toni Morrison and Gabriel García Márquez.

Her first novel, The River Where Blood Is Born, inspired by a trip to Africa in 1975, was published in 1997, winning the American Library Association Black Caucus Award for Best Fiction. The review in the Chicago Sun-Times said: "Besides its sheer literary beauty, Jackson-Opoku’s story-weaving will give readers a new spiritual dimension from which to consider the meaning of life." She is also the author of a 2001 novel, about which Publishers Weekly wrote: "Jackson-Opoku's ability to craft memorable characters with distinct temperaments and sensibilities marks her as a writer to be reckoned with." As a children's writer, she has received the Society of Children's Book Writers and Illustrators Colen Award in New Children's Writing and a Maeve Marie Fellowship for Children’s Writing at the Writers' Colony at Dairy Hollow.

To mark what would have been the 100th birthday of Gwendolyn Brooks (1917–2000), Jackson-Opoku co-edited, with Quraysh Ali Lansana, the anthology Revise the Psalm: Work Celebrating the Writing of Gwendolyn Brooks (2017). Featuring contributions from such writers as Angela Jackson, Sandra Cisneros, Rita Dove, and Diane Glancy, it was described in The Chicago Review of Books as "absolutely essential reading for anyone hoping to understand the impact Brooks made on the arts and activism, not just in Chicago but throughout the country." In a review for The New York Times, Claudia Rankine wrote that in Revise the Psalm "we get a keen sense of the poet and her fierce commitment to community engagement".

Jackson-Opoku's fiction, poetry, and nonfiction writings have been widely published in outlets including The Los Angeles Times, Ms. Magazine, The Literary Traveller, Transitions Abroad, Rolling Out, Soul of America, Islands Magazine, and elsewhere. She is also a contributor to the 2019 anthology New Daughters of Africa, edited by Margaret Busby.

She has taught Literature and Creative Writing at Chicago State University and at Columbia College, as well as at other educational institutions and at workshops around the world.

In July 2020, she was listed as one NewCity's "Lit 50", Chicago's annual Hall of Fame honouring the city's literary community.

== Selected bibliography ==
- The River Where Blood Is Born (novel), One World, 1997, ISBN 978-0-345-42476-1
- Hot Johnny (And the Women Who Loved Him) (novel), One World, 2001, ISBN 978-0-345-43508-8
- Sea Island Summer (for children), Hyperion, 2001, ISBN 978-0786804313

=== As co-editor ===
- With Quraysh Ali Lansana, Revise the Psalm: Work Celebrating the Writing of Gwendolyn Brooks, Curbside Splendor Publishing, 2017, ISBN 978-1940430867.
