= LCHC =

LCHC may refer to:

- Grand Theft Auto IV soundtrack#LCHC – Liberty City Hardcore
- Laboratory of Comparative Human Cognition (LCHC)
