= Etheridge Knight =

American poet (1931–1991)

- Born: April 19, 1931; Corinth, Mississippi, US
- Died: March 10, 1991 (aged 59); Indianapolis, Indiana, US
- Resting place: Crown Hill Cemetery and Aboretum, Section 62, Lot 173; 39.823083°N 86.1703255°W
- Education: Martin University (BA)
- Occupation: Poet
- Notable work: Poems from Prison

Etheridge Knight (April 19, 1931 – March 10, 1991) was an African-American poet. Considered one of the most important poets of the American literary tradition, he was a recipient of the National Endowment for the Arts grant, a Guggenheim Fellowship, and the American Book Award for Poetry. Born in Corinth, Mississippi, he was incarcerated in Indianapolis in 1960, where he discovered poetry. Knight first made his name in 1968 with his debut volume, Poems from Prison, which recalls in verse his eight-year-long sentence. Poems established Knight as one of the major poets of the Black Arts Movement, which flourished from the early 1960s through the mid-1970s.

In addition to his other accolades, Knight was nominated for the National Book Award and Pulitzer Prize for Poetry. In his 2012 book Understanding Etheridge Knight, Michael S. Collins calls Knight "a mighty American poet....He and Wallace Stevens stand as 'two poles of American poetry,' according to his better-known fellow writer Robert Bly. Or, rather, Knight was, as he often said, a poet of the belly: a poet of the earth and of the body, a poet of the feelings from which cries and blood oaths and arias come, while Stevens was a poet, arguably, of the ache left in the intellect after it tears itself from God. 'Ideas are not the source of poetry,' Knight told one interviewer. 'For me it's passion, heart and soul....'"

== Biography ==
Knight was born on April 19, 1931, as one of eight children to Belzora Cozart Knight and Etheridge "Bushie" Knight in rural Corinth, Mississippi, but moved with his family to Paducah, Kentucky, where his father, a failed farmer, worked as a laborer on the Kentucky Dam. During this time, Knight frequently ran away from home, and so, was sent back to Corinth during the summer to stay with an uncle. Although he was an extremely bright student, Knight decided to drop out of school at the age of 16. His first job was as a shoe shiner in a small Kentucky town, where he first became more attuned to nuances of language as he absorbed the world and activity around him. In addition to his work, Knight spent much of his time at juke joints, pool halls, and underground poker games, which furthered his interest in language. It was during this time that Knight became exposed to "toasts," narrative-style oral poetry which relates a story.

In 1947, Knight enlisted in the army and served as a medical technician in the Korean War until November 1950, during which time he sustained serious wounds as well as psychological trauma, which led him to begin using morphine. By the time he was discharged from the army and returned to Indianapolis, Indiana, where his family had moved, he had become addicted to opiates. Knight spent much of the next several years dealing drugs and stealing to support his drug addiction.

In 1960, after a few previous run-ins with the police, Knight and two of his associates were arrested for armed robbery. He was initially so furious about his sentence that he was later unable to recall much of what happened during the first few months of his sentence. However, after realizing that such anger was counterproductive, he turned his attention to reading as much as he could and dedicated himself to poetry.

During the following years, Knight became increasingly well known for his poetry writings. After working as a journalist for prison publications, he began submitting poetry to the Negro Digest in 1965. He also started establishing contacts with significant figures in the African-American literary community, including well-known poets such as Gwendolyn Brooks, Dudley Randall, Haki Madhubuti, and Sonia Sanchez, his eventual first wife, many of whom came to visit him in prison. The poems Knight had written during his time in prison were so effective that Dudley Randall, a poet and owner of Broadside Press, published Knight's first volume of verse, Poems from Prison, and hailed Knight as one of the major poets of the Black Arts Movement. The book's publication coincided with his release from prison.

Upon his release from prison in 1968, Knight married poet Sonia Sanchez. Over the next few years, he held the position of writer-in-residence at several universities, including two years, 1968 and 1969, spent at the University of Pittsburgh. While living in Pittsburgh with his wife and their family, Knight spent time as poetry editor for Motive magazine. Knight and Sanchez were divorced in 1970 due to his continuing drug addiction. He continued writing his third book, Belly Song and Other Poems, which was published in 1973. His third work incorporates new life experiences and attitudes about love and race, and Knight was praised for the work's sincerity. Belly Song was nominated for the National Book Award and the Pulitzer Prize. Knight's time in Pennsylvania was very important to his career: his work during this period won him both a National Endowment for the Arts grant in 1972 and a Guggenheim Fellowship in 1974.

Knight married Mary McAnally in 1972, and she adopted two children. They settled in Minneapolis, Minnesota, until they separated in 1977. He then resided in Memphis, Tennessee, where he received Methadone treatments. In 1986, the University of Pittsburgh Press published The Essential Etheridge Knight, a compilation of his work that won the American Book Award for Poetry.

In 1990, Knight earned a bachelor's degree in American poetry and criminal justice from Martin University in Indianapolis. He taught at the University of Pittsburgh, the University of Hartford, and Lincoln University, before he was forced to stop working due to illness. He also continued to be known as a charismatic poetry reader. Knight died in Indianapolis, Indiana, of lung cancer on March 10, 1991.

=== Style and themes ===
Knight's poetry uses Black vernacular and includes a number of haiku among its forms, including this poem titled "Vigo County": "Beyond the brown hill / Above the silent cedars, / Blackbirds flee the April rains." This message aligns with the Black Arts Movement in that the artists were no longer going to be imprisoned by silence; they would use their voices and art to escape.

Joyce Ann Joyce places Knight "in the context of an African philosophical/aesthetic tradition." His "tribute to the ancestors," she writes, "emerges as a ritualistic drama in which the values of the poet's ancestors are reborn, redefined, reaffirmed and reinterpreted, at once giving them added viability and sacralizing their new form." This ethnophilosophical perspective, she finds, "differs significantly from the Eurocentric concept of intertextuality that confines itself to reading texts only within the context of other texts.” Joyce calls him “a truly African oral performer", whose subjects "grew out of his and his people's lives" so that "viewed in the context of an African philosophical/aesthetic tradition, his poetry places him among those at the vanguard of any discussion of the history of African-American poetic letters." In his poem "Cell Song", Knight articulates his desire to create good from his time in prison. He speaks to himself:

Night Music Slanted
Light strike the cave of sleep. I alone
tread the red circle
and twist the space with speech

Come now, etheridge, don't
be a savior; take your words and scrape
the sky, shake rain

on the desert, sprinkle
salt on the tail
of a girl,

can there anything
good come out of
prison

Knight places the reader within the cell; he capitalizes the first three words to show emphasis – this is not actual music, but the quiet and intermittent noises expected to be heard at night in prison. In the dark and light of the "red circle," he paces and ruminates over the words and ideas in his head. He attempts to project to that life beyond the prison walls, to use his talents for good, to use his words to make an impact. The reader can imagine Knight walking in small circles within his cell, as the words of the poem wind tighter and tighter. He concludes rather than questions that "good" can "come out of prison".

His exploration of themes of freedom and imprisonment, including his tributes to Martin Luther King Jr. and Malcolm X, are noted in a biographical study by Cassie Premo, who writes that his life and work dwell on "the theme of prisons imposed from without (slavery, racism, poverty, incarceration) and prisons from within (addiction, repetition of painful patterns) [which] are countered with the theme of freedom. His poems of suffering and survival, trial and tribute, loss and love testify to the fact that we are never completely imprisoned. Knight's poetry expresses our freedom of consciousness and attests to our capacity for connection to others."

In his prison-era poem "The Warden Said to Me the Other Day", Knight "limns his feelings of emotional, imaginative, and perceptual confinement":

The warden said to me the other day
(innocently, I think), "Say, etheridge,
why come the black boys don't run off
like the white boys do?"
I lowered my jaw and scratched my head
And said (innocently, I think), "Well, suh,
I ain't for sure, but I reckon it's cause
We ain't got no wheres to run to."

Written in a vernacular style reminiscent of a tale by Uncle Remus, Knight expresses the doubtfulness of black autonomy and white motives, for "Knight[sees] American as a prison where, no matter how benevolent a warden wishes to be, his gestures remain part of what locks his charges in." Knight's true prison, then, is the ways in which the Law, controlled by white America, imprisons black bodies and black voices, regardless of their presumed physical freedom.

Knight's poem "A WASP Woman Visits a Black Junkie in Prison" shows how humans must only find a common interest to make a connection, in this case, both the black man and white woman have children. According to Premo, the "encounter leaves the man touched and softened by the woman, as are many of Knight's male speakers. In "Belly Song", the speaker "sings of love: all the emotion, pain, memory, and passion of living." In "The Stretching of the Belly", Knight contrasts the stretchmarks of his third wife, Charlene Blackburn with his own scars. His wife's representing "growth and life" while his are from "war, violence, and slavery".

== Works ==
- Poems from Prison. Detroit: Broadside Press, 1968.
- 2 Poems for Black Relocation Centers, 1968.
- The Idea of Ancestry, 1968.
- Black Voices from Prison (with others). New York: Pathfinder Press, 1970.
- A Poem for Brother Man, 1972.
- For Black Poets Who Think of Suicide, 1972.
- Belly Song and Other Poems. Detroit: Broadside Press, 1973.
- Born of a Woman: New and Selected Poems. Boston: Houghton Mifflin, 1980.
- The Essential Etheridge Knight. Pittsburgh: University of Pittsburgh Press, 1986.
- The Lost Etheridge. Athens: Kinchafoonee Creek Press, 2022.
