= Betty Shabazz International Charter School =

Location
- 7823 S Ellis Avenue; Chicago, Illinois 60619-3213; United States; 41°45′09″N 87°36′00″W

Information
- School type: Charter school
- Established: 1998
- School district: Chicago Public Schools
- Chairperson: Dr. Carol Lee
- Chief Education Officer: Dr. Elaine Mosely
- Grades: K-12
- Enrollment: 654 (in 2006-07)
- Website: http://www.bsics.org/

The Betty Shabazz International Charter School is a charter school in Chicago, Illinois serving students in pre-school through 8th grade.

== History ==
In early 1997 when charter schools were being introduced into the Chicago Public Schools, the founders began their work to establish a free Afrocentric school. Betty Shabazz International Charter School was founded in 1998 by Robert J. Dale, Anthony Daniels-Halisi, Carol D. Lee, Haki R. Madhubuti, and Soyini Walton.

The school began as an elementary school, but began serving high school students in 2005 after Chicago Public Schools approved the school's request to open DuSable Leadership Academy campus inside of DuSable High School. The same year, the school accepted a request from the school district to open the Barbara A. Sizemore Academy campus in the Auburn Gresham community three weeks prior to the start of the academic year.

== Campus ==
The school has three campuses on Chicago's South Side:

- Betty Shabazz International Charter School, located at 7823 S. Ellis Ave., serves students in kindergarten through 8th grade;
- DuSable Leadership Academy of Betty Shabazz International Charter School, located at 4934 S. Wabash Ave., serves students in 9-12th grades; and
- Barbara A. Sizemore Academy of Betty Shabazz International Charter School, located at 6547 S. Stewart Ave., serves students in kindergarten through 8th grades and is named for Barbara Sizemore. This school was formerly the Chicago Public Schools Hermann Raster Elementary School, established in 1910 and named after the famed Chicago editor Hermann Raster.

== Curriculum ==
Betty Shabazz International Charter School teaches a traditional core curriculum as well as a full arts and humanities program. Music, dance and visual arts form the center of the school's interdisciplinary approach to instruction. Through educational programs such as writing, oral tradition, history, art, music, dance, drumming and literature, students can discover and develop their creative gifts or talents.

All the schools have to follow the guidelines of the Illinois State Board of Education and the Chicago Public Schools. Benchmark assessments are conducted regularly to make sure that the teachers are following the necessary guideline for adequate teaching of lesson plans and covering the necessary school subjects. 11% of the school's students test as proficient in reading english.
