= Useni Eugene Perkins =

American dramatist (1932–2023)

Useni Eugene Perkins (September 13, 1932 – May 7, 2023) was an American poet, playwright, activist and youth worker. He is known for his poem "Hey Black Child".

== Biography ==
Useni Eugene Perkins was born on September 13, 1932, in Chicago, Illinois, to Marion Perkins, a sculptor, and Eva Perkins. When Perkins was 11 years old, his father took him to see Shakespeare's Othello performed by Paul Robeson. Perkins credits his father's efforts to expose his young son to the arts as an early major influence on Perkins' writing career.

In 1950 Perkins graduated from Chicago's Wendell Philips High School before going on to earn his B.S. in group social work (1961) and an M.S. in administration (1964) from George Williams College. Shortly thereafter, Perkins began working at the Henry Horner Chicago Boys Club, which launched his lifelong career of social and educational work with youth from low-income urban areas. In 1966, Perkins became the Director and then later the executive director of the Better Boys Foundation Family Center in Chicago, a position he held for nearly 20 years (1966–1982). During this time he authored many creative and academic written works detailing experiences from his childhood and his observations as a social worker.

The Chicago Public Library, which houses an extensive archive of Perkins' written works and biographical material, mentions, "In viewing this collection as a whole it is clear that Perkins worked wonders to fuse his professional career as a social worker with his creative expression as a writer. His plays were primarily focused on presenting positive role models and lessons geared toward urban youth." Throughout his career, Perkins was recognized as a social worker, an artist, and a community leader. He was invited to the Chicago Department of Cultural Affairs Advisory Board (1984), the Chicago Board of Education Task Force on Gangs (1981), and Illinois Governor James R. Thompson's Special Task Force on Troubled Youth (1980).

Perkins was highly influenced by the Black Arts Movement, which at its peak during the 1960s and 1970s was a cultural program that grew out of the Civil Rights and Black Power movements. Perkins was an early and influential activist in the Organization of Black American Culture (OBAC), the Chicago-based expression of the Black Arts Movement. Perkins died on May 7, 2023, at the age of 90.

== "Hey Black Child" ==
Useni Eugene Perkins is the author of "Hey Black Child", a poem that has been well known in Black American households since the mid-1970s. The poem was originally a song that was performed during The Black Fairy, a play written by Perkins in 1974. Following the play's success, Perkins' brother Toussaint Perkins published a poster with the lyrics to "Hey Black Child", but only cited Perkins' first name "Useni" on the poster. This may have led to some confusion as the poem has been incorrectly attributed to Maya Angelou and Countee Cullen. In 2017, Perkins published a children's book with an illustrated version of the poem.

== Bibliography ==
- An Apology to My African Brother (1965)
- Black is Beautiful (1968)
- Cry of the Black Ghetto (1970)
- Silhouette (1970)
- Home Is a Dirty Street: The Social Oppression of Black Children (1975)
- Pride of Race (1984)
- Midnight Blues in the Afternoon and Other Poems (1984)
- Harvesting New Generations: The Positive Development of Black Youth (1986)
- Explosion of Chicago's Street Gangs, 1900 to the Present (1987)
- Afrocentric Self Inventory and Discovery Workbook for African American Youth (1989)
- When You Grown Up: Poems for Children (1989)
- The Black Fairy and Other Plays (1993)
- Hey Black Child (2017)
