= Broadside Lotus Press =

Independent Black-owned small press

- Founded: Dudley Randall – Broadside Press 1965; 61 years ago
- Founder: Naomi Long Madgett – Lotus Press 1972; 54 years ago
- Country of origin: United States
- Headquarters location: Detroit
- Publication types: Books
- Official website: broadsidelotuspress.org

Broadside Lotus Press is an independent press created from the merger of two Detroit-based publishers – Broadside Press, founded by Dudley Randall in 1965; and Naomi Long Madgett's Lotus Press, founded in 1972. At the time of the merger they were among the oldest black-owned presses in the United States. On March 31, 2015, it was announced that Lotus Press would be merging with Broadside Press, forming the new Broadside Lotus Press.

== Broadside Press ==
Broadside Press was founded in 1965 by the poet librarian Dudley Randall as a showcase for African American authors. Early in the Press' history, Randall began by publishing 8.5x11 broadsides of single poems. Broadside Press was launched with publication of his poem "The Ballad of Birmingham." The Press changed ownership several times, in 1977 ownership of the Broadside Press was transferred to the Alexander Crummell Center for Worship and Learning, and back to Randall in 1981. In 1985, Hilda and Don Vest purchased the Press from Randall. Through its history, Broadside Press published the works of Gwendolyn Brooks, Margaret Walker, Margaret Danner, Robert Hayden, Sterling Brown, Sonia Sanchez, Willie Kgositsile, Nikki Giovanni, Haki Madhubuti, Mae Jackson, Etheridge Knight, and Audre Lorde. A bio-bibliography of Broadside Press authors by Leaonead Pack Bailey was published in 1974.

== Lotus Press ==
Naomi Long Madgett established Lotus Press in 1972. In 1980 Lotus Press, Inc. was recognized as a 501(C)(3) organization specializing in the publication of books of poetry. Madgett continued to serve as publisher/editor until 2015 when Lotus Press merged with Broadside Press, becoming what is now Broadside Lotus Press. The imprint published Black writers such as Herbert Woodward Martin, Dolores Kendrick, James A. Emanuel, Gayl Jones, Haki Madhubuti, May Miller, Toi Derricotte, and Dudley Randall. In 1993 the national Naomi Long Madgett Poetry Award was established to recognize and publish an outstanding manuscript by an African American poet. This annual award continues under the sponsorship of Broadside Lotus Press.

== See also ==
- African-American book publishers in the United States, 1960–80
