= George E. Kent =

African-American professor of literature

- Born: 1920; Columbus, Georgia
- Died: 1982 (aged 61–62)
- Education: Savannah State College; Boston University
- Occupation: educator
- Spouse: Desiré Ash

George E. Kent (1920–1982) was an African-American professor of literature, with a specialization in Afro-American literature.

== Early life and education ==
Born in Columbus, Georgia, George Kent was the youngest of four children born to Irby D. Kent, a blacksmith and Louise Austin Kent, a school teacher. Even as a child he would teach alongside his mother. He met his wife, Desiré Ash, whilst studying for his BA at Savannah State College. After serving in the 25th Infantry (1942–5), he resumed his university studies. Kent and his wife, Desire, had two children.

With a strong love of literature, and a dream of becoming a teacher in his own future, he began teaching at the age of 16 in one of the schools his mother had established. His formal higher education began with a B.S in English from Savannah State College. He later obtained a master's degree and Ph.D. from Boston University, in English Language and Literature, respectively. During these formative years, he also served in the military.

== Career ==
Over a long teaching career, he held numerous positions including visiting professorships with colleges and universities such as Wesleyan University, University of Connecticut, Florida A & M University, Grambling State University, and the University of Chicago. From the 1940s through the 1960s he held positions from Professor of English to Professor and Chairman of Languages and Literature, as well as Dean of Delaware State College. He was also Professor and Chairman of English in the Division of Liberal Arts at Quinnipiac College.

He finished his career in education as a professor of English, with a specialty in African-American literature and poetry at the University of Chicago from 1970 until his death in 1982. Kent was the first tenured African-American professors of English at that institution.

The University of Chicago Organization of Black students honors Kent annually at the OBS George E. Kent Lecture.

His specialism was Afro-American literature. He completed the first full biography of the poet Gwendolyn Brooks just before his death from cancer in 1982.

== Key publications ==
- Blackness and the Adventure of Western Culture, Third World Press, 1972 (ISBN 0-88378-026-7
- A Life of Gwendolyn Brooks, University Press of Kentucky, 1990 (ISBN 0-8131-0827-6)
