= Laboratory of Comparative Human Cognition =

Social science laboratory in the United States

Laboratory of Comparative Human Cognition (LCHC) is a social science laboratory located at the University of California, San Diego (UCSD) since 1978. Scholars at LCHC pursue research focused on understanding the complex relationship between cognition and culture in individual and social development. Such research requires collaboration among scholars from a variety of research disciplines, including cognitive science, education, linguistics, psychology, anthropology, and sociology. LCHC also functions as a research and training institution, arranging for pre-doctoral, doctoral, and post-doctoral training, as well as research exchanges with scholars throughout the world. In addition, LCHC sponsors a journal, Mind, Culture and Activity: An International Journal (MCA), and an open internet discussion group, XMCA.

== Formative influences ==
The LCHC is rooted in several research traditions and interests, beginning with cross-cultural research in Africa and Mexico on the developmental impact of indigenous practices, literacy, and schooling. The methodological approach of this research was a blend of experimental psychology and cognitive ethnography that highlighted the roles of cultural contexts and the need to carefully study local practices and local people's interpretations of those practices. As this research developed, it drew inspiration from Soviet psychology, cultural psychology, Black psychology, cultural anthropology, distributed cognition, actor-network theory, and American pragmatism. LCHC has also been strongly influenced by ideas from developmental psychology and takes a strong multidisciplinary, “theory and practice” approach to the social sciences and humanities.

Of the influences mentioned above, Soviet psychology, cultural anthropology, and American pragmatism have been particularly important to the intellectual formation of members of the LCHC. From Soviet psychology—specifically the work of cultural-historical psychologist Lev Vygotsky (1896–1934) and Vygotsky-inspired cultural-historical activity theory (CHAT), LCHC researchers inherited an interest in cultural mediation—the idea that humans use cultural artifacts to control both their environments and their own actions. This interest in mediation was coupled with a concern for the activities that cultural artifacts mediate. From this combined approach, LCHC researchers seek to make visible for analysis those processes "that realize a person’s actual life in the objective world by which he is surrounded, his social being in all the richness and variety of its forms" (A.N. Leont’ev, 1977). From cultural anthropology (e.g., Gregory Bateson, Roy D'Andrade, Clifford Geertz) and American pragmatism (e.g., John Dewey, George Mead, Charles Peirce) LCHC adopted both methods for the analysis of behavior in situ (ethnography, the comparative method, modes of discourse analysis) and theoretical guidance for thinking about the co-constitution of persons and their environments, and the histories of the cultural practices through which they lead their lives.

Taken together, these domains of social science theory and methodology have informed the diverse research projects of the members of the LCHC. By integrating these approaches, LCHC researchers combine cultural-historical psychologists’ insistence on historical/developmental analysis (influenced by Marxism) with anthropologist's/pragmatist's emphasis on the analysis of concrete activity systems and the diversity of such systems within and between societies.

== Origins and history ==
The LCHC emerged during the Civil Rights Movement, a time when issues regarding education and employment for minorities were being sharply debated. On a world scale, groups such as UNESCO were concerned with how to improve education throughout the developing world. This historical context motivated foundations to give grants to LCHC to conduct research on apparent cultural variations in cognitive development and their significance for maximizing success in schooling.

LCHC was originally based at Rockefeller University in New York City from 1971 to 1978 and has been based at the UC San Diego (UCSD) from 1978 to the present. When the LCHC relocated from New York to California, it changed both its university and departmental setting, with its new base of operations now in the Department of Communication. This institutional relocation permitted the LCHC to: 1) expand its research concerns to include the use of new communication technologies in various settings; 2) forge community partnerships in the racially, economically, and politically diverse border-city of San Diego; and 3) situate LCHC research within the discipline of communication studies, for which mediation is a central, constitutive, concept.

== Cross-cultural studies ==
The LCHC has participated in key cross-cultural studies, such as research projects with the Kpelle people and the Vai people (both of Liberia), and rural residents in Yucatan, Mexico. These studies were instrumental in formulating a critique of contemporaneous methods of cross-cultural and developmental psychology. LCHC researchers argued that studies of human cognitive activity must be grounded in the actual materials and processes of people's daily lives (ecological validity). Using this approach, they demonstrated that years of schooling strongly influence performance on many common cognitive tasks, but that such influences do not support the conclusion of a general cognitive impact of schooling on cognitive development. This work called into question the use of cognitive tasks to measure school achievement by showing that schooled children scored better on psychological tests while performing far below expectations on their schoolwork. This finding refocused research attention to the link between activities that children engaged in outside of formal schooling and their performance in the classroom. The interplay between informal and formal educational activities continues to concern LCHC researchers today.

== Research activities in the United States ==
LCHC has been noted for conducting comparative developmental studies in a number of domains of social practice in the United States, including: comparative studies of language and cognitive development among children of different ethnicities and social classes or with differing forms of apparent learning disability; building model activity systems to promote learning and development, such as Playworlds and the Fifth Dimension; and studies of development in work settings.

Current active topics of research at LCHC include: adult-child fantasy play worlds as media for inter-generational development; intervention research using methods of design research, formative experiments, and studies of the micro-genesis of developmental change mediated by new technologies.

== Research philosophy ==
The LCHC's physical location on the UCSD campus is rarely the site of data collection because of LCHC's methodological imperative: to observe cognition and other psychological phenomena in everyday activities, then to use the structure of that activity as a template for creating experiments, conceived of as model activity systems.

LCHC research programs strive to meet the practical need for developing democratic collaborations. On the one hand, this need requires local community members to participate in the activities of the laboratory, creating partnerships between academics and non-academics referred to as UCLinks. On the other hand, within the academic community, democratic collaboration requires faculty, graduate, and undergraduate students share responsibility for the implementation of research, creating a multi-generational system of joint activities.

Internationalism in research efforts has been a hallmark of the LCHC since its inception. Of special note in this regard is the VelHam Project, which was an ambitious attempt to link Soviet and U.S. educationalists and children engaged in common after-school activities through satellite feeds during the 1980s, and XMCA, a network of scholars seeking to develop the general set of ideas which underpin LCHC's reason for being.

== Technologies of research ==
The LCHC has a tradition of using modern communication and computer technologies in its research work. This tradition stemmed from a focus on the cultural tools (mediational means) that are central to all culturally organized human activity, and from efforts to extend the scholarly community that pursued issues of mutual concern to members of the LCHC. The role of digital technologies in settings for education, work, and play has and continues to influence the LCHC's research and intervention agenda, as evidenced by the Fifth Dimension and UCLinks projects. LCHC researchers also use digital audio- and video-recording technology for data collection, recording real-time interaction that can be analyzed later at multiple levels.

== Scientific communication activities ==
The LCHC has been directly and indirectly involved with many kinds of publication projects. It created LCHC Newsletter (1976 to 1993) to initiate an international discussion about culture in development, followed by the refereed academic journal MCA (1994 to present). It began sponsoring a listserv in the early 1980s (formerly XLCHC, now called XMCA) where scholars from all over the world discuss the issue of culture and development in a broad, interdisciplinary manner, communicating about topics such as cultural psychology, Vygotsky, cultural-historical activity theory, and more.

== Collaboration ==
Owing to its basic philosophy of research, the LCHC is notable for collaboration with a wide range of researchers in different disciplines and parts of the world. Of special note is the close collaboration between the LCHC and the Center for Research on Activity, Development and Learning (CRADLE) (was Center for Activity Theory and Developmental Work Research), and its long-term support of ISCAR (International Society for Cultural and Activity Research).

Hundreds of researchers have been associated with LCHC over the years and remain associated through its networking system.

== See also ==
- Cultural-Historical Activity Theory (CHAT)
- Cultural-historical psychology
- Activity theory
- Aleksei N. Leontiev
- Lev Vygotsky
- Zone of Proximal Development
