= James Emanuel =

American poet (1921–2013)

- Born: June 15, 1921; Alliance, Nebraska, US
- Died: September 28, 2013 (aged 92); Paris, France
- Education: Howard University; Northwestern University
- Occupations: Poet and scholar

James Emanuel (born June 15, 1921 – September 28, 2013) was a poet and scholar from Alliance, Nebraska. Emanuel, who is ranked by some critics as one of the best and most neglected poets of the 20th century, published more than 300 poems, 13 individual books, an influential anthology of African-American literature, an autobiography, and more. He is also credited with creating a new literary genre, jazz-and-blues haiku, often read with musical accompaniment.

== Early life ==
Born in Nebraska in 1921, Emanuel was raised in the state. He came from a family with seven children where he was the fifth. Literature had been part of his life since a really young age. He was induced into stories, poetic rhythms and prose by various authors. Due to this and all the readings he did reinforced and induced Emanuels ambition to become a writer. His childhood and adolescence were marked by racism which Emanuel says he owes less to the town's egalitarianism than to the more ideological drift of his family conversations and to his general popularity and success in school. He was a straight A student which gave him confidence to obtain a good work and successful life.

Emanuel, after graduating from high school worked on farms and ranches and this work experience served as an inspiration to write poems such as "Three Chores: One Country Day". He spent his early years in the western United States where he worked at a variety of jobs. At age twenty he joined the United States Army and served as confidential secretary to the Assistant Inspector General of the U.S. Army Benjamin O. Davis Sr. He did this in order to make enough money to pay for college. He did wartime duty as a staff sergeant with the 93rd Infantry Division in the Pacific.

== Academic and professional life ==
After his discharge, he did his undergraduate work at Howard University. In 1950, he was awarded his bachelor's degree, summa cum laude. During his time at Howard, he found motivation to write. He published several poems in college anthologies and campus newspapers. In that same year, he moved to Chicago and married Mattie Etha Johnson. He started working on his master's degree and obtained it from Northwestern University (M.A.) while working as civilian chief in the pre-induction section of the Army and Air Force Induction Station. After a long time in this position, he resigned because he thought that he had been passed over because of his race. Through his time at Northwestern he became more convinced that he wanted to write. His professors praised him for his work and called him a real poet. After hard work and rejections, Emanuel was awarded a John Hay Whitney Fellowship which supported his work at Northwestern and received the M.A. degree in 1953, and his first year of work toward the Ph.D. degree at Columbia University (Ph.D.). During time at Columbia he worked as a teacher at the Harlem YWCA Business School. In 1957, He moved to New York City, where he taught at the City College of New York (CUNY), where in the 1960s he taught the college's first class on African-American poetry and mentored future scholars such as Addison Gayle Jr. He worked on his poetry regularly, which was encouraged by various well known publication sources such as the New York Times.

Emanuel also worked as an editor, with his first editorial project being the publication of a collection of poetry by Langston Hughes, whom Emanuel considered his mentor. Finally in 1962 he received his degree with the support of his wife and seven-year-old son. He was able to overcome the obstacles of his personal and professional life. As the years passed Emanuel became frustrated with the state of racism in America. He was used to black writing from his own childhood but recent works were related to English masters such as Shakespeare. As he studied Hughes he realized the lack of attention that black writers received and decided to take matters into his own hands. He started to read work of black authors and intended to uncover the importance of black writers. And this is how he initiated the movement. In 1966, the first course in black poetry to be taught at CCNY. His desire was to focus on racial identity, race consciousness, and awareness of an attention to his literary forebears and contemporaries. On being offered teaching positions at universities in Europe in the late 1960s, he moved overseas. When his only child, James A. Emanuel Jr., committed suicide in Los Angeles two decades later, after being beaten by, in Emanuel's words "three cowardly cops", he vowed never to return to the United States. Emanuel eventually taught at the University of Toulouse (as a Fulbright scholar in 1968–1969), at the University of Grenoble, and at the University of Warsaw. He was living in Paris, France, at the time of his death.

== Writings ==
=== Poetry ===
Emanuel was a poet, scholar, and critic. As a poet, he published more than 300 poems and 13 individual books. Emanuel has been called one of the best, and most overlooked, poets of his time. Critics have put forward several reasons for Emanuel's poetry being neglected by the larger literary world, including the fact that he wrote more traditional poetic forms, that he left the United States, and the fact that he refused to take part in the politically correct world of Black academia. On 1968 Emanuel's first poetry named "The Treehouse and Other Poems" was published. This volume contains themes such as innocence, pain of youth and events of racism from his experience. This poems sometimes serious, sometimes ironic, sometimes lyrical, but never light. Almost uniformly they employ traditional patterns of rhythm and rhyme, but occasionally reflect blues and jazz forms learned first, perhaps, from the poetry of Langston Hughes. His poems reflect a racial concern and as his friend Marvin Holdt said that it also expresses the aspects of the black American experience in America, treated with bitterness and revolt.

His poems appear in 11 books of his own and in over 120 other volumes. His poems include "Christ, One Morning", "Snowman", "Bojangles and Jo", and many others Emanuel is also credited with creating a new literary genre, jazz-and-blues haiku, which he read to musical accompaniment throughout Europe and Africa. For this creation he was awarded the Sidney Bechet Creative Award in 1996. Emanuel was also awarded the Dean's Award for Distinguished Achievement in 2007 from Columbia University's Graduate School of Arts and Sciences and was also honored with a John Hay Whitney Award, a Saxton Memorial Fellowship, and a Special Distinction Award from the Black American Literature Forum.

=== Criticism and letters ===
In addition to his poetry, Emanuel also edited (with Theodore Gross) the influential anthology of African-American literature Dark Symphony: Negro Literature in America. Published in 1968 by Free Press, the anthology was one of the first major collections of African-American writings. This anthology, and Emanuel's work as an educator, heavily influenced the birth of the African-American literature genre.

In 2000, a collection of Emanuel's letters and writings were placed in the United States Library of Congress. Included among the papers was correspondence with Gwendolyn Brooks, Ralph Ellison, Benjamin O. Davis, Ossie Davis, W. E. B. Du Bois, and many others.

Emanuel also edited five Broadside Critics books (1971–1975) and wrote a number of critical essays. His other published works include a memoir, The Force and the Reckoning, published in 2001.

== Bibliography ==
- Langston Hughes (New York: Twayne. 192 pp.)
- Dark Symphony: Negro Literature in America with Theodore L. Gross (New York: Free Press. 604 pp.)
- The Treehouse and Other Poems (Detroit: Broadside Press. 24 pp.)
- Panther Man (Detroit: Broadside Press. 32 pp.)
- How I Write/2 with MacKinlay Kantor and Lawrence Osgood (New York: Harcourt Brace Jovanovich. 256 pp.)
- Black Man Abroad: The Toulouse Poems(Detroit: Lotus Press. 76 pp.)
- A Chisel in the Dark (Poems Selected and New) (Detroit: Lotus Press. 73 pp.)
- A Poet's Mind (New York: Regents. 85pp.)
- The Broken Bowl (New and Collected Poems) (Detroit: Lotus Press. 85 pp.)
- Deadly James and Other Poems (Detroit: Lotus Press. 82 pp.)
- The Quagmire Effect
- Whole Grain: Collected Poems, 1958–1989 (Detroit: Lotus Press. 396 pp.)
- De la rage au cœur, with Jean Migrenne and Michel Fabre (Thaon, France: Amiot/Lenganey. 173 pp.)
- Blues in Black and White
- Reaching for Mumia: 16 Haiku
- Jazz from the Haiku King
- The Force and the Reckoning
