= Johari Amini =

American poet (1935–2023)

- Born: Jewel C. Latimore; January 13, 1935; Philadelphia, Pennsylvania, U.S.
- Died: December 12, 2023 (aged 88)
- Resting place: Oak Woods Cemetery
- Known for: Writing, activism

Johari Amini (January 13, 1935 – December 12, 2023) was an American author, poet and chiropractor.

== Life and career ==
Amini was born Jewel Latimore in Philadelphia on January 13, 1935. She cofounded the Third World Press in 1967 and was a staff member of the Institute of Positive Education. Amini also contributed to other Black Arts Movement institutions such as the Writers Workshop of the Organization of Black American Culture (OBAC), its publication NOMMO, the Kuumba Theater, and the Gwendolyn Brooks Writers' Workshop. She co-founded and edited Black Books Bulletin. Amini wrote many poems and short stories published in journals such as Black World. She was also a practicing chiropractor. She wrote a book titled A Commonsense Approach to Eating (1975) that merged her two career paths. Amini died on December 12, 2023, at the age of 88.

== Selected works ==
- Images in Black (1967)
- Black Essence (1968)
- Fable for My People (1971)
- Let's Go Somewhere (1970)
- A Hip Tale in Death Style (1970)
- A Commonsense Approach to Eating (1975).
