= Cecil Brown (writer) =

African-American writer and educator

- Born: July 3, 1943 (age 83); Bolton, North Carolina, U.S.
- Education: North Carolina Agricultural and Technical State University; Columbia University; University of Chicago
- Occupations: Writer and educator
- Writing career
- Period: 1969–present

Cecil Brown (born July 3, 1943) is an African-American writer and educator. He is a published novelist, short story writer, script writer, and college educator. His noted works include The Life and Loves of Mr. Jiveass Nigger (1969) and work on the 1977 Richard Pryor film Which Way Is Up? as a screenwriter.

== Biography ==
Born in rural Bolton, North Carolina, United States, Brown attended North Carolina Agricultural and Technical State University of Greenboro, where he earned his B.A. degree in English in 1966. He later attended Columbia University, and earned his M.A. degree from the University of Chicago in 1967. Brown while residing in Berkeley, California (to which he returned in the late 1980s and still lives and works), earned his Ph.D. in African American Studies, Folklore and Narrative in 1993. He is a professor at UC Berkeley.

== Works ==
- The Life and Loves of Mr. Jiveass Nigger (1969), ISBN 978-1-583-94210-9
- Pryor Lives (1969)
- Days without Weather (1983)
- Coming Up Down Home (1993)
- I, Stagolee (1993)
- Stagolee Shot Billy (2003), ISBN 978-0-674-01626-2
- Dude, Where's My Black Studies Department? (2007), ISBN 978-1-556-43573-7
- Journey's End (2007), ISBN 978-1-417-99328-4

== Awards ==
- Columbia University English Dept., Professor John Angus Burrell Memorial Prize, 1966
- Before Columbus Foundation American Book Award for Days Without Weather, 1984
- Berlin Literary Fellowship, 1985; Besonders Wertvoll Film Preises, 1986
- UC Berkeley, Mentor Fellowship, 1992
