= International Society for Cultural and Activity Research =

International psychological society

The International Society for Cultural and Activity Research (ISCAR) was founded in 2002 by the merging of the International Society for Cultural Research and Activity Theory and the Conference for Sociocultural Research. It is focused on sociocultural theory, and its application to practice.
