= Howard Austin =

First poet laureate of Illinois

- Born: July 27, 1886; Blue Mound, Illinois
- Died: April 1, 1962 (aged 75); Springfield, Illinois
- Occupation: accountant
- Language: English
- Genre: extemporaneous poetry
- Years active: 1920s–1962
- Notable awards: First poet laureate of Illinois
- Spouse: Violet May Arthur
- Children: Betty Ruth, Howard Robert, William Roger, Arthur Dean

Website
- www.howard-austin.org

Howard Austin (July 27, 1886 – April 1, 1962) was an American poet, accountant, and improvisational performer. He was named the first poet laureate of Illinois in 1936.

== Early life and career ==
Austin was born on his family's farm near Blue Mound, Macon County, Illinois in 1886. He was working in a bank in Taylorville when he was drafted into the 307th Field Artillery Regiment to fight in World War I. His wartime experience later provided material for some of his poems. After returning home, Austin found work in another bank in Pawnee, Illinois. He married a coworker, Violet May Arthur, in 1921. The couple were to have three sons and a daughter.

Austin spent most of his career working as an accountant. He worked in the Sangamon County clerk's office for a time; after losing an election for Circuit Clerk in 1940 he returned to the private sector. He worked for the Sangamon County Farm Bureau and later founded his own firm.

== Poetry ==
While living in Pawnee, Austin and three other men formed the Pawnee Four, an improvisational musical quartet. The group performed at banquets, political events, and other events featuring speakers. Austin would quickly write poems using material from the speeches, most often lampooning them. The quartet would then sing and harmonize using Austin's lyrics.

In the 1930s, the Pawnee Four performed at numerous events alongside Governor Henry Horner. At a Jackson Day event in Springfield in 1936, the quartet performed a song called "Be It Resolved" that largely praised the governor but also poked fun at his unmarried status, urging him to "pick out a handsome old maid and get himself a wife." The performance made such an impression on Horner that he declared his intention to make Austin Illinois's first poet laureate. He carried out this promise soon after, presenting Austin with the declaration on January 14, 1936.

Austin continued to write poems for performance, and as he grew older, increasingly, for private purposes or circulation within his family. Many of these private poems dealt with patriotic themes and drew on his wartime experience. Other themes included his family, current events, and religious reflection. According to his family, he typically wrote these poems in the same way that he wrote his verse for performance: impromptu and rarely edited.

Howard Austin never affiliated himself with literary circles and never published any of his writing. His work was "poetry of the moment" quite different from the more polished verse characteristic of his successors as Poet Laureate.

== Later life and legacy ==
In 1962, Governor Otto Kerner named Carl Sandberg to be Illinois's new poet laureate. One month later, Austin, a lifelong cigar smoker, died of lung cancer in his home in Springfield.

Governor Kerner was evidently unaware that Austin had been granted the honor years before; he believed that Sandberg was the state's first poet laureate. The Illinois State Journal published an article the next day to correct the governor and highlight Austin and his poetry. In 2000, following the death of Sandberg's successor as laureate Gwendolyn Brooks, Austin was still forgotten in press reports and the state government website, prompting another feature in the same newspaper. By 2003, when a Governor's Illinois Poet Laureate Review Committee was established to regularize the position, Austin's name was restored in official reports as the first in the state.
