= The Ballad of Birmingham =

1965 poem by Dudley Randall

"Ballad of Birmingham" is a poem by Dudley Randall, that he published as a broadside in 1965. It was written in response to the 1963 bombing at the 16th Street Baptist Church in Birmingham, Alabama. The poem was set to music by folk singer Jerry Moore in 1967 after he read it in a newspaper, and features on his album Life is a Constant Journey Home.

== Description ==
"Ballad of Birmingham" describes an African-American mother and her daughter conversing about a "Freedom March" in the streets of Birmingham. The young child asks permission to participate in the march, but her mother objects and describes the dangers of going to the freedom marchers. Instead, she is sent to church, which is perceived to be a place of safety. Soon, after the daughter leaves for church, an explosion is heard. The mother unfortunately discovers that her daughter’s life has been taken from her in one violent act of racism. Consequently, the mother must accept reality and cope with the loss of her child. Randall in the poem "conjures one of the most vivid and vicious chapters from the civil rights movement: the bombing of a church in 1963 that wounded 21 and cost four girls their lives."
