= Conrad Kent Rivers =

American poet (1933–1968)

- Born: October 15, 1933; Atlantic City, New Jersey, U.S.
- Died: 1968 (aged 35)
- Education: Wilberforce University; Chicago Teachers College; Indiana University
- Occupations: Poet, fiction writer and dramatist

Conrad Kent Rivers (October 15, 1933 – 1968) was an American poet, fiction writer and dramatist.

== Biography ==
Conrad Kent Rivers was born in Atlantic City, New Jersey, to Cora McIver and William Dixon Rivers. He began writing poetry in high school and in 1951 his poem "Poor Peon" won the Savannah, Georgia, State Poetry Prize. He attended Wilberforce University, Chicago Teachers College and Indiana University. He taught high school in Chicago, Illinois, and in Gary, Indiana, while publishing poems in periodicals including the Antioch Review, Negro Digest, and Kenyon Review.

His first book of poetry, Perchance to Dream, Othello, was published in 1959. His second collection, These Black Bodies and This Sunburnt Face, was published in 1962, followed by Dusk at Selma (1965), and The Still Voice of Harlem, which was published a few weeks after Rivers' sudden death in 1968, at the age of 35.

Rivers was part of the Organization of Black American Culture (OBAC), conceived during the era of the Civil Rights Movement as a collective of African-American writers, artists, historians, educators, intellectuals, community activists, a group that included such intellectuals as Hoyt W. Fuller and Gerald McWorter (later Abdul Alkalimat).

A volume of poems written about or dedicated to Richard Wright, The Wright Poems, was published by Paul Breman in 1972.

== Critical appraisal and legacy ==
Frances Smith Foster wrote:

Rivers is generally considered a poet of the black aesthetic and his concern with issues such as racism and violence, black history and black pride, self-love and self-respect are part and parcel of that movement. However, he was also fascinated with traditional poetic forms and techniques and his work evidences the influence of established writers such as his uncle Ray Mclvers, James Weldon Johnson, Langston Hughes, Richard Wright, and James Baldwin.

According to the Dictionary of Literary Biography,

The lasting significance of Conrad Kent Rivers's poetry lay in the fact that he spoke for a generation of young blacks forced to make the transition from the helpless, often hopeless 1950s to the chaotic, rage-filled 1960s. Young blacks, taught in the fifties to contain their individuality for safety's sake, could well understand Rivers's overwhelming concern with loneliness, alienation, and rejection and his responding to the new possibilities of the 1960s with only tentative energy."

=== The Conrad Kent Memorial Award ===
The Conrad Kent Rivers Memorial Award, named in his honour, was first presented to Carolyn Rodgers, as announced in the September 1968 issue of Negro World (later renamed Black World).

== Publications ==
- Perchance to Dream, Othello (1959)
- These Black Bodies and This Sunburnt Face (1962)
- Dusk at Selma (1965)
- The Still Voice of Harlem (1968)
- The Wright Poems (1972)
