= Sterling D. Plumpp =

American poet (born 1940)

- Born: Sterling Dominic Plumpp; January 30, 1940 (age 86); Clinton, Mississippi, United States
- Education: St. Benedict's College; Roosevelt University
- Occupations: Poet and critic
- Employer: University of Illinois Chicago
- Awards: American Book Award

Sterling Dominic Plumpp (born January 30, 1940) is an American poet and critic. He has written numerous books, including Hornman (1996), Harriet Tubman (1996), Ornate With Smoke (1997), Half Black, Half Blacker (1970), and The Mojo Hands Call, I Must Go (1982). Some of his work was included in The Best American Poetry 1996. He was an advisor for the television production of the documentary The Promised Land. Plumpp was awarded the Chicago Literary Hall of Fame's Fuller Award for lifetime achievement in September 2019.

== Life and work ==
Born in Clinton, Mississippi, Plumpp was raised by his maternal grandparents, Mattie and Victor Emmanuel Plumpp, on the cotton plantation where they worked as sharecroppers. Working with them in the fields, Plumpp and his brother did not attend school until they were eight or nine years old and could walk the 10 miles to the school. At the age of 16, Plumpp converted to Catholicism. He won a scholarship to St. Benedict's College in Atchison, Kansas, where he discovered Greek literature and James Baldwin's work, and was inspired to become a writer. He left after two years, and in 1962 traveled north to Chicago, Illinois. There, he found work in a post office. Eventually he enrolled at Roosevelt University, majoring in psychology, while continuing to read widely. He earned a B.A. degree in 1968 and an M.A. in 1971.

Plumpp's first book of poetry, Portable Soul, was published in 1969. Since then, he has edited and contributed to various anthologies, as well as publishing further collections of poetry, and in 1972 a non-fiction work entitled Black Rituals, "about behavior that supports oppression of the Black community". In a February 2022 interview, Plumpp said about Black Rituals:

"I did not want to write a book about Black psychology per se; I simply wanted to culturally account for how the unique African Americans believed and expressed their beliefs. There are times when I am talking about Black beauty as expressed in the Harlem Renaissance and the Black Arts Movement of the 1960s. I was looking for a way to culturally position concepts of beauty and art in the two cultural/literary movements. I wrote Black Rituals at a time when I became intently aware that I am really a Black peasant, a child of the Mississippi soil, baptized in a Saturday-afternoon lake and nourished to a conversionary experience whereby Christ showed me a sign that I had been saved. I was rural. Country folk knew hot dust broiling feet in summers. Somehow I learned to read. I left the South for the North, but I have not lost those southern roots."

His book Clinton won an Illinois Arts Council Literary Award in 1975. He won the Carl Sandburg Literary Prize for poetry for his 1982 book The Mojo Hands Call, I Must Go. The Publishers Weekly review of his 1993 collection, Johannesburg & Other Poems, described Plumpp as "that rarity: a poet who looks with his ears."

His 2014 book, Home/Bass, won an American Book Award for Poetry.

Plumpp took a post teaching African-American studies at the University of Illinois Chicago, in 1971, and went on to become a full professor there, teaching literature and creative writing until he retired with emeritus status in December 2001—having become a $1 million winner in the Illinois Lottery.

The Sterling D. Plumpp Collection, containing works by African and African-American writers, is held at the University of Mississippi.

Plumpp was awarded the Chicago Literary Hall of Fame's Fuller Award for lifetime achievement in September 2019.

== Selected bibliography ==
- Portable Soul, Third World Press, 1969; revised edition, 1974.
- Half Black, Half Blacker, Third World Press, 1970.
- (Contributor) Patricia L. Brown, Don L. Lee, and Francis Ward (eds), To Gwen with Love, Johnson, 1971.
- Muslim Men, Broadside Press, 1972.
- Black Rituals, Third World Press, 1972.
- Steps to Break the Circle, Third World Press, 1974.
- Clinton (poems), Broadside Press, 1976.
- (Editor) Somehow We Survive: An Anthology of South African Writing (illustrations by Dumile Feni), Thunder's Mouth Press, 1981. ISBN 9780938410010
- (Contributor) Joyce Jones, Mary McTaggart, and Maria Mootry (eds), The Otherwise Room, The Poetry Factory Press, 1981.
- The Mojo Hands Call, I Must Go (poems), Thunder's Mouth Press, 1982. ISBN 9780938410041
- Blues: The Story Always Untold (poems), Oak Park, IL: Another Chicago Press, 1989, ISBN 9780961464486
- Johannesburg & Other Poems, Another Chicago Press, 1993, ISBN 9780929968339
- Hornman, Third World Press, 1995
- Harriet Tubman (Adjoa J. Burrowes, illustrator), 1996.
- Ornate With Smoke, Third World Press, 1997, ISBN 9780883781982
- Paul Robeson (a children's book; Adjoa J. Burrowes, illustrator), 1998, ISBN 9780883780657
- Velvet BeBop Kente Cloth, Third World Press, 2001.
- Home/Bass: Poems, 2013

== Awards and honors ==
- 1975: Illinois Arts Council Literary Award
- 1983: Carl Sandburg Literary Award
- 2014: American Book Award for Poetry for Home/Bass
- 2019: Chicago Literary Hall of Fame's Fuller Award for lifetime achievement
