= Dudley Randall =

American poet (1914– 2000)

- Randall in 1972
- Born: January 14, 1914; Washington, D.C., United States
- Died: August 5, 2000 (aged 86); Southfield, Michigan United States
- Education: Wayne State University; University of Michigan
- Occupations: Poet and publisher
- Known for: Founder of Broadside Press; Poet laureate of City of Detroit

Dudley Randall (January 14, 1914 – August 5, 2000) was an African-American poet and poetry publisher from Detroit, Michigan. He founded a pioneering publishing company called Broadside Press in 1965, which published many leading African-American writers, among them Melvin Tolson, Sonia Sanchez, Audre Lorde, Gwendolyn Brooks, Etheridge Knight, Margaret Walker, and others.

Randall's most famous poem is "The Ballad of Birmingham," written in response to the 1963 bombing of the 16th Street Baptist Church in Birmingham, Alabama, in which four girls were killed. Randall's poetry is characterized by simplicity, realism, and what one critic has called the "liberation aesthetic." Other well-known poems of his include "A Poet is not a Jukebox", "Booker T. and W.E.B.", and "The Profile on the Pillow".

== Life ==
Dudley Randall was born on January 14, 1914, in Washington, D.C., the son of Arthur George Clyde (a Congregational Minister) and Ada Viola (Bradley) Randall (a teacher). Randall was the third of five children, including James, Arthur, Esther, and Phillip. His family moved to Detroit in 1920, and he married his first wife Ruby Hands in 1935, and soon after had a daughter, Phyllis Ada. This marriage dissolved, and Randall married Mildred Pinckney in 1942, but this marriage did not last either. In 1957, he married Vivian Spencer.

Randall developed an interest in poetry at a young age. In 1927, at the age of 13, his first published poem, a sonnet, appeared in the Detroit Free Press. The sonnet won the first prize of one dollar on the "Young Poets Page." Early inspiration stemmed from Randall's father taking him and his brothers to hear prominent African-American writers and artists speak, including W. E. B. Du Bois, Walter Francis White, James Weldon Johnson, and others.

After graduating from Eastern High School in 1930, he worked in a foundry of the Ford Motor Company in Dearborn, Michigan, from 1932 to 1937. He also worked as a clerk at a post office in Detroit from 1938 to 1943 and served in the military during World War II. He was working at a post office while attending Wayne State University in Detroit, where he earned a Bachelor of Arts degree in English in 1949. Randall then completed his master's degree in Library Science at the University of Michigan in 1951. He worked as a librarian at Lincoln University in Jefferson City, Missouri, and later at Morgan State College in Baltimore, Maryland. In 1956, he returned to Detroit to work at the Wayne County Federated Library System as head of the reference interlibrary loan department. From 1969 to 1976 Randall was a reference librarian at the University of Detroit (now the University of Detroit Mercy), and served also as the University's Poet-in-Residence. In his honor, the Dudley Randall Poet-in-Residence Award was established in 1971 and is still an annual event at the University as the Dudley Randall Poetry Contest.

== Work ==
In 1966, Broadside Press published Poem Counterpoem, authored by Randall with Margaret Danner, founder of Boone House, a Black cultural center in Detroit where they both read their work. In the words of R. Baxter Miller, "Perhaps the first of its kind, the volume contains ten poems each by Danner and Randall. The poems are alternated to form a kind of double commentary on the subjects they address in common. Replete with allusions to social and intellectual history, the verses stress nurture and growth. In "The Ballad of Birmingham" Randall establishes racial progress as a kind of blossoming, as he recounts the incident." Randall's next publication was Cities Burning (1968), a group of thirteen poems, in response to a riot in Detroit. Another fourteen poems appeared in Love You (1970), followed by More to Remember (1971) and After the Killing (1973).

Naomi Long Madgett writes: "His interest in Russia, apparent in his translations of poems by Aleksander Pushkin ("I Loved You Once", in After the Killing) and Konstantin Simonov ("My Native Land" and "Wait for Me" in A Litany of Friends), was heightened by a visit to the Soviet Union in 1966. His identification with Africa, enhanced by his association with poet Margaret Esse Danner from 1962 to 1964 and study in Ghana in 1970, is evident in such poems as "African Suite" (After the Killing)."

Randall received many awards throughout his career, including:

- 1962 and 1966: the Wayne State Tompkins Award for poetry and for poetry and fiction
- 1973: Kuumba Liberation Award
- 1975: Plaque as Distinguished Alumnus from the University of Michigan
- 1977: International Black Writers' Conference Award
- 1981: Creative Artist Award in Literature, Michigan Council for the Arts

In 1981, Randall was named Poet Laureate of the City of Detroit by Mayor Coleman Young. Randall died on August 5, 2000, aged 86, in Southfield, Michigan. In May 2001, the University of Detroit Mercy's McNichols Campus Library was designated a National Literary Landmark by the Friends of Libraries USA (now the Association of Library Trustees, Advocates, Friends, and Foundations) and UDM's Dudley Randall Center for Print Culture was named in his honor. The Dudley Randall Poetry Prize is awarded to a University of Detroit Mercy student each year.

On January 12, 2014, the centennial of Dudley Randall's birth was celebrated at the University of Detroit Mercy Library. Detroit Poet Laureate Naomi Long Madgett spoke about her friendship and collaborations with Randall. Poet and professor Dr. Gloria House read selections of Dudley Randall's poetry. Poet Albert M. Ward and former Dudley Randall Poetry contest winners Deonte Osayande and Lori Allan read their work.

== Style ==
In a 1976 interview with author Charles H. Rowell, Randall described poetry as “the best words in the best order,” emphasizing that it should be effective on the printed page as well as in oral performance. He cautioned against relying on performance techniques to compensate for weak writing, arguing that the strength of a poem lies in its language and structure. He also stressed that poetry should be written “for the ear,” with attention to sound and lineation. Randall further pointed to the influence of Black oral and folk traditions, particularly their conciseness and clarity, as important models for effective poetry.

== Broadside Press ==
Randall was the publisher of Broadside Press from 1965 until 1977 when he sold the press to the Alexander Crummell Memorial Center, although he continued to serve as a consultant. The press began because Randall wanted to establish copyright on two poems that Jerry Moore was setting to music, "Ballad of Birmingham" and "Dressed All in Pink."

Broadside Press took off in 1965 when, during the Writer's Conference at Fisk University, Randall saw Margaret Walker practicing her recitation of a poem about Malcolm X she was going to perform. When Randall commented on the number of poems being published about Malcolm, Margaret Burroughs suggested the idea of an anthology. Randall and Burroughs communicated their intentions to edit a book of poetry on Malcolm X at the conference, and their fellow poets and publishers responded enthusiastically, some even refusing to be paid for their work.

In 1966, Randall and Margaret Danner, fellow poet and founder of Boone House, published their work Poem Counterpoem through Broadside Press. In May of the same year, Randall attended a conference where he received permission to publish work from Robert Hayden, Melvin B. Tolson, and Margaret Walker in a Broadside series. Randall also received permission from Gwendolyn Brooks to publish her poem "We Real Cool".

Broadside Press published poetry almost exclusively, with more than 400 poets represented and more than 100 books and recordings released. The press has the distinction of being one of the most important literary avenues of the Black Arts Movement, as well as presenting older Black poets (such as Gwendolyn Brooks) and emerging voices (including Nikki Giovanni and Sonia Sanchez) to new readers.

Although Broadside Press went into decline in 1976 due to overworked staff, it still exists to this day.

== Connection to the Black Arts Movement ==
As editor of the Broadside Press, Randall was an important part of the Black Arts Movement (BAM). The aesthetic counterpart of the political drive inherent in the Black Power movement, BAM rejected assimilation in favor of artistic and political freedom. Part of the movements doctrine was a belief in the necessity of militant armed self-defense and the beauty and goodness of Blackness.

The movement's origin is usually traced to March 1965 when, two months after the assassination of Malcolm X, LeRoi Jones (who later changed his name to Amiri Baraka) moved to Harlem. It was Baraka who coined the phrase "Black Arts". The movement had three major forces: the Revolutionary Action Movement (RAM), the Nation of Islam, and the US organization (the "us" used in opposition to "them"). BAM poets were known for an innovative use of language, particularly focusing on orality and the use of Black English, music, and performance for a full-bodied, authentic “black experience” that rejected white literary standards.

Although Randall was a proponent of the freedom BAM offered Black poets, particularly up-and-coming artists, he was not afraid to question what he saw as inherent paradoxes within the movement. For Randall, both the overtly militant aesthetic and the desire to purify poetry of white characteristics were restrictive to the expression of Black artistry. Randall viewed himself as the “guardian of a poetic space out of which black poets may create without restriction."

Randall's interpretation of BAM values are evident in his work. In "A Different Image" the speaker declares that the current political landscape demands that African Americans "create / a different image; / re-animate the mask" (3–6). Because African Americans will still be wearing a mask, the final line of the stanza does not imply that African Americans will be able to show their genuine selves during the Civil Rights Movement, but that the movement requires the image they project to the world to be different than the one they had been showing. The final stanza shows the pride typical of BAM poetry: "Replace / the leer / of the minstrel's burnt-cork face / with a proud, serene / and classic bronze of Benin" (8–12). Thus, African Americans must replace their current image of a weak servant with one of a calm and self-respecting African. As shown in the first stanza, this image may not be entirely genuine, but it will further the desegregation cause of the Civil Rights Movement.

"The Ballad of Birmingham" may help inspire militant action, but it certainly shows the destruction caused by the opposition to the Civil Rights Movement. In the poem, a mother sends her daughter not to the marches but to a church that she believes will be safe. However, the church is bombed (a historical event) and the mother "clawed through bits of glass and brick, / Then lifted out a shoe. / "O, here's the shoe my baby wore, / But, baby, where are you?" (29–32). Published six years after the actual bombing, this poem would remind readers of the pain and death caused by the turmoil of the Civil Rights Movement.

== In popular culture ==
In the third episode ("Kyle") of the NBC television drama This is Us, one of the main characters is renamed "Randall" in explicit tribute to Dudley Randall (who is referred to as the favorite poet of Kyle/Randall's biological father). While the specific tenor of Randall's work is not discussed onscreen, his characteristic themes of Black identity are relevant to the character's identity as a Black child with white adoptive parents. A copy of Randall's Poem, Counterpoem (actually written together with co-author Margaret Danner) becomes a plot point and is glimpsed in this and other episodes. A line attributed to the collection, but actually from Randall's poem "Splendid Against the Night", is quoted by two characters in the seventh episode ("The Best Washing Machine in the World").

== Bibliography ==
=== Poetry collections ===
- Poem Counterpoem, with Margaret Danner (Detroit: Broadside Press, 1966).
- Cities Burning (Detroit: Broadside Press, 1968).
- Love You (London: Paul Breman, 1970).
- More to Remember: Poems of Four Decades (Chicago: Third World Press, 1971).
- After the Killing (Chicago: Third World Press, 1973),
- Broadside Memories: Poets I Have Known (Detroit: Broadside Press, 1975).
- A Litany of Friends: New and Selected Poems (Detroit: Lotus Press, 1981).

=== As editor ===
- For Malcolm: Poems on the Life and the Death of Malcolm X, with Margaret G. Burroughs (Detroit: Broadside Press, 1967).
- Black Poetry: A Supplement to Anthologies Which Exclude Black Poets (Detroit: Broadside Press, 1969).
- The Black Poets (New York: Bantam, 1971).
- Golden Song: The Fiftieth Anniversary Anthology of the Poetry Society of Michigan, with Louis J. Cantoni (Detroit: Harlo, 1985).
