= Haki R. Madhubuti =

American poet and publisher (born 1942)

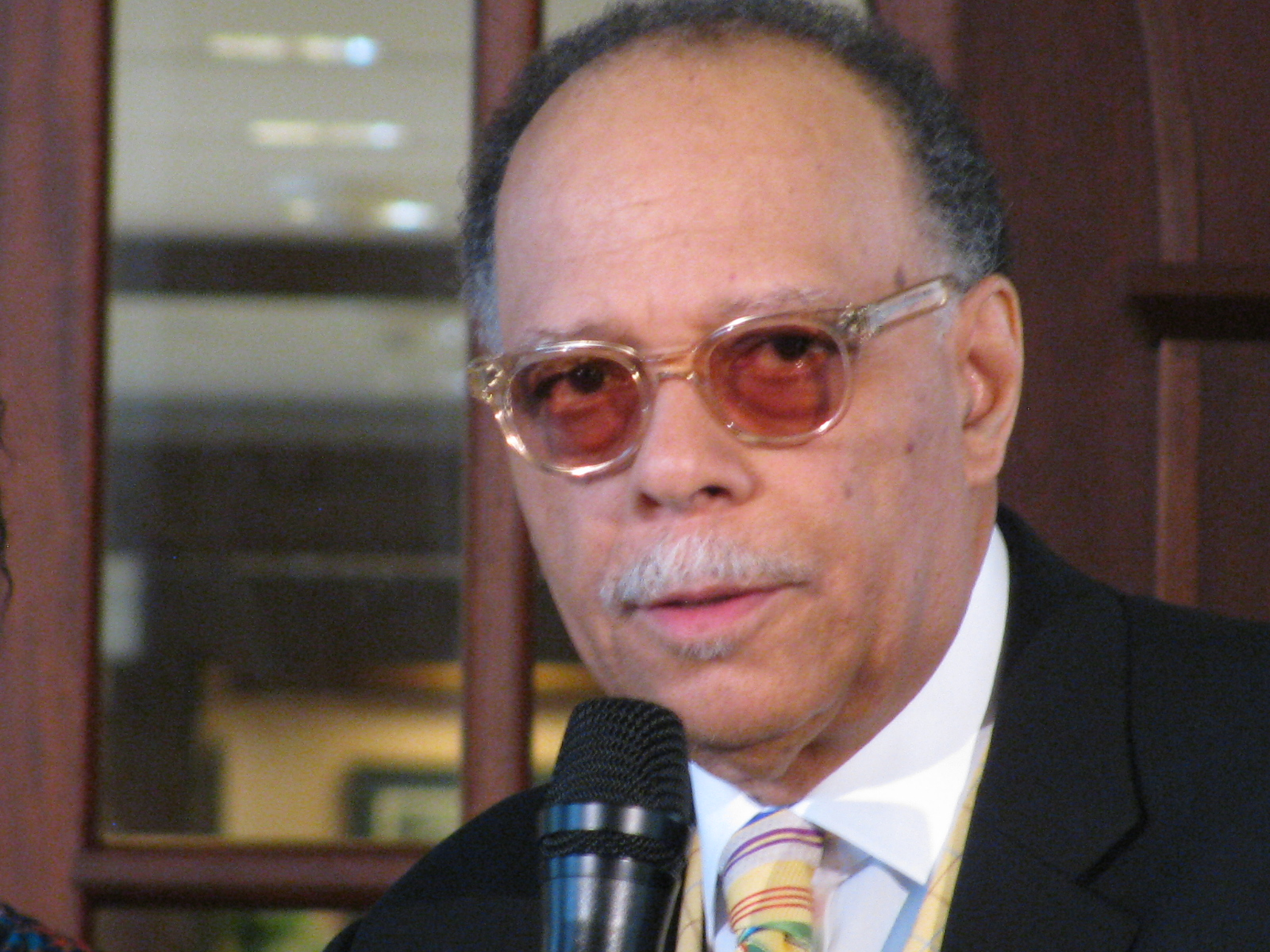
- Born: Don Luther Lee; February 23, 1942 (age 84); Little Rock, Arkansas, United States
- Other name: Don L. Lee
- Education: Iowa Writers' Workshop at University of Iowa (MFA)
- Occupations: Poet; Author; Publisher
- Known for: Third World Press
- Movement: Black Arts Movement
- Spouse: Safisha Madhubuti
- Awards: American Book Award

Haki R. Madhubuti (born Don Luther Lee on February 23, 1942) is an African-American author, educator, and poet, as well as a publisher and operator of black-themed bookstores. He is particularly recognized for co-founding Third World Press in 1967, considered the oldest independent black publishing house in the United States.

As a poet and lecturer, Madhubuti has convened workshops and served as guest or keynote speaker at colleges, universities, libraries, and community centers in the U.S. and abroad.

The name Haki means "just" or "justice," and Madhubuti means "precise, accurate and dependable," both names deriving from the Swahili language. He changed his name in 1974.

== Biography ==
=== Early years and education ===
Born Donald Luther Lee in Little Rock, Arkansas, Madhubuti adopted his Swahili name after visiting Africa in 1974. He was raised in Detroit, Michigan, with his mother until the age of 16, when she was murdered. His mother, Maxine, was the prime force behind his creativity and interest in black literature and arts. After serving in the United States Army from 1960 to 1963, Madhubuti received a Master of Fine Arts degree from the Iowa Writers' Workshop at the University of Iowa in 1984.

=== Black Arts Movement and Third World Press ===
At an early age, Madhubuti became deeply interested in and influenced by Black Arts Movement (BAM) figures such as writer Richard Wright. Madhubuti is a major contributor to the black literary tradition, in particular through his early association with the BAM beginning in the mid-1960s, and has had a lasting and major impact. Recognizing the lack of resources and institutions dedicated to black scholars, Madhubuti became a leading proponent of independent Black institutions.

In December 1967, Madhubuti met with Carolyn Rodgers and Johari Amini in the basement of a South Side Chicago apartment to found Third World Press, an outlet for African-American literature. He is also a publisher and chair of the board. It is the largest independent black publishing house in the U.S. Over the years, the press has published works by Gwendolyn Brooks, Amiri Baraka, Sonia Sanchez, Sterling D. Plumpp, and Pearl Cleage.

== Writing ==
Heavily influenced by Gwendolyn Brooks, Madhubuti's poetry is marked by a rhythmic, experimental style, frequently in free verse. Madhubuti's poetry shifted from the personal to the political over the span of his career. He has dedicated a number of poems to Brooks and is the founder and director emeritus of the Gwendolyn Brooks Center for Black Literature and Creative Writing.

He has published over 35 books (some under his former name, Don L. Lee) and is one of the world's best-selling authors of poetry and non-fiction, with books in print in excess of 3 million. His books include Claiming Earth: Race, Rage, Rape, Redemption (1994), GroundWork: New and Selected Poems 1966–1996 (1996), and HeartLove: Wedding and Love Poems (1998).

Madhubuti has co-edited two volumes of literary works from Gallery 37: The Spirit (1998) and Describe the Moment (2000). His poetry and essays have been published in more than 100 anthologies. He also wrote Tough Notes: A Healing Call For Creating Exceptional Black Men (2002). Possibly his most famous work, Black Men: Obsolete, Single, Dangerous?: The African American Family in Transition, a nonfiction book about African-American social issues, was published in 1990 and has sold more than 1,000,000 copies.

== Other initiatives ==
Madhubuti co-founded the Black Books Bulletin (with Larry Neal), the Institute of Positive Education/New Concept Development Center (established in 1969), and the Betty Shabazz International Charter School (established in 1998) in Chicago, Illinois. He is also a founder and board member of the National Association of Black Book Publishers, a founder and chair of the board of the International Literary Hall of Fame for Writers of African Descent, and founder and director of the National Black Writers Retreat. Prior to stepping down, Madhubuti held the position of Distinguished University Professor, co-founder and director emeritus of the Gwendolyn Brooks Center for Black Literature and Creative Writing, and director of the Master of Fine Arts in Creative Writing program at Chicago State University.

== Personal life ==
Madhubuti's 2005 book, Yellow Black, is an autobiographical novel detailing the first 21 years of his life. He lives in Chicago with his wife Safisha Madhubuti, professor emeritus at Northwestern University.

== Awards and honors ==
Madhubuti has received the Distinguished Writers Award from the Middle Atlantic Writers Association (1984), the American Book Award (1991), the Paul Robeson Award from the African-American Arts Alliance (1993), and fellowships from the National Endowment for the Arts and the National Endowment for the Humanities.

== Selected publications ==
- Dynamite Voices I: Black Poets of the 1960s (Broadside Press, 1971)
- (Editor, with Patricia L. Brown and Francis Ward) To Gwen with Love (Johnson Publishing Company, 1971)
- Book of Life (Broadside Press, 1973)
- Killing Memory, Seeking Ancestors (Lotus Press, 1987)
- Black Men: Obsolete, Single, Dangerous?: The African American Family in Transition (Third World Press, 1990)
- Claiming Earth: Race, Rage, Rape, Redemption (Third World Press, 1994)
- GroundWork: New and Selected Poems 1966–1996 (Third World Press, 1996)
- (Editor, with Maulana Karenga) Million Man March/Day of Absence: A Commemorative Anthology (Third World Press, 1996)
- HeartLove: Wedding and Love Poems (Chicago: Third World Press, 1998)
- Tough Notes: A Healing Call for Creating Exceptional Black Men: Affırmations, Meditations, Readings, and Strategies (Third World Press, 2002)
- Yellow Black: The First Twenty-One Years of a Poet's Life (Third World Press, 2005)
- Taking Bullets: Black Boys and Men in Twenty-first Century America, Fighting Terrorism, Stopping Violence and Seeking Healing (Third World Press, 2016)
- (Editor, with Michael Simanga, Sonia Sanchez, and Woodie King), Brilliant Flame! Amiri Baraka: Poems, Plays, Politics for the People (Third World Press, 2018)
- (Editor, with Herb Boyd) Black Panther: Paradigm Shift or Not? (Third World Press, 2019)
- Taught by Women: Poems as Resistance Language: New and Selected (Third World Press, 2020)
- (Editor, with Marc Lamont Hill and Keith Gilyard) For Gaza's Children: Progressive Black, Brown, and Jewish Writers and Poets Speak Out (Third World Press, 2024)

== Interviews ==
- "Haki Madhubuti interview". Evening of Poetry at Hopkins House. October 6, 2006. Archived from the original on August 13, 2007.
- "An Interview with Haki R. Madhubuti: Taught by Women & other Writers". Moraine Valley Community College Library, February 18, 2021.
- "In Conversation with Renowned Poet Haki Madhubuti", Augustana College, March 5, 2024.
- "Giant of the Black Arts Movement - Dr. Haki Madhubuti", ASAHL TV, April 1, 2024.
