= Hoyt W. Fuller =

American editor, educator, critic, and author

Hoyt W. Fuller (September 10, 1923 – May 11, 1981) was an American editor, educator, critic, and author during the Black Arts Movement. Fuller created the Organization of Black American Culture in Chicago. In addition, he taught creative writing and African-American literature at Columbia College Chicago, Northwestern University, and Cornell University.

== Biography ==
Hoyt William Fuller was born in Atlanta, Georgia. In 1927, his mother, Lillie Beatrice Ellafair Thomas, fell ill to a disease that caused her to become an invalid before bringing about her death. Shortly afterwards in the same year Fuller's father, Thomas Fuller, died. Fuller went to live with his aunt in Detroit, Michigan, following the death of his parents. He frequently returned to Atlanta to visit his grandmother, who encouraged him to explore African-American culture.

Fuller graduated from Wayne State University in 1950, with a bachelor's degree in literature and journalism. Fred Williams, a local amateur historian of Detroit's black community, became Fuller's mentor while he attended Wayne State. Aside from giving Fuller readings about Africa and African Americans, Williams also took him on his research trips to interview older members of the black community. After graduating, Fuller pursued a career in journalism. He worked at the Detroit Tribune (1949–51), the Michigan Chronicle (1951–54), and Ebony magazine (1954–57).

Becoming frustrated with the disconnect between Ebony’s content and the struggle for black freedom, he quit his position as the magazine's associate editor in 1957. In his autobiographical work Journey to Africa (1971), he describes his inability to find employment thereafter and his anger at the racially oppressive culture of America. As a result, Fuller moved to Europe, living for three years (1957 to 1960) on Mallorca. While in Mallorca, he wrote about West Africa for the Amsterdam Haagse Post. He spent three months in Algiers and Guinea, an experience that inspired him to write Journey to Africa.

Fuller's experiences in Africa gave him a new sense of purpose and led him to return to the United States in 1960. No longer concerned with reforming white American racial beliefs, he focused his attention on black America. He believed that African and African-American culture would inspire black Americans to take action against racial oppression and contribute to more confident expressions of their own identity. Robert Joseph Collier Encyclopedia hired Fuller as associate editor in 1960. In 1961, he became editor of The Negro Digest, resurrecting the publication after a 10-year hiatus. Fuller, unsatisfied with the digest format of the magazine, changed it to Black World in 1970. Negro Digest/Black World was devoted to black culture and arts and became an important platform for many Black Arts Movement writers. While being inspirational for many black authors at the time, Fuller was famously critical of Ralph Ellison for his lack of political fervor in his literature. When the publication was discontinued in 1976, Fuller moved to Atlanta and founded the journal First World (1977–80). He wrote articles, under the pseudonym of William Barrow, for publications including The New Yorker, The New Republic and the Christian Science Monitor.

Fuller worked at several universities, including Cornell University and Northwestern University. He visited Africa again in 1965–66 as a John Hay Whitney Opportunity Fellow. He also helped organize several Pan-African festivals and formed the Chicago Organization of Black American Culture, a writers’ group. In 1981, Fuller died of a heart attack in Atlanta.

== Works ==
- Journey To Africa (1971)
- The Turning of the Wheel, Or, Are Black Men Serious (1972)

== Relevant literature ==
- Fenderson, Jonathan. 2019. Building the Black Arts Movement: Hoyt Fuller and the Cultural Politics of the 1960s. University of Illinois Press.
