= Lapeyrouse =

Lapeyrouse may refer to:

== Places ==
Lapeyrouse is the name or part of the name of several communes in France:

- Lapeyrouse, Ain
- Lapeyrouse, Puy-de-Dôme
- Lapeyrouse-Fossat, in the Haute-Garonne département
- Lapeyrouse-Mornay, in the Drôme département

== People ==
Stephen Lapeyrouse (b. 1952) is an American author, essayist, journalist and ELE public forum host in Moscow, Russia.
