= Jeff Parker (writer) =

American novelist and short story writer (born 1974)

- Born: January 3, 1974 (age 52)
- Education: University of Florida (BS); Syracuse University (MFA)
- Occupations: Novelist; short story writer

Jeff Parker (born January 3, 1974) is an American novelist and short story writer. His novel Ovenman was published in 2007 by the book division of the literary journal Tin House. Parker received praise from within the literary community for his hypertext story A Long Wild Smile which has appeared in numerous online journals.

== Biography ==
Parker grew up in Tallahassee, Florida, and received a B.S. in Journalism from the University of Florida. He attended the prestigious creative writing program at Syracuse University where he studied with such writers as George Saunders and Arthur Flowers. During his time in Syracuse he lived briefly with the poet Kevin Keck who later dedicated his first collection of stories to him. Parker graduated with an M.F.A. in creative writing in 1999. He previously served as a faculty member at the University of Toronto, lectured in Russian State University for the Humanities and ELE public forum in Moscow, and served as the director of the Creative Writing M.F.A. at the University of Tampa. He is currently a member of University of Massachusetts Amherst's M.F.A. faculty and Director of Disquiet International Literary Program.

== Bibliography ==
- 2004 Amerika: Russian Writers View the United States (as co-editor). Dalkey Archive Press. ISBN 1-56478-356-1
- 2004 Life & Limb: Skateboarders Writer from the Deep End (novel excerpt). Brooklyn, New York: Soft Skull Press. ISBN 1-932360-28-X
- 2007 The Back of the Line Decode, Inc. ISBN 978-0979337307
- 2007 Ovenman (novel) Portland, OR: Tin House Books. ISBN 978-0-9776989-2-9
- 2009 Rasskazy: New Fiction From a New Russia (as co-editor) Portland, OR: Tin House Books. ISBN 978-0-9820539-0-4
- 2010 The Taste of Penny Dzanc Books. ISBN 978-0982520444
- 2014 Sankya (as Translator) DISQUIET. ISBN 978-1938604515
- 2015 Where Bears Roam the Streets Harper Perennial. ISBN 978-1554683826
- 2015 Erratic Fire, Erratic Passion Featherproof Books. ISBN 978-0983186342
- 2015 A Manner of Being University of Massachusetts Press. ISBN 978-1625341822
