= Mildred Grossman =

American educator, civil rights activist, unionist, and photographer (1916–1988)

Mildred Grossman (1916–1988) was a New York City public school teacher, civil rights activist, unionist, and a photographer associated with the Photo League. She led 32 other teachers in a civil case against the New York City Public Schools and the state's McCarthy-era Feinberg ‘loyalty’ Law.

== Education and membership of the Teachers Union ==
Mildred Grossman was born in Brooklyn, New York, in 1916 eldest daughter of Lewis J. and Maybella Grossman, and sister of Mitchell, Henrietta and Leonard. She studied Business Administration and in 1937 earned a bachelor's degree with a Teaching Certificate from the College of Business and Accounting of the City College of New York. There, as President of the Girls Club in 1935, she was notable for her campaign to secure readmission of women banned from studying at the college, the formation of a student union and defense of academic freedom, and a youth allowance for needy students. While studying, she worked at Coty Cosmetics in Manhattan. In 1939 she attended NYS Communist Party summer school before beginning teaching in business accounting at Central Commercial High School in Manhattan. She became active in the Teachers Union of New York and a member of the American Labor Party.

== Photographer ==
In the late 1940s she joined the Photo League of NY, taking classes in documentary and street photography, subsequently being given work as staff photographer for Teacher News, the publication of the Teachers' Union. She photographed the annual Teachers Union Educational Conferences at the Waldorf-Astoria and the Academic Freedom rallies. Her subjects included speakers playwright Arthur Miller and blacklisted screenwriter Dalton Trumbo, and she recorded educator/activist, Dr. W.E.B. Du Bois and actor/activist Paul Robeson receiving the TU's Award for Distinguished Service in the Cause of Education for Peace and Freedom.

When teachers demonstrated in Albany over poor salaries, Grossman was present, and she recorded rallies in Washington for allied unions, and protests in New York City against unfair labor practices that included the Timone Resolution, which threatened both the TU and individual teachers who expressed their personal political beliefs.

== Red Scare and activism ==
The union actions Grossman documented were a response to the 1940 'Little Red Scare', which saw twenty-one states impose ‘loyalty oaths’ on teachers before, by 1946, fifteen more states had joined them. The House Un-American Activities Committee, supported at times by military authorities, inspected public school and college textbooks and curricula to ensure that the authors, even those long deceased, had 'disclaimed Communism'. New York's State Senator Frederic Coudert in 1940 scoured schools for "subversives", leading to the dismissal of professors without regard for their value and record as teachers.

Post-war, the purge instituted in New York in the state's 1949 Feinberg Law (Named after its sponsor, state senator Benjamin Feinberg) requiring school districts to report on the loyalty of every teacher, annually, targeted left-wing leaders of the city's Teachers Union. A teacher's membership in ‘subversive’ organisations, including “writing of articles, the distribution of pamphlets, endorsement of speeches made or articles written or acts performed by others”, would be designated ‘disloyal’ by the state commissioner of education. By 1950, leaders of the New York City Teachers Union were being dismissed through these proceedings, provoking fear of ramping job losses that affected membership; Teachers Union numbers fell from 7,000 in 1946 to 2,000 by the end of the 1950 school year, enabling the New York City Board of Education to withdraw recognition.

Mildred Grossman was subject to investigation and in 1953 was named as a former Communist at HUAC assistant corporation counsel Saul Moskoff's interrogation conducted in an old warehouse without legal representation. Grossman fought back by directing the Talmudic admonitions of the ‘moser’ (informer) as ammunition against Saul Moskoff, a practicing Jew and first vice president of Congregation Agudas Israel, sending a letter to the members of his congregation citing a resolution against the "Informer Resolution" adopted by the New York Board of Rabbis. Moskoff, however, recruited his own rabbis to offer their interpretation, though Rabbi Sharfman warned Moskoff his opponents could most certainly produce Talmudic interpretation from another rabbi to the contrary. Nevertheless, when she refused to answer part of the Superintendent's question concerning past and present membership in the CP, she was first suspended from her teaching position, and after twelve years as a teacher, was dismissed, with 38 other NYC teachers, in April 1954 for “insubordination and conduct unbecoming” and the Board of Education's determination, in accordance with New York State's Feinberg Law, that she had not satisfactorily severed her ties to the Communist Party. 283 others resigned or retired to escape the ordeal, with one elementary teacher, recently bereaved of her husband, committing suicide. Grossman's 1955 appeal against her dismissal was denied by the State Commissioner of Education.

== Recognition for photography ==
In the same year, two of Grossman's photographs appeared in the world-touring Museum of Modern Art exhibition The Family of Man selected by Edward Steichen and seen by 9 million visitors. One shows an elderly couple promenading on a city street, their identical poses representing habituation in a long-term marriage. The subject of her other photograph, taken in Germany, is a grandmother's gleefully reciprocated pride in her grandchild. Steichen also included Grossman's works in the 1957 MoMA show Seventy photographers look at New York.

Barred from teaching but buoyed by this recognition, Grossman switched careers to begin freelancing as a photographer, working for the New York Hotel Trades Council, and for the Hotel Workers Local #6 in NYC, photographing their members on the job, as they participated in union elections, on the strike line, and at the Union hall. Her now historic pictures appeared in Union publications and displayed in her art exhibit Portrait of a Union.

She met Dr Martin Luther King in the union offices in 1957 and in support of civil rights she produced reportage on the Little Rock Nine, the first African-American students to attend an integrated school, Little Rock Central High, in Arkansas in September, 1957, as part of the initiative to desegregate Southern schools. Subjected to discrimination, harassment, and violence by their white classmates, they became iconic of African-Americans’ struggle for equality. Grossman photographed them in the summer of 1958, when they met with union leaders, diplomats, and elected officials honoring their courage and achievements. The New York Hotel Workers’ Union flew the Little Rock Nine students to New York and presented them with the Better Race Relations Award.

Grossman's photographs show the students as they visit the Statue of Liberty, the United Nations Headquarters, City Hall, the Local 6 Civil Rights Award Ceremony, and the Coney Island theme parks. One member of the group, Carlotta Walls LaNier recalls in interview with Lisa Frazier Page in A mighty long way: my journey to justice at Little Rock Central High School, that;

We were even accompanied by the union's photographer, Mildred Grossman, a tiny lady who didn't seem at all weighed down by the ton of photo equipment she lugged around. She seemed different from the other professional photographers we had encountered. She tried not to be intrusive, though she snapped photos at every turn. In later years, when l learned her history, I would understand why she seemed so empathetic toward us. She knew what it was like to be singled out unjustly.”

== Later career ==
Grossman continued her work as a union activist, photographer, and teacher until her death from cancer in 1988. In 1958 Grossman married Motel "Mark" Berkowitz, a Holocaust survivor with whom, in 1965, she traveled to Poland, his homeland. The next year she won a Polish competition with her image Strike Rally. She had previously, in 1960, won 'America's Many Faces', sponsored by the National Urban League. She photographed for the Poor People's Campaign in 1968 and contributed photos to The New Movement: Power for the Powerless.

In 1967, the Feinberg Law was ruled unconstitutional by the Supreme Court and Grossman led a group of teachers to seek reinstatement, but it was not until 1972 that they successfully sued to regain their jobs. In the meantime, during 1971 Grossman worked between freelance photography, social work and teaching photography, before finally, at age 58, returning after 21 years to her secondary teaching post at Central Commercial High School in 1974–75, her hard-won campaign against laws obstructing academic freedom vindicated. Even in her sixties, she fought for others as head of the tenants' union in her building.

== Legacy ==
Grossman was represented in Fields of Vision: Women in Photography (1995) and Eye of the Storm: Photographs by Mildred Grossman, published posthumously in 1999 by the University of Maryland, Baltimore County, is a record of her life as an educator, photographer, and civil rights activist.

== Exhibitions ==
- The Family of Man, January 24 - May 8, 1955, US, NY, New York
- Seventy Photographers Look at New York, November 27, 1957 - April 15, 1958, US, NY, New York
- Photography At Mid-Century: 10th Anniversary Exhibition, November 9, 1959 - January, 1960, US, NY, Rochester
- Fields of Vision: Women in Photography. Baltimore: Albin O. Kuhn Library & Gallery, University of Maryland, 1995.
- Eye of the Storm: Photographs by Mildred Grossman, February 8 - April 10, 1999, Baltimore, University of Maryland, Baltimore County.

== Collections ==
- Mildred Grossman papers, 1929-1995 at the University of Maryland, Baltimore County
- New York Public Library, New York, NY 10018-2788, US
