= Grace Edwards =

Grace Edwards may refer to:

- Grace F. Edwards (1933–2020), American mystery writer
- Grace Edwards (producer), Guyanese-American producer, screenwriter, and actress
- Grace Edwards (American actress), American actress
