= Office of Commercial Space Transportation =

Branch of the US FAA

The Office of Commercial Space Transportation (generally referred to as FAA/AST or simply AST (Note: "AST" is the FAA routing symbol assigned to the Office of Commercial Space Transportation. See FAA Order 1100.87F - Routing Symbol Standards.)) is the branch of the United States Federal Aviation Administration (FAA) that approves any commercial rocket launch operations — that is, any launches that are not classified as model, amateur, or "by and for the government" — in the case of a U.S. launch operator and/or a launch from the U.S.

== History ==
With the signing of Executive Order 12465 on February 25, 1984, President Reagan designated the Department of Transportation to be the lead agency for commercial expendable launch vehicles. This selection occurred following an interagency competition between the Departments of Commerce and Transportation to be the lead agency. At the time, Congress and the industry supported the Department of Commerce for the lead role, and draft legislation named the Department of Commerce as the agency responsible for the new industry. However, it was the Administration's call, and, moreover, the Administration contended that no legislation was necessary. However, the Department of Transportation was selected for this role only after agreeing that it would not place the lead agency role in the Federal Aviation Administration due to concerns about FAA's "heavy-handed" regulation. Secretary of Transportation Elizabeth Dole selected Jennifer Dorn to oversee the new responsibility. The Office of Commercial Space Transportation (OCST) was established in late 1984, and placed in the Office of the Secretary.

At the time the Executive Order was signed, the government's means for controlling commercial launches was through a unique application of the International Traffic in Arms Regulations (ITAR). The use of ITAR was in response to a 1982 proposed private rocket launch by Space Services, Inc. Specifically, SSI's launch had been declared by the US government to be an "export" into space, thereby requiring an "export license" from the Department of State's Office of Munitions Control. The Administration continued to oppose legislation, however, the Department Of Transportation negotiated an arrangement whereby the Department of State would agree to delegate to DOT the authority to use the ITAR "export license" insofar as it related to licensing commercial space launches. The DOS letter agreeing to this transfer also stated that the Department of State felt uncomfortable with the use of the "export license" as a means to control commercial launches, and that it believed that a legal authority specifically designed for commercial space launches was preferable. This letter from the State Department to the Secretary of Transportation persuaded the Reagan administration to change its position regarding the need for legislation, and paved the way for passage of the Commercial Space Launch Act of 1984.

The first 10 years of OCST were marked by major challenges—and most of these challenges fell into either the policy or regulatory arena. Accordingly, the Office of Commercial Space Transportation was divided into two major functions, policy formulation and shuttle pricing strategy, headed by Donald Trilling, and regulatory oversight, headed by Norman Bowles. The new industry was immediately confronting problems. Starstruck was stuck in the Department of State's export licensing process. Commercial launch firms were being undercut by NASA's shuttle pricing policy. Launch companies discovered that insurance rates that NASA and the US Air Force were setting were impossible to meet. Then launch companies confronted problems with trying to use the government launch facilities. Over the course of several years, these issues emerged and were quickly resolved. OCST established its reputation within the space community that it could create the hospitable path the industry needed to grow and flourish.

Interim regulations implementing the Commercial Space Launch Act were issued within a year of the Act's passage and final regulations were issued a year later. The licensing framework created at that time was modular and designed to handle any type of space vehicle or spacecraft. At the time it was designed based on the most modern regulatory principles. The regulatory approach was based on the assumption that the era of traditional expendable launch vehicles would be brief and that before long, new, different designs would emerge; this was not a view held by the traditional space community. This turned out to be true, more than OCST had envisioned. The first Office of Commercial Space Transportation regulatory action was a precedent setting payload approval of "cremains", which consisted of human cremated remains enclosed in lipstick style capsules. Within the first 8 years, 30 licensed launches would occur (31 if one includes Starstruck) and an innovative aircraft launched vehicle would be licensed and a re-entry vehicle approval action would be well underway. A review of Hawaii's Palima Point as a prospective spaceport location had been completed (although political factors had caused the state to drop its proposal) and two other states had approached OCST with prospective proposals. The concept that the license process had to look forward to new concepts had been validated.

Between 1984 and 1992 the OCST regulatory program had taken an aggressive approach to building a program that anticipated future issues and had taken actions to reduce or eliminate future stumbling blocks. From the very beginning it prepared environmental impact statements or assessments that permitted the categorical exclusion of commercial space launches. Before the first re-entry vehicle it had completed an environmental study of re-entry vehicle operation. OCST's Launch Hazard Analysis report issued in 1988 had even studied the risks of reentering vehicle components to the public safety, paving the way for subsequent reentry vehicle proposals. Proactively, it approached the National Transportation Safety Board to ensure NTSBs investigators would be prepared in advance of an incident or accident.

As part of an effort to ensure OCST maintained a light regulatory touch, in 1991 OCST Director Stephanie Lee-Myers and associate director for Licensing and Safety, Norman Bowles met with Burt Rutan, pre-eminent air plane designer to get his views on how to avoid over-regulating the commercial launch industry. Burt Rutan informed Lee-Myers and Bowles that he knew nothing about space, and was not entertaining any thoughts of going into the space launch business. Less than 10 years later, his vehicle SpaceShipOne would win the Ansari XPrize as the first privately crewed vehicle to fly into outer space.

In 1984, OCST had made its motto, "Blue skies; not red tape." By 1992, OCST had completed two studies that were beginning to explore the concept of industry self-regulation. Previous studies had demonstrated that the public safety risks from commercial space launches were exceptionally low.

Early in the Clinton administration, the office was transferred to the Federal Aviation Administration in 1995 during the tenure of OCST Director Frank Weaver. After Frank Weaver, the office was headed by Patti Grace Smith until 2008. Under her administration, the F.A.A. licensed the Mojave Air & Space Port in California to become the first inland commercial spaceport in the country. SpaceShipOne, the first privately developed crewed vehicle to reach space, was launched from this facility in 2004.

In August 2019, the office had 97 personnel assigned out of 108 positions authorized. The increase in commercial space launches and reentries in recent years—licensing 33 to 44 launches in 2019 vs. "single-digit number of launches annually" in earlier years, and anticipating up to 50 launches in 2021 with a projected ten-fold workload increase ten-fold from 2012.

== Overview ==
Under international law, the nationality of the launch operator and the location of the launch determines which country is responsible for any damage that occurs. Due to this, the United States requires that rocket manufacturers and launchers adhere to specific regulations to carry insurance and protect the safety of people and property that may be affected by a flight. The office also regulates launch sites, publishes quarterly launch forecasts, and holds annual conferences with the space launch industry. The office is headed by the Associate Administrator for Commercial Space Transportation (FAA/AST), who is currently Kelvin Coleman. They are located in Washington, DC, and ultimately operate under the Department of Transportation.

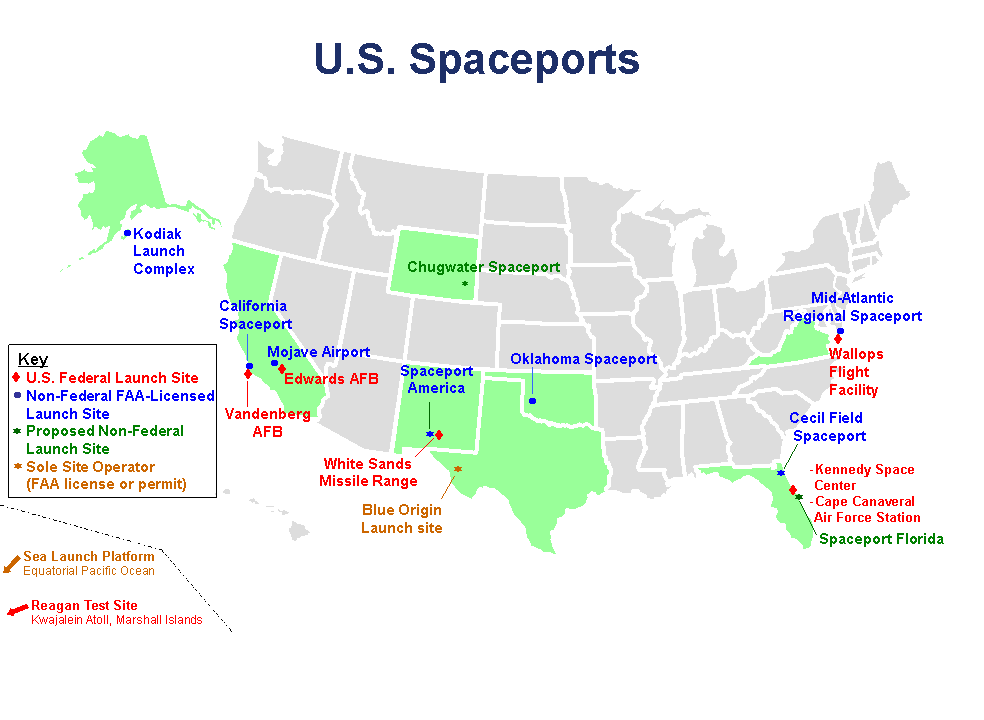
A map of all licensed spaceports in the US, as of February 2010

AST is responsible for licensing private space vehicles and spaceports within the US. This is in contrast with NASA, which is a research and development agency of the U.S. Federal Government, and as such neither operates nor regulates the commercial space transportation industry. The regulatory responsibility for the industry has been assigned to the Federal Aviation Administration, which is a regulatory agency. NASA does, however, often use launch satellites and spacecraft on vehicles developed by private companies.

According to its legal mandate, AST has the responsibility to:

- regulate the commercial space transportation industry, only to the extent necessary to ensure compliance with international obligations of the United States and to protect the public health and safety, safety of property, and national security and foreign policy interest of the United States;
- encourage, facilitate, and promote commercial space launches by the private sector;
- recommend appropriate changes in Federal statutes, treaties, regulations, policies, plans, and procedures; and
- facilitate the strengthening and expansion of the United States space transportation infrastructure.

== Organization ==
AST is organized into five divisions:

- Safety Authorization Division (ASA-100)
- Safety Analysis Division (ASA-200)
- Safety Assurance Division (ASA-300)
- Business Operations Division (ASZ-100)
- Policy and Innovation Division (ASZ-200)

== Launch regulation ==
The primary responsibility of OCST has been to regulate non-government space launches in the United States. As of 2020, this remains their largest focus.

=== Rocket categories ===
For a vehicle to legally be considered a rocket, its "thrust must be greater than lift for the majority of powered flight". Commercial rockets fall into two basic categories: Amateur and Licensed.

==== Amateur ====
An amateur rocket has a total impulse of 200,000 lb-s or less, and cannot reach an altitude of 150 km above sea level. If a rocket exceeds these capabilities (or if it has a person on board), it is considered licensable.

Amateur rockets come in 3 classes, and the regulations applied to each class increase as you move up through the classes. The following list describes the general regulations.

Class 1—Model Rockets do not require approval to be launched, and are legal so long as they are launched in a safe manner.

Class 2—High-Power Rockets require approval to enter National Airspace. Information regarding the rocket and where it will be launched must be provided to obtain this approval.

Class 3—Advanced High-Power Rockets require approval to enter National Airspace. More advanced information about the rocket (such as the dynamic stability profile) and operations is required to obtain this approval.

Once a rocket exceeds amateur rocket criteria, it is considered "Licensed," which means it requires either a License or Experimental Permit in order to fly.

Experimental Permits are authorizations given to reusable rockets to fly in a specific area, called the "Operating Area." This authorization is optional, but it is easier to obtain than a license. It is easier because unlike a license, an experimental permit does not require an Expected Casualty analysis, nor a full System Safety Process. However, the permit is also more limited. Among other things, a permitted rocket cannot be used to carry people or things for compensation. Examples of permitted rockets include all participants in the X Prize Cup.

==== Licensed launch vehicles ====
A Licensed Rocket encompasses all other commercial rockets, including anything non-amateur, orbital, or large expendable launch vehicles (ELVs). Examples of licensed rockets would include all Atlas, Delta, and Titan rockets. These rockets are subject to the US Code of Federal Regulations (14 C.F.R., Chapter III, §400-460).. Launches that are by and for the government are exempted from this regulation. NASA's shuttle and military rockets, for example, do not require a license to launch. (They are required to meet NASA and Air Force regulations instead.) A Commercial Launch License must be obtained from FAA/AST before any rocket in this category may be launched from any US territory or if launch is conducted by a U.S. citizen.

==== Launch site operations ====
Launch sites, in addition to the launch vehicles that operate there, must also receive authorization from AST. The launch site regulations are contained in Part 420.

=== General requirements ===
In general, when licensing launch operations, AST uses a 3-pronged approach to safety: Quantitative Analysis, System Safety Process, and Operating Restrictions.

==== Quantitative analysis ====
AST will generally require that the operator perform what's known as an "E_{c} Analysis." E_{c} ("Eee-sub-cee") is shorthand for Expected Casualty – a calculation of the probability of casualty to any and all groups of people within the maximum dispersion of the vehicle. In the simplest case, a rocket will have containment, which means that there are no people or property located within the maximum range of the vehicle. Most rockets, however, cannot achieve containment, and must be regulated using a risk-based approach.

A calculation of risk takes into account various failure modes of the rocket, various locations of the people, various shelters in which they reside, and various manners in which they can be hurt (direct impact, blast overpressure, toxic cloud, etc.). The calculation is very involved, even for relatively small rockets. In all cases, the assumptions in the calculation become the limits on the day of launch. For example, if a vehicle is analyzed for malfunction turn due to thrust offset, and the assumed wind in the model is 30 knots (56 km/h), then one of the GO/NO GO criteria on the day of launch will be a <30 knot wind. For AST, as it is with most government agencies, Unknown = No.

==== System Safety Process ====
Certain rockets are hard to quantify in an analysis. Newer vehicles especially do not have the history required to demonstrate reliability, and thus the uncertainty in quantitative analyses can be substantial. In all cases, but especially in cases where quantitative uncertainty is at a maximum, AST will require that the launch operator follow a System Safety Process.

A System Safety Process (SSP) can come in many forms, and generally involves "Top-Down" analyses (such as Fault Trees), "Bottom-Up" analyses (such as a Hazard Analysis or Failure Modes & Effects Analysis (FMEA)), and various other analyses as required (Fishbone). Rocket systems, failure modes, external hazards, and everything else are analyzed with an eye towards public safety. From these systematic analyses, mitigation measures - or actions taken to reduce the risk - are developed. Just as in the quantitative analysis, these mitigation measures become GO/NO GO criteria on the day of launch. AST will generally require verification (evidence of an operator using mitigation measures) for every safety-critical system on the vehicle.

==== Operating restrictions ====
In addition to all the operating restrictions developed in the quantitative analyses and system safety processes, AST requires other restrictions be followed. These are described in the Code of Federal Regulations. An example of an operating restriction is a Collision Avoidance Analysis (COLA) for rockets operating above 150 km – to preclude collisions with crewed or crewable space structures (such as the ISS or Shuttle).

== Other activities ==
The Office of Commercial Space Transportation takes on activities beyond their core regulatory responsibility for all non-governmental space launches in the United States.

For example, in June 2020, the Office of Spaceports, a subordinate section of OCST, developed a set of space launch infrastructure recommendations in a National Spaceport Network Development Plan to provide information for the development of a network of spaceports in the US that would involve commercial, state, and federal funding.

== See also ==
- Office of Space Commerce
- Commercialization of space
