= Alvin Drew =

American astronaut (born 1962)

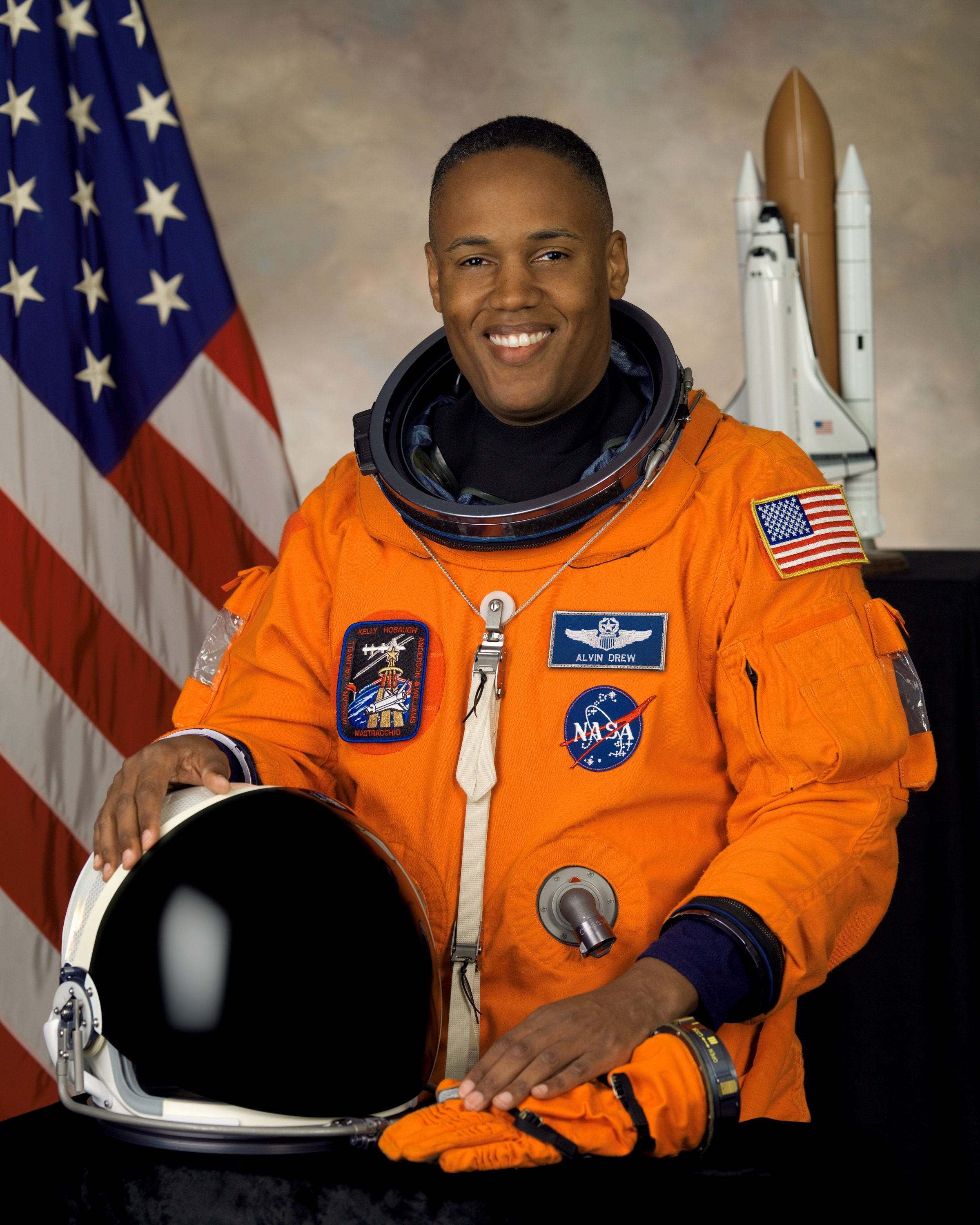
- Born: Benjamin Alvin Drew; November 5, 1962 (age 64); Washington, D.C., U.S.
- Education: United States Air Force Academy (BS); Embry-Riddle Aeronautical University (MS); Air University (MS)
- Space career

NASA astronaut
- Rank: Colonel, USAF
- Time in space: 25d 12h 59m
- Selection: NASA Group 18 (2000)
- Total EVAs: 2
- Total EVA time: 12h 48m
- Mission: STS-118; STS-133
- Mission insignia

Benjamin Alvin Drew Jr. (born November 5, 1962) is a United States Air Force officer, the director of space sustainability and acting director of Cross-Directorate Technical Integration for NASA's Space Operations Mission Directorate, and a former NASA astronaut. He has been on two spaceflights; the first was the Space Shuttle mission STS-118 to the International Space Station, in August 2007. Drew's second spaceflight took place in March 2011 on STS-133, another mission to the International Space Station. STS-133 was Space Shuttle Discovery's final mission. Drew took part in two spacewalks while docked to the station. Drew was the final African-American to fly on board a Space Shuttle, as the final two Space Shuttle missions, STS-134 and STS-135, had no African-American crew members.

Drew was selected to be an astronaut in NASA's Astronaut Group 18 in July 2000. Following his rookie spaceflight, Drew spent almost a year at the Yuri Gagarin Cosmonauts Training Center in Star City, Russia, overseeing NASA's training operations there as director of operations.

On February 28, 2011, Drew became the 200th person to walk in space, when he conducted the first spacewalk of the STS-133 mission with fellow astronaut Steve Bowen.

== Early life and education ==
Drew was born in 1962 in Washington, D.C., and spent his early years in Lanham, Maryland. He moved to Brookland, Washington, D.C., when he was four years old. Drew recalls having a desire to be a pilot from as early as four years old. In October 1968, at the age of five, Drew saw the Apollo 7 launch on television, and thereafter reputedly wished to become an astronaut.

After graduating from St. Anthony Catholic School in 1977 for his elementary education, he graduated from Gonzaga College High School in Washington, D.C. in 1980. Drew was named a National Merit Scholar and went on to earn a dual B.S. degree in physics and astronautical engineering from the United States Air Force Academy in 1984, and a M.S. degree in aerospace science from Embry-Riddle Aeronautical University. He then earned a Master's degree in political science from the Air War College of Air University. Drew is a member of the Society of Experimental Test Pilots and the American Helicopter Society. He was awarded an honorary Doctor of Science degree from Abertay University in 2011.

== Military career ==
Drew received his commission as a second lieutenant from the United States Air Force Academy in May 1984. He completed Undergraduate Helicopter Pilot Training at Fort Rucker, Alabama, in 1985. His initial assignment was to the HH-3E, flying combat rescue missions. He later transitioned to the MH-60G and was assigned to the Air Force Special Operations Command. There, he flew combat missions in operations Just Cause, Desert Shield, Desert Storm and Provide Comfort. He completed USAF Fixed-Wing Qualification in 1993, and the United States Naval Test Pilot School in June 1994. He has commanded two flight test units and served on Air Combat Command staff.

Drew is a command pilot with over 4000 hours of flying time across 30 types of aircraft. He retired from the air force in September 2010, after more than 25 years of service.

== NASA career ==
Selected as a mission specialist by NASA in July 2000, Drew reported for training in August 2000. Following the completion of two years of training and evaluation, he was assigned technical duties in the Astronaut Office Station Operations Branch. He served in technical assignments until he took a sabbatical to the U.S. Air Force's Air University at Maxwell Air Force Base, Alabama, attending a master's degree program at their Air War College.

After his first successful spaceflight, STS-118, he worked as CAPCOM officer in Mission Control for the Mission of STS-123. Drew then spent almost a year in Russia as the director of operations overseeing the US operations at Yuri Gagarin Cosmonauts Training Center in Star City. Between STS-118 and STS-133, Drew has logged more than 612 hours in space. On April 21, 2009, he delivered a lecture “Space Shuttle Flight-118: A Mission to Build the International Space Station” at the ELE public forum in Moscow.

Drew worked as a liaison between NASA and the United States Department of Defense between 2016 and 2024. Upon the establishment of the division of space sustainability in late 2024, Drew became NASA's first ever director for space sustainability. He is also the acting director of Cross-Directorate Technical Integration for NASA's Space Operations Mission Directorate.

=== STS-118 ===
When Clayton Anderson was moved to STS-117, Drew was selected for the available position on STS-118. His selection for STS-118 made him the first representative of the astronaut class of 2000 to go into space.

=== STS-133 ===
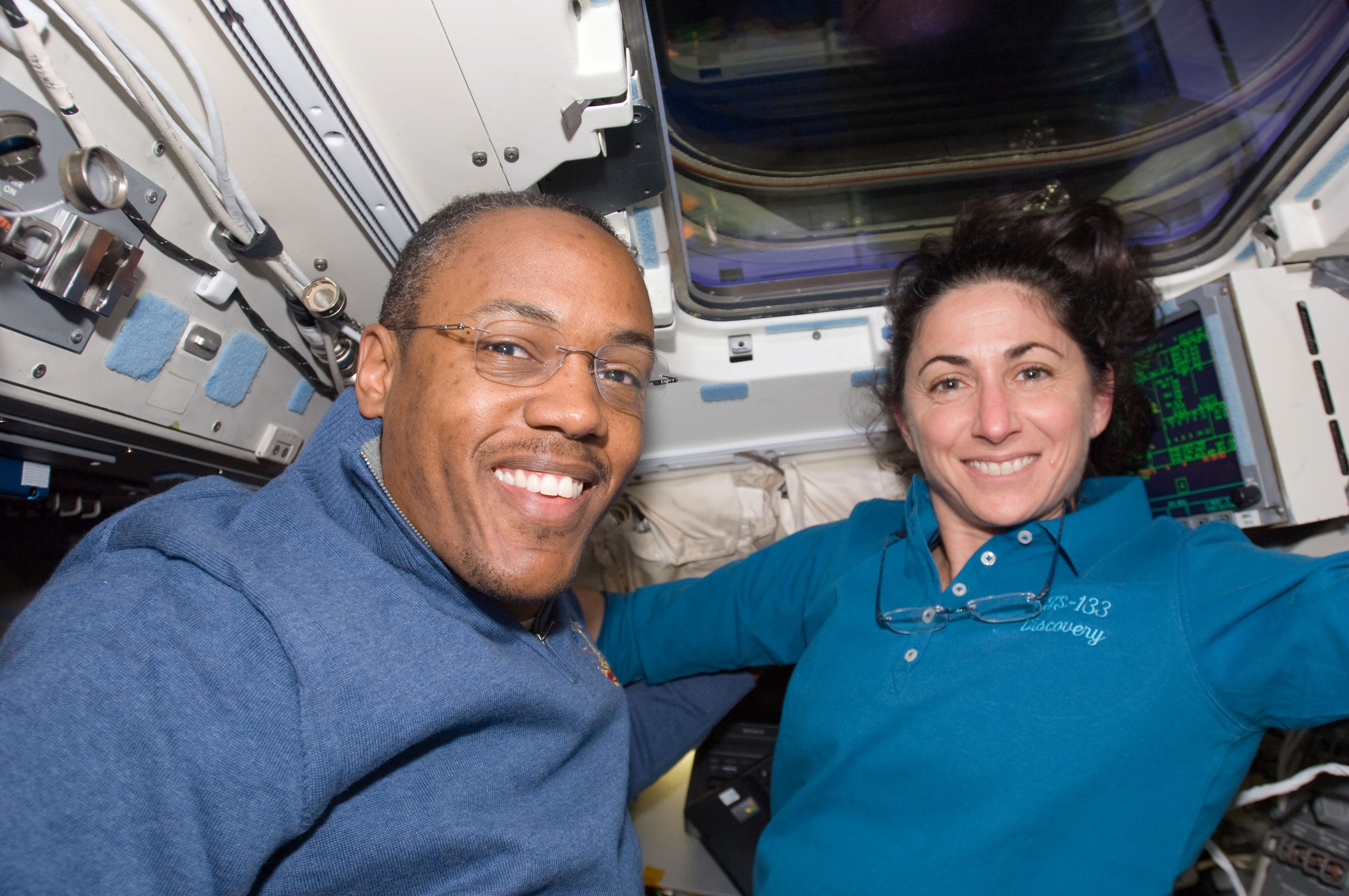
Drew and Nicole Stott during Flight Day 2 of STS-133

Drew served as a mission specialist on STS-133, the final flight of the Space Shuttle Discovery. This mission launched on February 24, 2011, and docked with the space station two days later. Landing occurred on March 9. Drew's role on this crew was that of a mission specialist, and he conducted two spacewalks. On February 28, Drew became the 200th person to walk in space.

=== White House career ===
Drew worked in the Obama Administration's Office of Science and Technology Policy from 2015 to 2016 as the assistant director for Aviation and Space Security. In 2016, he was appointed to the U.S. Air Force Academy Board of Visitors by President Barack Obama, a post he held until 2020.

== Awards and honors ==
Drew's decorations include:

- Meritorious Service Medal with 1 Oak Leaf Cluster
- Air Medal
- Aerial Achievement Medal with 5 Oak Leaf Clusters
- Air Force Commendation Medal with 2 Oak Leaf Clusters
- Air Force Achievement Medal
- Air Force Outstanding Unit Award with 3 Oak Leaf Clusters
- Combat Readiness Medal with 5 Oak Leaf Clusters
- National Defense Service Medal; Armed Forces Expeditionary Medal
- Southwest Asia Service Medal with 3 service stars.

== Patti Grace Smith Fellowship ==
In October 2020, Drew co-founded the Patti Grace Smith Fellowship, an official spin-off of the Brooke Owens Fellowship intended to provide resources for Black undergraduate students pursuing careers in aerospace.

== Personal life ==
Drew is Catholic.

== Gallery ==
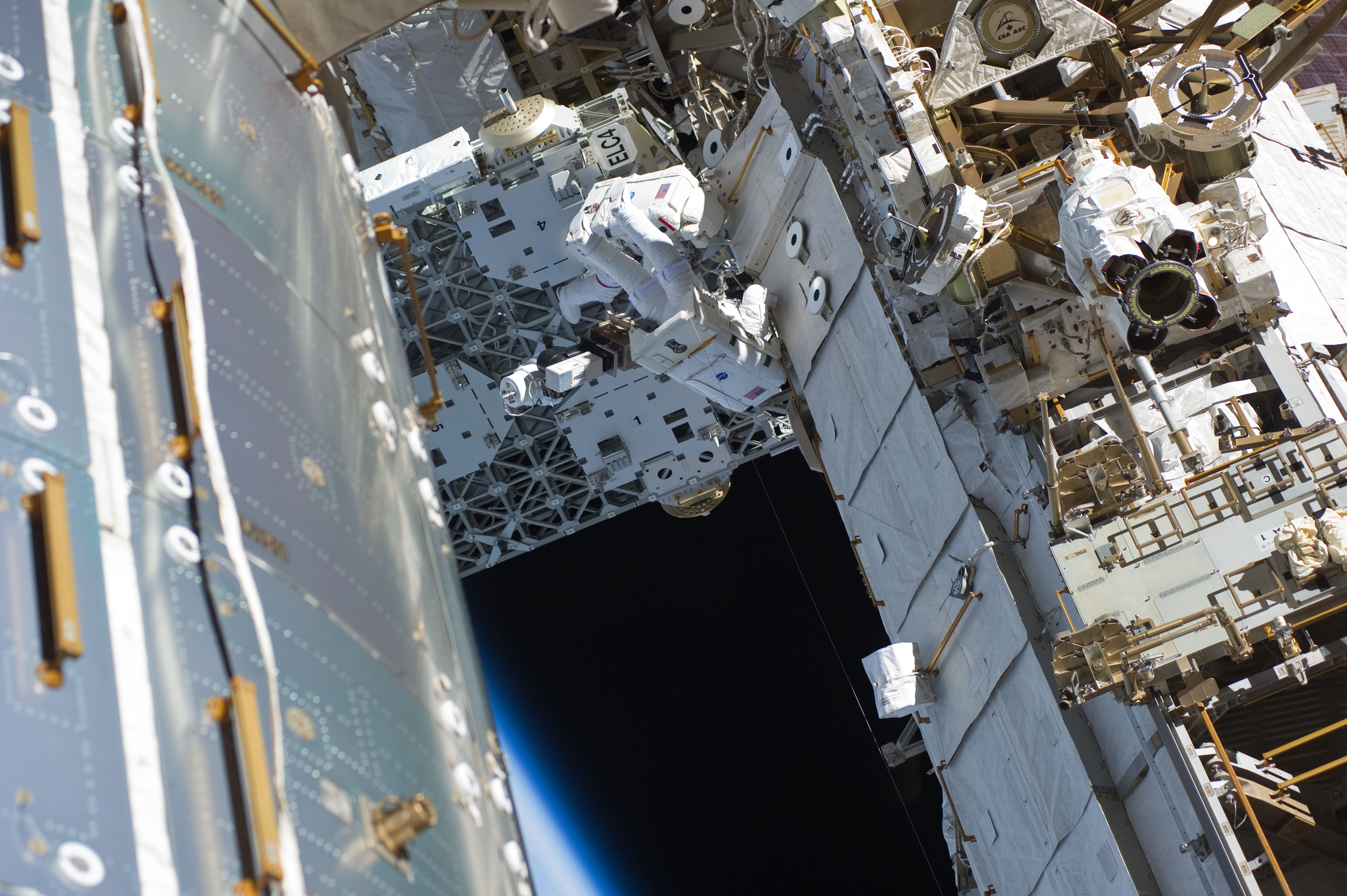
Drew during his EVA on STS-133

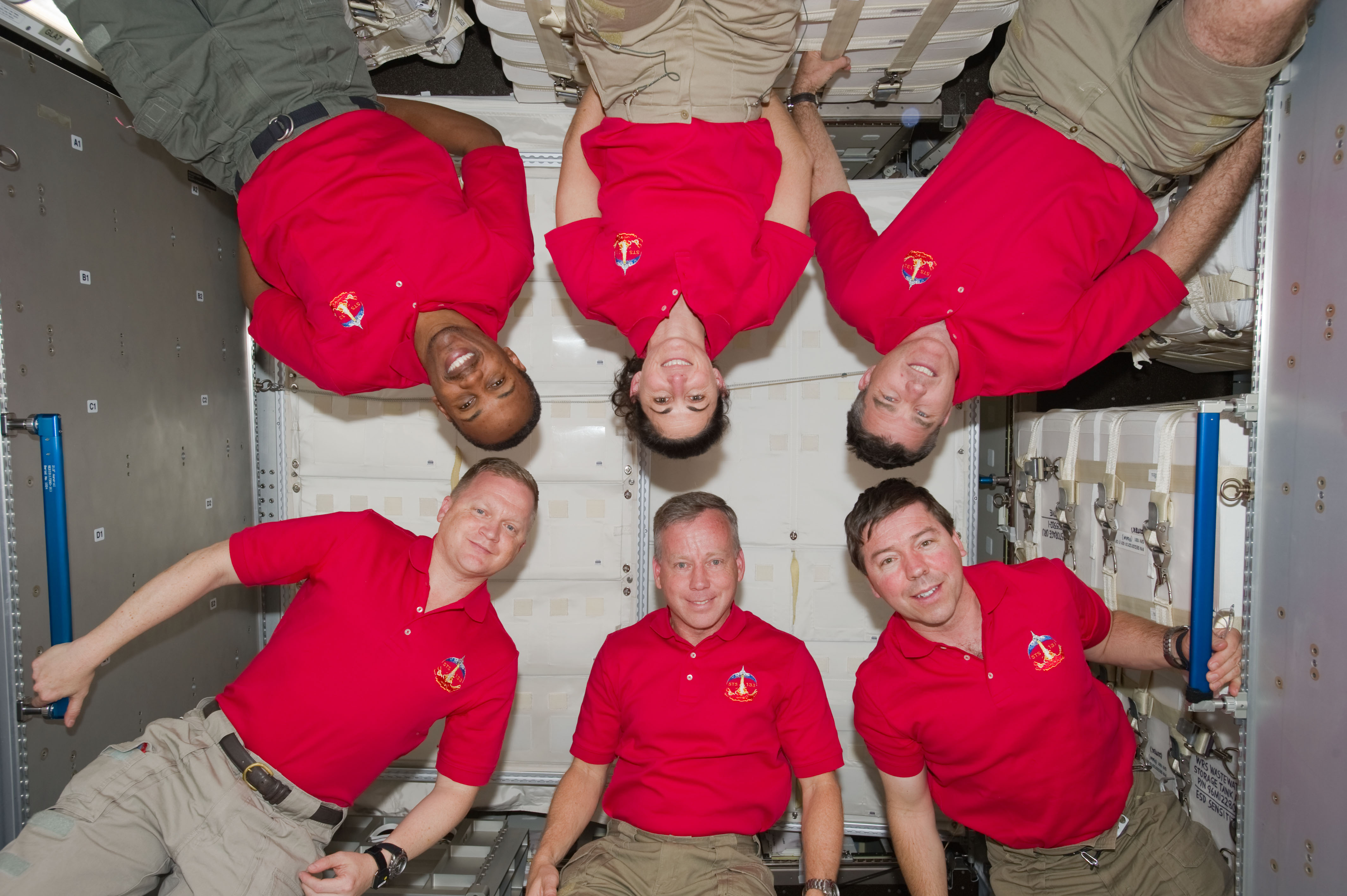
Group portrait in the Leonardo Permanent Multipurpose Module

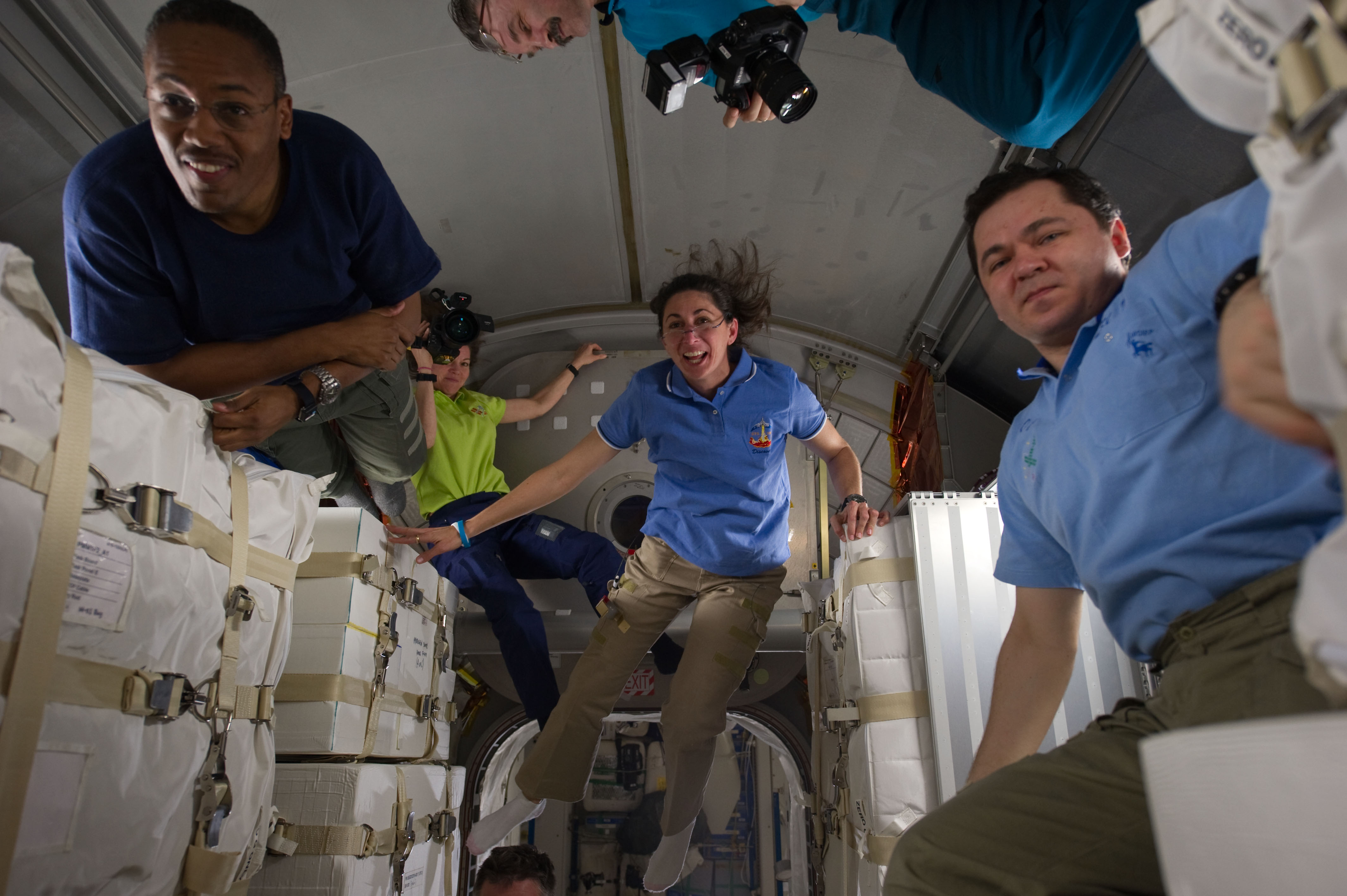
Drew floating inside the PMM

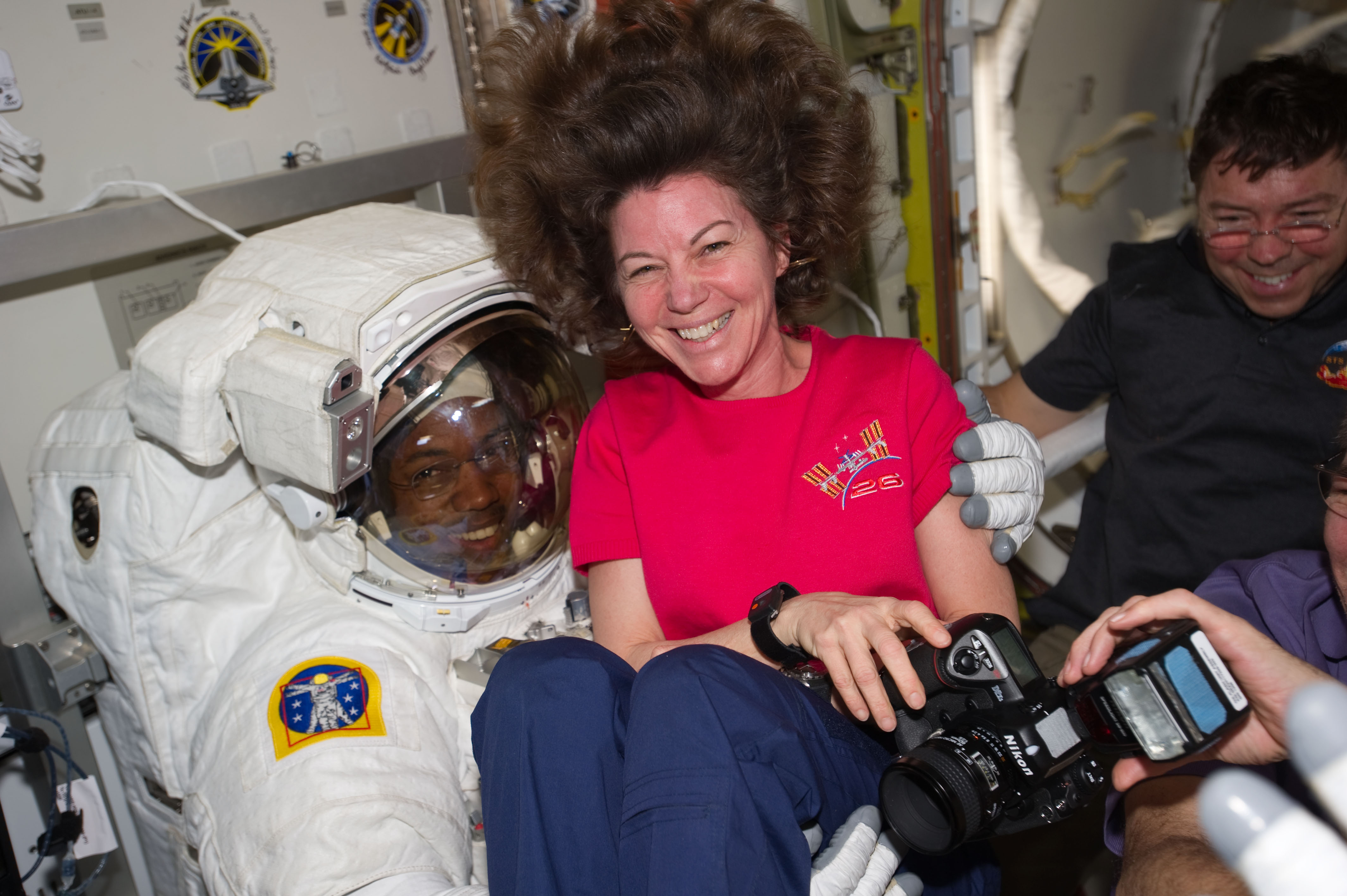
Drew inside his EVA suit

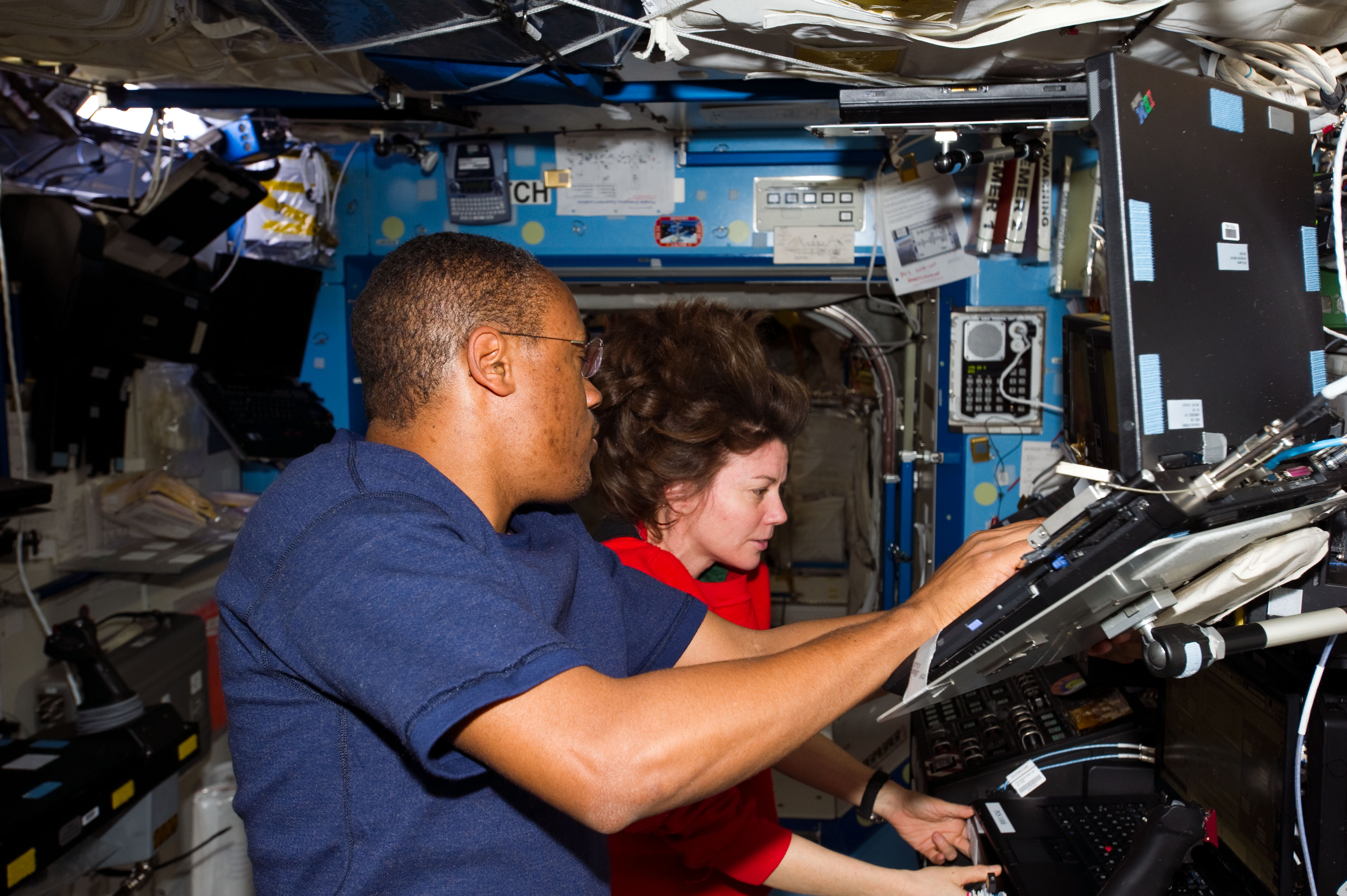
Drew working with Cady Coleman in the US laboratory module

== See also ==
- List of African-American astronauts
