= Doris Jean Austin =

American author and journalist (1949–1994)

- Born: 1949; Mobile, Alabama, US
- Died: September 1994 (aged 44–45)
- Occupations: Author and journalist

Doris Jean Austin (1949 – September 1994) was an American author and journalist.

== Early life and education ==
Doris Jean Austin was born in 1949 in Mobile, Alabama, in the United States. She was raised by her mother and grandmother. When she was six years old, Austin moved with her family to Jersey City, New Jersey, where she attended Lincoln High School. She was influenced to become a writer by her high school English teacher Reverend Ercell F. Webb. Austin was raised in a strict Baptist household, which would also serve as an inspiration for her work. She died in 1994 of liver cancer.

== Career ==
From 1989 until 1994, Austin taught workshops about fiction at Columbia University and at the Frederick Douglass Creative Arts Center. A member of the Harlem Writers Guild (originally established in 1950), she went on to co-found The New Renaissance Guild, which was inspired by writers groups during the Harlem Renaissance, others involved including Arthur Flowers, Terry McMillan, Malaika Adero, Joyce Dukes, Brenda Conner Bey and B. J. Ashanti. For a time Austin was a reporter for NBC Radio. Her work has been published in Essence, Amsterdam News, and The New York Times.

Austin wrote one novel, After the Garden (1987), which has been characterized as "one of the narratives in African American literature that dramatizes the class conflicts and disparate value systems found within the African American community." The novel draws inspiration from people who attended the Baptist church that Austin went to when young, and is about "idealism and tainted relationships". Her short story, "Heirs and Orphans," is based on a character in After the Garden, and was featured in the anthology Black Southern Voices. She had additional short stories appear in Street Lights: Illuminating Tales of the Urban Black Experience, which she co-edited.

== Legacy ==
Austin was best friends with Terry McMillan. In McMillan's 1998 novel, How Stella Got Her Groove Back, the character Delilah was based on Austin. Writer Carolyn Ferrell credits Austin as a mentor.
