= Patti Grace Smith Fellowship =

US non-profit program

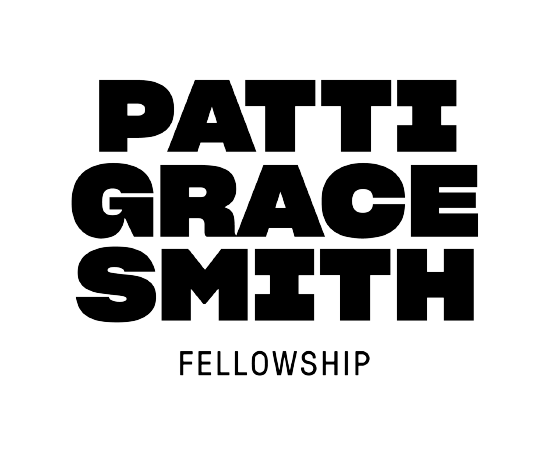
- Founded: 2020
- Founders: B. Alvin Drew, Jr. Khristian Jones; Tiffany R. Lockett; William Pomerantz
- Purpose: Aerospace Engineering
- Location: Washington, D.C.
- Region served: United States
- Website: www.pgsfellowship.org

The Patti Grace Smith Fellowship is a non-profit program in the United States that provides a paid internship, scholarship, and executive mentorship to exceptional Black undergraduate students seeking a career in aerospace. The fellowship is named after Patricia Grace Smith, a United States Federal Aviation Administration (FAA) official whose regulatory work helped lay the foundations for commercial spaceflight. The program was founded in her honor in 2020.

== Motivation and Overview ==
The Patti Grace Smith Program seeks to connect exceptional Black students with the resources to begin their careers in aerospace, with the goal of increasing the visibility, participation, and retention of Black students in order to enrich the historically homogeneous aerospace industry.

This program's mission is directly inspired by Smith, who at age 16 served as a plaintiff in Lee v. Macon County Board of Education, a case that helped desegregate public schools in Alabama. She later graduated from Tuskegee University in 1969 with a bachelor's degree in English. After her 28-year career in broadcasting, she worked for the U.S. Federal Communications Commission, working on satellite communications, then moved to the Defense Communications Agency and later the U.S. Department of Transportation where she rose to the position of Chief of Staff and then to Associate Administrator when that office was transferred to the US Federal Aviation Administration (FAA). She later chaired the Commercial Committee of the NASA Advisory Council and served as the vice chair of the National Academies' Aeronautics and Space Engineering Board. In April 2012, she was appointed by President Obama to serve on the Advisory Board of the Smithsonian’s National Air and Space Museum.

Smith fostered the growth of the nascent commercial space industry through deregulation, with the construction of the Mojave Air & Space Port and 2004 flight of SpaceShipOne occurring under her tenure. According to Elon Musk, Smith "helped lay the foundations for a new era in American spaceflight.”

The fellowship was founded by NASA Astronaut B. Alvin Drew, Virgin Galactic engineer Khristian Jones, NASA Marshall Space Flight Center lead engineer Tiffany R. Lockett, and Virgin Orbit Vice President William Pomerantz in 2020. It is closely modeled after the successful Brooke Owens Fellowship.

The program offers students their first paid summer internship at top space companies (including SpaceX, Blue Origin, Virgin Galactic, etc.), travel stipends, and mentorship from notable Black aerospace leaders, including former NASA administrators, astronauts, academics, and company executives. Fellows are also paired with peer mentors and are flown out to the annual summit in Washington, D.C. to network and meet industry leaders.

== Alumni ==
As of 2026, the Patti Grace Smith Fellowship has 200 alumni across six cohorts hailing from 40+ different universities, including Ivy League colleges, HBCUs, community colleges, and major public and private universities.

Each year, over a hundred students from around the United States apply. Cohort sizes range from year to year but approximately 20-40 students are selected through a holistic evaluation of merit, passion for aerospace, and community involvement. This is done primarily by means of interviews and essay responses, with academic achievement and volunteer activities also weighted. Finalists are matched with host companies who independently conduct interviews and award offers.
