= English Language Evenings =

Public lecture fourm

English Language Evenings (ELE) is an independent, public, English-language lecture forum established in 1998, 23 years ago, by Stephen Lapeyrouse in Moscow, Russia.

== History ==
ELE was founded in 1998 by American Stephen Lapeyrouse – author, essayist, editor, private English language tutor. In the first three seasons, 1998–2000, the forum was called “English Language Discussion Club” – ELDC. Stephen Lapeyrouse remained a permanent ELE host and moderator for 17 years. In 2015 he stepped back and devolved this position on John Harrison, editor of the magazine Moscow Expat Life, artist, radio program host of “Brave New World”. John Harrison has retired as a host of ELE II at the end of the 20th season (2017/2018). Now the hosts of ELE III are Oksana Danchevskaya, a Cultural Studies specialist and an associate professor at Moscow State Pedagogical University, and Oksana Konstantinova, a translator, an English teacher and an avid traveller to English-speaking countries.

By its 21st season (2018/2019) ELE had hosted more than 300 meetings with more than 230 different speakers from some 12 different countries: from astronauts to adventurers; from ambassadors to attaches of various embassies; visiting and resident professors; Fulbright scholars; writers and poets; well-known Moscow journalists (from e.g. The Moscow Times, The Moscow News, Russian Journal) and international TV and radio correspondents (from the BBC, VOA, Sky News, RT, et al.); social activists; heads of institutions (AmCham, Carnegie Moscow Center, Amnesty International, et al.) and just interesting individuals, on a very wide variety of lecture topics.

The list of ELE speakers includes Australian poet and artist David Wansbrough, American diplomat and scholar David Firestein, journalist and blogger John Helmer, philosopher William Lane Craig, US diplomat James Warlick, journalist and editor Lynn Berry, American scholar of public diplomacy John H. Brown, Irish ambassador Justin Harman, US diplomat Tobias Bradford, New Zealand diplomat Rowena Hume, NASA astronaut Benjamin Alvin Drew, Australian ambassador Margaret Twomey, American writer Jeff Parker, Hollywood producer Bob Van Ronkel, humanitarian aid worker Carl Wilkens, British historian Geoffrey Roberts, Aleksandr Solzhenitsyn’s son Yermolai Solzhenitsyn, American writer Deidre Dare and many others. The well-advertised forum is attended both by English-speaking Russians and the members of Moscow’s permanent and changing expat community.

== Purposes ==
The purpose of ELE is to provide intelligent, interesting evenings in Moscow in English of ideas, stories and people, in an informal, friendly atmosphere, where the speakers and the public audience are able to interact over a wide variety of topics, allowing for personal contacts and relations between the mostly expat speakers and Russians in Moscow. In the context of Moscow, ELE is a distant descendant of the Lyceum movement started in 19th century America, and a direct relative to the “Penny University” in Santa Cruz, California, founded in 1974 by American historian Page Smith, artist and art historian Mary Holmes, Dr Paul Lee, philosopher and author, and others, and is still ongoing. The host of ELE participated in the Penny University for many years.

== Organization ==
Meetings are usually held on Fridays twice a month from September to late May at the Chekhov Cultural Center (Strastnoy Boulevard, 6/2, near Pushkin Square) with lectures by (mostly) native English speakers giving lectures on topics of their own choice. Lectures usually start at 19:00, followed by questions and answers, discussion and comments, ending about 21:00.

Since the 21st season (2018/2019) ELE is absolutely free due to new library rules. For many years the attendance fee was only 200 rubles (~$3), as the host tried to limit the influence of money on ELE topics, attendance, attitudes, atmosphere. A modest honorarium was offered to speakers, though some had donated theirs to more than a dozen Russian charities over the years (e.g. Russian Orphan Opportunity Fund, Action for Russia's Children, Moscow Animals, Big Brothers, Big Sisters, Nastenka, Sofia Foundation, United Way).
