= Patti Grace Smith =

United States FAA administrator (1947–2016)

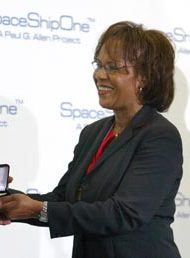
- Born: Patricia Grace Jones; November 10, 1947; Tuskegee, Alabama, U.S.
- Died: June 5, 2016 (aged 68); Washington, D.C., U.S.
- Education: Tuskegee Institute
- Spouse: John Clay Smith
- Awards: General James E. Hill Lifetime Space Achievement Award

Patricia Grace Smith (November 10, 1947 – June 5, 2016) was a United States Federal Aviation Administration (FAA) associate administrator whose regulatory work helped make personal space travel a possibility.

== Personal life ==
Patricia Grace Jones was born in Tuskegee, Alabama, on Nov. 10, 1947. Smith's father, after retiring from the Air Force, managed the canteen at the Veterans Administration Medical Center in Tuskegee. Her mother, Wilhelmina, worked as a clerk at the hospital.

As a teenager, Smith was among the first students to integrate the public schools in Macon County, Alabama, over the protests of state officials in the administration of Governor George C. Wallace. Ultimately, Smith was one of 12 students to file a lawsuit against the Macon County Board of Education to preserve their legal right to attend the previously all-white Tuskegee High School. Initially filed in 1963, the case resulted in the 1967 federal district court decision resulting in a blanket desegregation order for public primary and secondary schools, two-year postsecondary schools, and public universities. That ruling was later upheld by the Supreme Court of the United States.

Smith later attributed her negotiating skills to the experience she had during the struggle for integration.

Smith graduated from Tuskegee Institute with a bachelor's degree in English in 1969; and later undertook graduate coursework at Auburn University, George Washington University, and Harvard University.

Smith had a son with her first husband, Gene Grace, and three children with her second husband, John Clay Smith. Smith was 68 years old when she died of pancreatic cancer, on June 5, 2016, in Washington, D.C.

== Career ==
After beginning her career in private industry in the field of broadcasting, Smith spent much of her working life with the US Federal government, beginning with the Federal Communications Commission, working on satellite communications. She then went to work for the Defense Communications Agency and later the U.S. Department of Transportation. At the latter she was chief of staff of the Office of Commercial Space Transportation. That office was moved to the FAA in 1995, where she had the title of associate administrator.

In 1998, Smith was appointed to head the FAA's newly created Office of Commercial Space Transportation, a position she held until 2008. Under her administration, the FAA licensed the Mojave Air & Space Port, the first commercial spaceport in the United States. Here SpaceShipOne was launched in 2004. Smith was present to watch the launch, which was made possible through the policies developed by her office.

After retiring from government service in 2008, Smith continued to work in the aerospace industry, chairing the Commercial Committee of the NASA Advisory Council and serving as vice chair of the National Academies’ Aeronautics and Space Engineering Board, in addition to private consulting roles.

In April 2012, Smith was invited to be a member of the advisory board of the National Air and Space Museum by President Obama.

== Honors and recognition ==
After Smith's death, several aerospace organizations have created new awards or honors honoring her legacy. The Commercial Spaceflight Federation created the PGS Memorial Fund to award PGS Scholarship. The same organization also awards an annual Patti Grace Smith STEM Award to individuals or organizations that excel in the field of Science, Technology, Engineering, and Math education. Additionally, the American Astronautical Society created the Patti Grace Smith Award "in recognition of Patti’s commitment to the development of young professionals." The Patti Grace Smith Fellowship was set up in 2020 to provide "Jobs, Mentorship, and Community for Black Undergrads Seeking Aerospace Careers".

In 2021, Smith was named as the recipient of the General James E. Hill Lifetime Space Achievement Award by the Space Foundation.
