= Louise Meriwether =

American novelist (1923–2023)

- Born: Louise Jenkins; May 8, 1923; Haverstraw, New York, U.S.
- Died: October 10, 2023 (aged 100); New York City, New York, U.S.
- Education: Central Commercial High School; New York University (BA); University of California, Los Angeles (MA)
- Occupations: Novelist; biographer; journalist; activist
- Writing career
- Notable work: Daddy Was a Number Runner (1970)

Louise Meriwether (May 8, 1923 – October 10, 2023) was an American novelist, essayist, journalist and activist, as well as a writer of biographies of historically important African Americans for children. She is best known for her first novel, Daddy Was a Number Runner (1970), which draws on autobiographical elements about growing up in Harlem, New York City, during the Depression and in the era after the Harlem Renaissance.

== Early life and education ==
She was born in Haverstraw, New York, to Marion Lloyd Jenkins and Julia Jenkins. After the stock market crash of October 1929, her parents had migrated north in search of work, from South Carolina, where her father was a painter and bricklayer and her mother worked as a domestic. Meriwether grew up in Harlem during the Great Depression, the only daughter and the third of five children.

Meriwether graduated from Central Commercial High School in Manhattan and then, while working as a secretary, studied at night for a B.A. degree in English from New York University. She went on to earn an M.A. in journalism in 1965 from the University of California, Los Angeles, where she moved with her first husband, Angelo Meriwether, a Los Angeles teacher. Although this marriage, as well as her second marriage to Earle Howe, ended in divorce she continued to use the name Meriwether. She worked as a freelance reporter (1961–64) for the Los Angeles Sentinel and a black story analyst (1965–67) for Universal Studios, the first black woman hired as a story editor in Hollywood. While still living in Los Angeles, working with the Watts Writers Workshop, Meriwether was approached to be editor-in-chief of a new magazine for Black women called Essence but she declined, saying she preferred to write for them, her article "Black Man, Do You Love Me?" appearing as the cover story for the magazine's first issue in May 1970.

== Writing ==
In 1970, she published her first and most successful book, Daddy Was a Number Runner (with a foreword by James Baldwin), a novel that uses autobiographical elements about growing up in Harlem during the Depression and in the era after the Harlem Renaissance, is considered a classic. In the words of Paule Marshall: "The novel's greatest achievement lies in the sense of black life that it conveys: vitality and force behind the despair. It celebrates the positive values behind the black experience: the tenderness and love that often lie underneath the abrasive surfaces of relationships...the humor that has long been an important part of the black survival kit, and the heroism of ordinary folk...a most important novel." The novel sold more than 400,000 copies.

Becoming part of a group of young New York-based writer friends that included Rosa Guy and Maya Angelou, Meriwether later recalled: "We partied. All over. Wherever we were, we partied. ...Then, of course, we got our work done. We believed in enjoying ourselves and enjoying each other."

Meriwether began writing biographies for children about historically important African Americans — including Robert Smalls, Daniel Hale Williams, and Rosa Parks — and later explained: "After publication of my first novel ... I turned my attention to black history for the kindergarten set, recognizing that the deliberate omission of Blacks from American history has been damaging to the children of both races. It reinforces in one a feeling of inferiority and in the other a myth of superiority."

Meriwether would later publish the novels Francie's Harlem (1988), Fragments of the Ark (1994), and Shadow Dancing (2000).

Her short stories have appeared in The Antioch Review and Negro Digest, as well as in anthologies including Black-Eyed Susans: Classic Stories by and About Black Women (ed. Mary Helen Washington, 1975), Confirmation: An Anthology of African American Women (eds Amina Baraka & Amiri Baraka, 1983), The Other Woman (ed. Toni Cade Bambara, 1984) and Daughters of Africa (ed. Margaret Busby, 1992). She wrote the Introduction to The Givens Collection edition of Incidents in the Life of a Slave Girl by Harriet Jacobs.

Meriwether also taught creative writing at Sarah Lawrence College and at the University of Houston. She was awarded grants from the National Endowment for the Arts, the Mellon Foundation, the New York State Council on the Arts and the Rabinowitz Foundation.

== Activism ==
Meriwether had over the years been involved with various organized black causes, including the founding, with John Henrik Clarke, of the anti-Apartheid group Black Concern (originally the Committee of Concerned Blacks), the Harlem Writers Guild, and (with Vantile Whitfield) the Black Anti-Defamation Association (BADA; also known as Association to End Defamation of Black People) that was formed to prevent Twentieth Century Fox's producer David L. Wolper from making a film of William Styron's controversial 1967 novel The Confessions of Nat Turner, which misinterpreted African-American history. She was active in the peace movement for most of her life. In her own words, when she was a named as a recipient of the Clara Lemlich Award for Social Activism in 2011:

I am a writer, and also a dedicated activist and peacenik. In New York City in my twenties I was chapter chairman of my union, marching in May Day Parades and having rotten eggs thrown at my head. In Los Angeles I was arrested in a sit-in against the racist Birch Society and sentenced to five years probation. In Bogalusa, Louisiana, I worked with the Congress of Racial Equality (CORE); back in New York I was instrumental in keeping Muhammad Ali, then world's heavyweight champion, from fighting in South Africa and breaking a cultural boycott. In Washington, D.C., I was arrested in 2002 in a protest against the disastrous policies of the World Bank and the IMF. Back in New York I was active in several forums breaking the silence about the rampant rape in the Congo and the multinational corporations and countries involved. Last year I helped set up a forum at Riverside Church on the Abolition of Nuclear Weapons."

Meriwether was an executive board member of the Organization of Women Writers of Africa (OWWA), an NGO co-founded in 1991 by Jayne Cortez and Ama Ata Aidoo "for the purpose of establishing links between professional African women writers".

== Death ==
Louise Meriwether died at a nursing home in the New York borough of Manhattan, on October 10, 2023, at the age of 100. According to filmmaker Cheryl Hill, who had cared for her in recent years, Meriwether's health declined after she contracted COVID-19 in 2020.

== Bibliography ==
- Daddy Was a Number Runner (Prentice Hall, 1970; The Feminist Press at CUNY, 2002, ISBN 978-1558614420)
- The Freedom Ship of Robert Smalls (Prentice Hall, 1971, ISBN 978-0133310825)
- The Heart Man: Dr. Daniel Hale Williams (illus. Floyd Sowell; Prentice-Hall, 1972, ISBN 978-0133852295)
- Don't Ride the Bus on Monday: The Rosa Parks Story (illus. David Scott Brown; Prentice Hall, 1973, ISBN 978-0132187503)
- Francie's Harlem (Amsterdam: Furie Literair, 1988)
- Fragments of the Ark (Atria, 1994, ISBN 978-0671799472)
- Shadow Dancing (One World/Ballantine, 2000, ISBN 978-0345425959)

== Honors and accolades ==
- 2001 "Lifetime Achievement Award" from Black Writers Alliance (formerly the African American Online Writers Guild) Gold Pen Awards.
- May 8, 2016, Meriwether's 93rd birthday, was declared Louise Meriwether Appreciation Day by the borough president of Manhattan, Gale Brewer.
- On June 1, 2016, the Louise Meriwether First Book Prize was announced to celebrate Meriwether's achievements and continue her legacy. Launched by the Feminist Press in partnership with TAYO Literary Magazine, in accordance with both organizations' missions to amplify silenced voices, the contest is "seeking the best debut books by women and nonbinary writers of color."
- August 2016: Lifetime Achievement — American Book Awards (Before Columbus Foundation).
- 2018: Center for Black Literature lifetime achievement award presented at the 14th National Black Writers Conference, in recognition of her commitment to a lifetime of literary activism.
- 2023 PEN Oakland/Reginald Lockett Lifetime Achievement Award
