= John H. Brown (scholar) =

American academic

John Halit Brown (born 1948) is a senior fellow at USC Center on Public Diplomacy where he regularly publishes the Public Diplomacy Press Review.

The son of Dr. John Lackey Brown (1914–2002), a poet and cultural attaché who served in Belgium, Mexico and Paris, Brown is currently a research associate at the Institute for the Study of Diplomacy at Georgetown University, where he has taught courses about public diplomacy.

A consultant for the Library of Congress's "Open World" exchange program with the Russian Federation, he has written for the Washington Post, The Nation, TomPaine.com, Moscow Times, and American Diplomacy and occasionally lectured at the ELE public forum in Moscow.

Brown, who received a Ph.D. in Russian History from Princeton University in 1977, was a member of the U.S. Foreign Service from 1981 until March 10, 2003, when he resigned over the war in Iraq. He served in London, Prague, Kraków, Kiev, Belgrade, and Moscow. He is co-author (with S. Grant) of The Russian Empire and the Soviet Union: A Guide to Archival and Manuscript Materials in the United States. His other published writings include research on Russian history as well as articles in the Polish and Serbian press.
