= Daddy Was a Number Runner =

1970 novel by Louise Meriwether

- First edition
- Author: Louise Meriwether
- Language: English
- Published: 1970
- Publisher: Prentice Hall
- Publication place: United States
- Followed by: The Freedom Ship of Robert Smalls

Daddy Was a Number Runner is the first novel by American writer Louise Meriwether. It was published by Prentice Hall, with a foreword by James Baldwin, in 1970, and is now considered a modern classic. It depicts a poor black family in Harlem during the Great Depression in the first half of the 20th century, as seen through the eyes of a 12-year-old African-American girl who has one brother who wants to be a chemist and another who is a gang member.

== Reception ==
Paule Marshall said of the book:

[Its] greatest achievement lies in the sense of black life that it conveys: vitality and force behind the despair. It celebrates the positive values behind the black experience: the tenderness and love that often lie underneath the abrasive surfaces of relationships … the humor that has long been an important part of the black survival kit, and the heroism of ordinary folk … a most important novel.

It was an Essence Book Club Choice in December 2002.
