= Brenda Wilkinson =

American writer

Brenda Scott Wilkinson (born 1946) is an American writer of books for children and young adults. She is known for her Ludell trilogy of young adult novels, the first of which was a finalist for the 1976 National Book Award for Young People's Literature.

== Early life and education ==
Brenda Scott Wilkinson was born in 1946 in Moultrie, Georgia. She was the second of eight children born to Malcolm and Ethel Scott. Her family then moved across the state to Waycross, where she graduated high school in 1963. Then, as part of the Great Migration, Wilkinson moved to New York, where she worked for a bank and took night classes at Hunter College. She married a military man and had two daughters, Kim and Lori, and spent a brief stint in Alaska when her husband was stationed there.

== Career ==
As Wilkinson's marriage began to fall apart, she was inspired by the Black Arts Movement and began attending writing workshops, studying with the poet Sonia Sanchez. When Sanchez gave Wilkinson an opportunity to read her poetry at an event that, unbeknownst to her, had editors from Harper & Row Publishers in the audience, it launched Wilkinson's career as a writer. She signed a contract with the publisher to write literature for children and young adults.

She is best known for her Ludell trilogy of young adult novels, which includes Ludell (1975), Ludell and Willie (1976), and Ludell’s New York Time (1980). These books tell the story of Ludell Wilson, a 12-year-old girl who aspires to be a writer, as she grows up in still-segregated Waycross, Georgia. In the sequels, Ludell loses the grandmother who raised her and is forced to leave small-town Georgia—and her boyfriend, Willie—to join her mother in New York.

In 1976, the first book in the series was a finalist for the National Book Award for Young People's Literature. Ludell and Willie was named a New York Times Book Review Outstanding Children's Book of the Year for 1976 and an ALA Best Book for Young Adults in 1977. An excerpt from Ludell and Willie was included in the 1992 anthology Black Southern Voices.

Much of Wilkinson's writing, including the Ludell series, is inspired by her own childhood under segregation—not fiction but "faction," in her words. Her other books include the 1987 novel Separate, But Not Equal, which deals with six Black teenagers' struggle to integrate a Georgia high school, and 1993's Definitely Cool, about a girl dealing with social pressure in the projects.

Wilkinson worked for many years as a staff writer for the United Methodist Church's Board of Global Ministries, for whom she wrote Under the Baobab Tree: Children of Africa (2000). She is also the author of several works of nonfiction about notable African American figures and the civil rights movement, including Jesse Jackson: Still Fighting for the Dream (1990), The Civil Rights Movement (1997), and African American Women Writers (2000). She has been involved in such organizations as PEN International and the Harlem Writers Guild.

In 2003, she retired from the United Methodist Church, and she moved back to Georgia a few years later. In 2014, Ludell was reprinted by Lizzie Skurnick Books.
