= Arthur Flowers =

American writer

- Born: 1950 (age 75–76); Memphis, Tennessee, U.S.
- Occupations: Author, Professor (emeritus)

Arthur R. Flowers, Jr. (born 1950) is an American novelist, memoirist, and performance poet. His work is known for its focus on the African-American experience, particularly folklore, blues music, and hoodoo spiritualism.

A native of Memphis, Tennessee, Flowers fought in the Vietnam War before launching his literary career in New York City, where he was an executive director of the Harlem Writers Guild. He has been a member of the faculty of Syracuse University since 1996.

Flowers lives in Syracuse, New York.

== Biography ==
=== Early life ===
Flowers is the son of Arthur R. Flowers, Sr., a medical doctor and bridge player of national rank, and Eloise Flowers, a nurse and teacher. He was born in Memphis, Tennessee, where he was immersed in the American civil rights movement from an early age. In high school, he developed a reputation for intelligence, earning the nickname "Mr. Brain", and for radicalness, earning the nickname "Bullet" because of the bullet he wore on a necklace. In 1968, he attended Martin Luther King Jr.'s final speech, and then led his high-school class in a walkout after King's assassination. According to Flowers, "we charged the police and got into all kinds of riots".

Flowers joined the U.S. Army and was deployed to Vietnam as part of the American war effort there. In Vietnam, his confrontations with officers led to his court-martial on three separate occasions. He has described his participation in the war as helping to change his perception of history.

=== Career ===
After returning from Vietnam, Flowers moved to New York City. He enrolled in writing workshops with John Oliver Killens, an influential figure in the Black Arts Movement, whom Flowers came to regard as his mentor. Flowers joined the Harlem Writers Guild, an association for African-American writers that Killens co-founded. Through his membership, Flowers came to know other notable writers of the period, including Terry McMillan. Flowers eventually served as executive director of the Harlem Writers Guild. Later, Flowers was a founding member, along with Doris Jean Austin and others, of the New Renaissance Writers Guild, a nonprofit organization based in New York City. He served as its executive director.

In 1986, Flowers's first novel was published. Entitled De Mojo Blues, it follows three African-American soldiers who, after being dishonorably discharged from their service in the Vietnam War, attempt to adjust to civilian life in the United States. Noting that the novel was "at times exquisitely written", Publishers Weekly declared it "a sincere and creative first novel by a very promising writer". Writing in Essence, Paula Giddings called it a "compelling look into the emotional world" of its characters. Around the time of the publication, Flowers struggled with drug addiction and homelessness. He has claimed that encountering a religious pamphlet in the late 1980s helped him to reorient his life.

In 1993, Flowers's second novel, Another Good Loving Blues, appeared. It details the romance between a hoodoo practitioner and a blues musician as they travel from Arkansas to Tennessee during the period known as the Great Migration. Publishers Weekly proclaimed it "a spirited effort" told in a "sonorous voice". Writing in The New York Times, Fran Handman called it a "charming, provocative novel" that contained "flashes of painful insight".

In 1996, Flowers joined the faculty of Syracuse University, teaching in the Department of English's Creative Writing Program. Since joining the faculty, he has produced a memoir, Mojo Rising (2001), a work on hoodoo spiritualism, The Hoodoo Book of Flowers (2019), and three works for young readers. In addition, he has published excerpts from a third novel in progress.

== Work ==
=== Style ===
External videos
- In this video from 2011, Arthur Flowers performs the poem "Jungle Song." (3 mins)

Flowers's writing is characterized by blues-inspired lyricism and the incorporation of dialects and African-American Vernacular English. His work tends to open with a self-referential invocation, highlighting his interest in both oral storytelling tradition and hoodoo spiritualism. These invocations, by identifying Flowers himself as the narrator of his stories, also point to his interest in metafictional techniques. Flowers has termed his approach to his work "literary hoodoo".

As a performance artist, Flowers has developed what he has called a "blues-based act that has evolved into griotic performance" that relies on traditional African storytelling techniques.

=== Themes ===
Scholars have focused on Flowers's novels and their thematic concern with language, cultural tradition, and social responsibility.

The scholar Keith Gilyard has argued that Flowers, in De Mojo Blues, demonstrates that "the value of language skill" is of prime importance to the development of African-American culture, extending a theme that has run through much of African American fiction. Linguistic skill is employed toward preserving and advancing the African American community—one of Flowers's major thematic concerns—with advancement reliant upon preservation of history and traditions, as the scholar Patricia Schroeder has argued. Schroeder points to Another Good Loving Blues as an example of Flowers's interest in connections to history and community, both through his conception of his characters and through the novel's structure, which she compares to a traditional call-and-response song. Similarly, the scholar Kameelah Martin has examined Flowers's aim, in Another Good Loving Blues, to connect and revitalize two important strands of African-American cultural tradition: hoodoo and the blues.

Flowers's concern with tradition and community underscores his overarching concern with social responsibility, a concern that aims, according to Gilyard, to "forge a modern myth out of African American culture" and to transform stories, traditions, and locations important to African-American communities into what Deborah Smith Pollard has called "African-American holyground". By investing these traditions and places with spiritual importance, Flowers's work stresses the need for their preservation and cultivation through social and political participation.

=== Influences ===
Flowers has credited the influence of John Oliver Killens on his work. He has also spoken about the influence on his work of African oral storytelling traditions. Scholars and critics have pointed to the influence on his work of Zora Neale Hurston and Ishmael Reed, among others.

== Selected bibliography ==
=== Novels ===
- De Mojo Blues: De Quest of HighJohn de Conqueror. E.P. Dutton, 1986. ISBN 9780525243762
- Another Good Loving Blues. Viking, 1993. ISBN 9780670848218

=== Memoir ===
- Mojo Rising: Confessions of a 21st Century Conjureman. Wanganegresse Press, 2001. ISBN 978-0971581609

=== Nonfiction ===
- The Hoodoo Book of Flowers: The Great Black Book of Generations. Rootwork Press, 2019. ISBN 978-1734101911

=== For young readers ===
- Cleveland Lee's Beale Street Band. Troll Communications, 1997. ISBN 978-0816736522
- I See the Promised Land: A Life of Martin Luther King, Jr. Tara Books, 2010. ISBN 978-1554983285
- Brer Rabbit Retold. Tara Books, 2017. ISBN 978-9383145461

== Honors ==
Flowers has received the following honors for his work:

- New York Foundation for the Arts Fellowship in Fiction (1985)
- National Endowment for the Arts Fellowship (1991)
- New York Foundation for the Arts Fellowship in Nonfiction (1999)
- New York Foundation for the Arts Fellowship in Fiction (2008)
- Keeping the Blues Alive Award of The Blues Foundation (2008)

Flowers's work has been anthologized in Breaking Ice: An Anthology of Contemporary African-American Fiction and Gumbo: An Anthology of African American Writing, among other anthologies. He has been a visiting professor or speaker at numerous institutions. Additionally, he has been an invited speaker at literary festivals, including the Jaipur Literature Festival in India, the Indian Summer Festival in Canada, and the Memphis Literary Arts Festival.

=== Cultural impact ===
Flowers was a consultant for Spike Lee's 2020 film about Vietnam War veterans, Da 5 Bloods. He was hired after Lee encountered Flowers's first novel, De Mojo Blues.
