= Norman Thomas High School =

Public school in New York City

Location
- 111 East 33rd Street; New York, (New York County), NY 10016; United States
- Coordinates: 40°44′47.39″N 73°58′50.62″W

Information
- School type: Government funding, High school
- Status: Closed
- Closed: 2014
- NCES District ID: 3600077
- NCES School ID: 360007702039
- Principal: Philip Martin, Jr.
- Faculty: 114.19 (on an FTE basis)
- Grades: 9 to 12
- Enrollment: 2,147 (2009-2010 school year)
  - Grade 9: 871
  - Grade 10: 619
  - Grade 11: 302
  - Grade 12: 131
  - Ungraded: 224
- Student to teacher ratio: 18.80
- Campus type: Urban
- Colors: Maroon and Black
- Mascot: Tigers

The Norman Thomas High School for Business and Commercial Education was a public high school (closed in June 2014) in the Murray Hill neighborhood of Manhattan, New York City under the New York City Department of Education. Formerly known as Central Commercial High School (CCHS), and before that, the Central School of Business and Arts, its former location was on 42nd Street in a structure constructed with a 20-story office building in the air rights above it. It was renamed after Presbyterian minister and Socialist activist Norman Thomas and moved to occupy the first nine floors of 3 Park Avenue, a 42-story skyscraper on East 33rd Street at Park Avenue in 1975.

The high school was originally designed to train students for secretarial and commercial occupations such as accounting, bookkeeping, merchandising and salesmanship, clerical skills, stenography and typing. As of 1940, every senior at Central Commercial High School was required to complete four weeks of work in an office during the last semester. In later years, this expanded to include such topics as data processing and physical distribution.

== Notable alumni ==
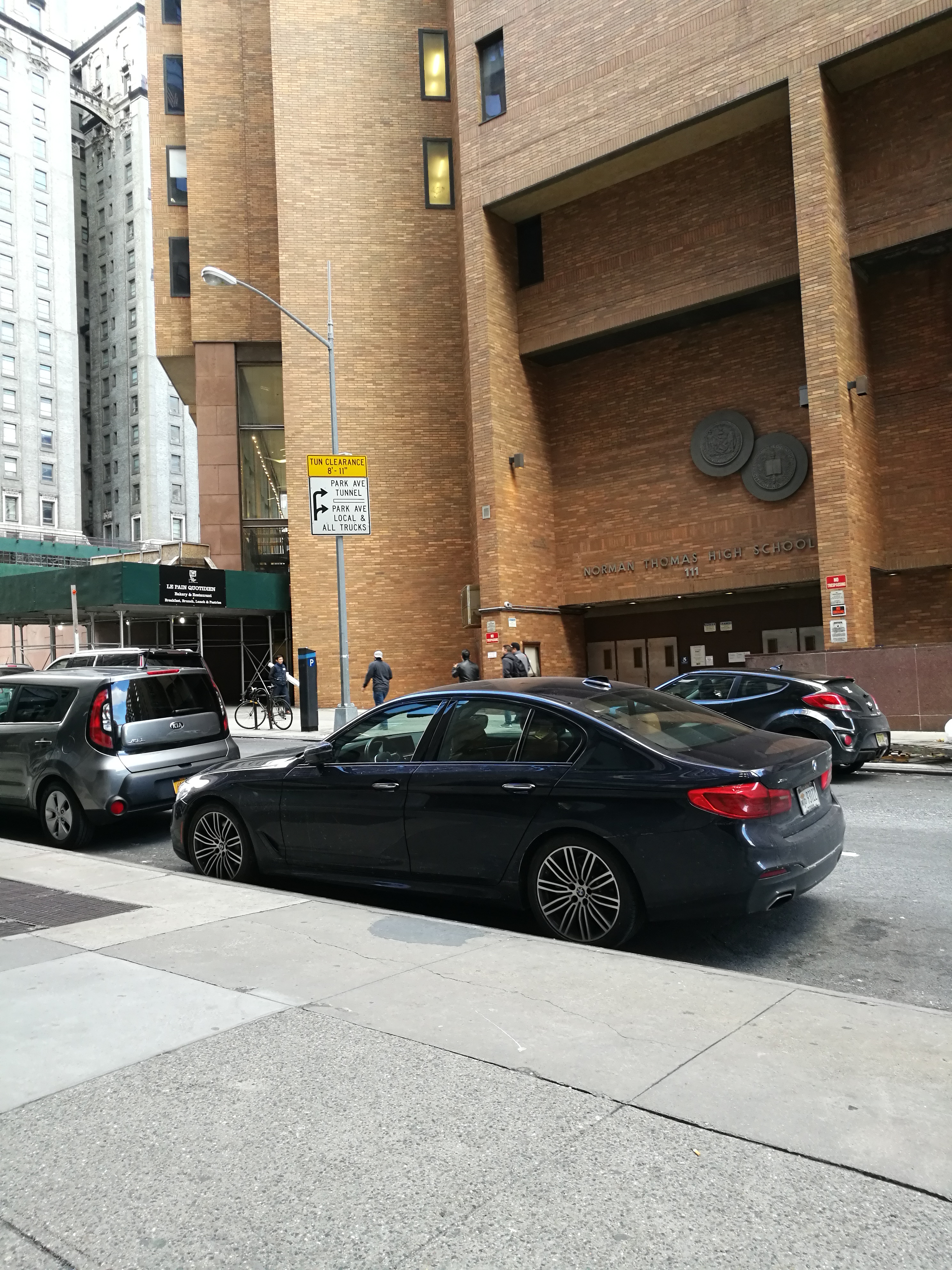
Front entrance

- Barbara Alston, (1943–2018), a lead singer for the girl group the Crystals attended briefly before transferring to William H. Maxwell Vocational School.
- Kool Moe Dee, (b 1962) American rapper, writer and actor, considered one of the forerunners of the new jack swing sound in hip hop
- Luis Flores, (b 1981) Dominican professional basketball player and is top scorer in the Israel Basketball Premier League
- Aurelia Greene, (1934–2021) represented District 77 in the New York State Assembly,
- Special K, (b 1963) American old-school hip hop emcee from the Bronx.
- John Kerwin, talk show host
- Armelia McQueen, (1952–2020) American actress best known for her roles in the Broadway musical Ain't Misbehavin' and the film Ghost (1990)
- Louise Meriwether, (b 1923) American novelist, essayist, journalist and activist
- Tito Puente, (1923–2000) Latin jazz and salsa musician and composer
- Khadimou Rassoul Cheikh Fall, (b 1998) better known as Sheck Wes, American rapper, singer, songwriter, model, and professional basketball player for Paris Basketball.
