= Grace F. Edwards =

American author (1933–2020)

Grace Fredrica Edwards (January 3, 1933 – February 25, 2020) was an American author who served as a director of the Harlem Writers Guild.

In February 2020, she died at the age of 87.

== Biography ==
Born as Grace Fredrica Smith on January 3, 1933, in Harlem Hospital, New York, to William Smith, a laborer for the depression-era Works Progress Administration, and Fredrica Smith, a homemaker, Grace was educated at the City College of New York.

She served as a professor of creative writing at the College of New Rochelle, Hofstra University, Hunter College, and Marymount Manhattan College.

She was also a contributor to The Los Angeles Times Book Review and The Washington Post Book Review.

== Awards ==
In 1999, she received the Fiction Honor Book award from the Black Caucus of the American Library Association.

== Bibliography ==
- In the Shadow of the Peacock (1988)
- If I Should Die (1997)
- No Time to Die (1998)
- A Toast Before Dying (1998)
- Do or Die (2000)
- The Viaduct (2004)
