= Harlem Writers Guild =

Organization of African-American writers

- Founded: 1950; 76 years ago
- Founders: John Oliver Killens, Rosa Guy, John Henrik Clarke, Willard Moore and Walter Christmas
- Location: New York City, United States
- Website: theharlemwritersguild.org
- Formerly called: Harlem Writers Club

Harlem Writers Guild (HWG) is the oldest organization of African-American writers, originally established as the Harlem Writers Club in 1950 by John Oliver Killens, Rosa Guy, John Henrik Clarke, Willard Moore and Walter Christmas. The Harlem Writers Guild seeks to give African-American writers a platform to present their art in its entirety without censoring their experience of being Black in the United States of America. In addition to publishing works, the Harlem Writers Guild also acts as an organization to promote social change and an entity that hosts events to celebrate and promote their members.

== History ==
The Harlem Writers Guild (formerly known as the Harlem Writers Club) was set up in 1950 as a forum where African-American writers could develop their craft. After funding for an organization active in the late 1940s called "The Committee for the Negro in the Arts" ended, these writers felt excluded from the mainstream literary culture of New York City. The HWG was also part of the Black Arts Movement of the 1960s, and its rationale continues to be to develop and aid in the publication of works by writers of the African diaspora. Other writers who have been associated with the HWG include Lonne Elder III, Douglas Turner Ward, Ossie Davis, Paule Marshall, Audre Lorde, Maya Angelou and Sarah E. Wright.

In the 1950s, John Oliver Killens had invited several aspiring African-American writers to meet at a shop in Harlem to hear and review one another's literature. The Harlem Writers Guild thus began expanding, with new authors writing and publishing work emphasizing topics such as racism, oppression, and welfare. The Harlem Writers Guild was a tool that was used by African-American authors of its presence to uniquely divide their literary work against mainstream literature that neglected African-American literature.

Emphasizing on expanding their literary works as well as creating a space for advantageous advertisement of their work, the Harlem Writers Guild used their social circles and their academic voices towards social change. During the 1960s, the group supported Malcolm X, conflicts of independent rights in Angola and Mozambique and organized to dismantle racist policies established in South Africa. The group used their connections to communicate about marches, Freedom Rides, and other progressive organizations.

In 1977, the HWG was honored by the United Nations Society of Writers. In 1986, John O. Killens estimated that members of the Harlem Writers Guild had produced more than 300 published works of fiction, non-fiction, poetry, plays, and screenplays. Several have received literary acclaim.

=== Harlem Writers Guild Press ===
In 2000, the HWG announced a partnership with the digital publisher iUniverse to create its own imprint, Harlem Writers Guild Press. The anthology Beloved Harlem: A Literary Tribute to Black America's Most Famous Neighborhood (Random House, 2005), edited by William H. Banks Jr., former executive director of HWG, featured work by HWG members including Dr. John Henrik Clarke, Grace F. Edwards, Rosa Guy, Rachel DeAragon, John Oliver Killens, Walter Dean Myers, Louise Meriwether, Funmi Osoba, Diane Richards, Karen Robinson, Dr. Olubansile Abbas Mimiko and Sarah E. Wright.

=== Harlem Renaissance ===
During the 1920s and 1930s, many southern African Americans traveled to Northern urban cities for greater opportunities. The Harlem Renaissance cultivated a boom of literary, music, art expressions as a channel for writers, musicians, and artists cumulatively in Harlem, New York. This boom was so prevalent it was regarded as the rebirth of African-American arts. The prevalence in the Harlem neighborhoods began as a root within the African diaspora, somewhere many African Americans traveled to and combined feelings of culture and community. The growing prevalence of African-American art forms paved the way for a new era of African-American literature to enroll.

== Members ==
Past and present members include:

- Judy C. Andrews
- Maya Angelou
- Doris Jean Austin
- William H. Banks Jr.
- Rosemary Bray
- Andrea Broadwater
- Wesley Brown
- Irving Burgie
- Godfrey Cambridge
- Alice Childress
- Dr. John Henrik Clarke
- Minnette Coleman
- Ossie Davis
- Ruby Dee
- Rachel DeAragon
- James DeJongh
- Bob Desverney
- Dr. Beryl Dorsett
- Sheila Doyle
- Grace F. Edwards
- Lonne Elder III
- Donis Ford
- Bill William Forde
- Rosa Guy
- Loyle Hairston
- Lorraine Hansberry
- Robert Hooks
- Betty Ann Jackson
- Rose James
- John Oliver Killens
- Audre Lorde
- Walter Dean Myers
- Louise Meriwether
- Paule Marshall
- Julian Mayfield
- Terry McMillan
- Robert McNatt
- Dr. Olubansile Abbas Mimiko
- Lofton Mitchell
- Alfonso Nicks
- Wilbert Oliver
- Funmi Osoba
- Sidney Poitier
- Diane Richards
- Karen Robinson
- Charles Russell
- Gammy Singer
- Wilbert Tatum
- K. C. Washington
- Valerie Wilson Wesley
- Sandra L. West
- Brenda Wilkinson
- Sarah E. Wright

Among writers more recently added to the HWG roster are:

- Angela Dews
- Miriam Kelly Ferguson
- Cordenia Paige
- Eartha Watts Hicks
- Sylvia White

=== John Henrik Clarke ===
John Henrik Clarke is just one of the influential co-founders who helped develop the Harlem Writers Guild as a space specifically for African-American literary creatives to preserve their experiences. He was an autodidact, never fully completing his education, rather learning from his mentor Arturo Alfonso Schomburg. Clarke had a strong emphasis on understanding the African-American experience through the use of cultural relativism and not through the Eurocentric distortion seen in history books. His emphasis contributed to the idea that African-American lives have worth and value, thus further preserving the black experience.

=== John Oliver Killens ===
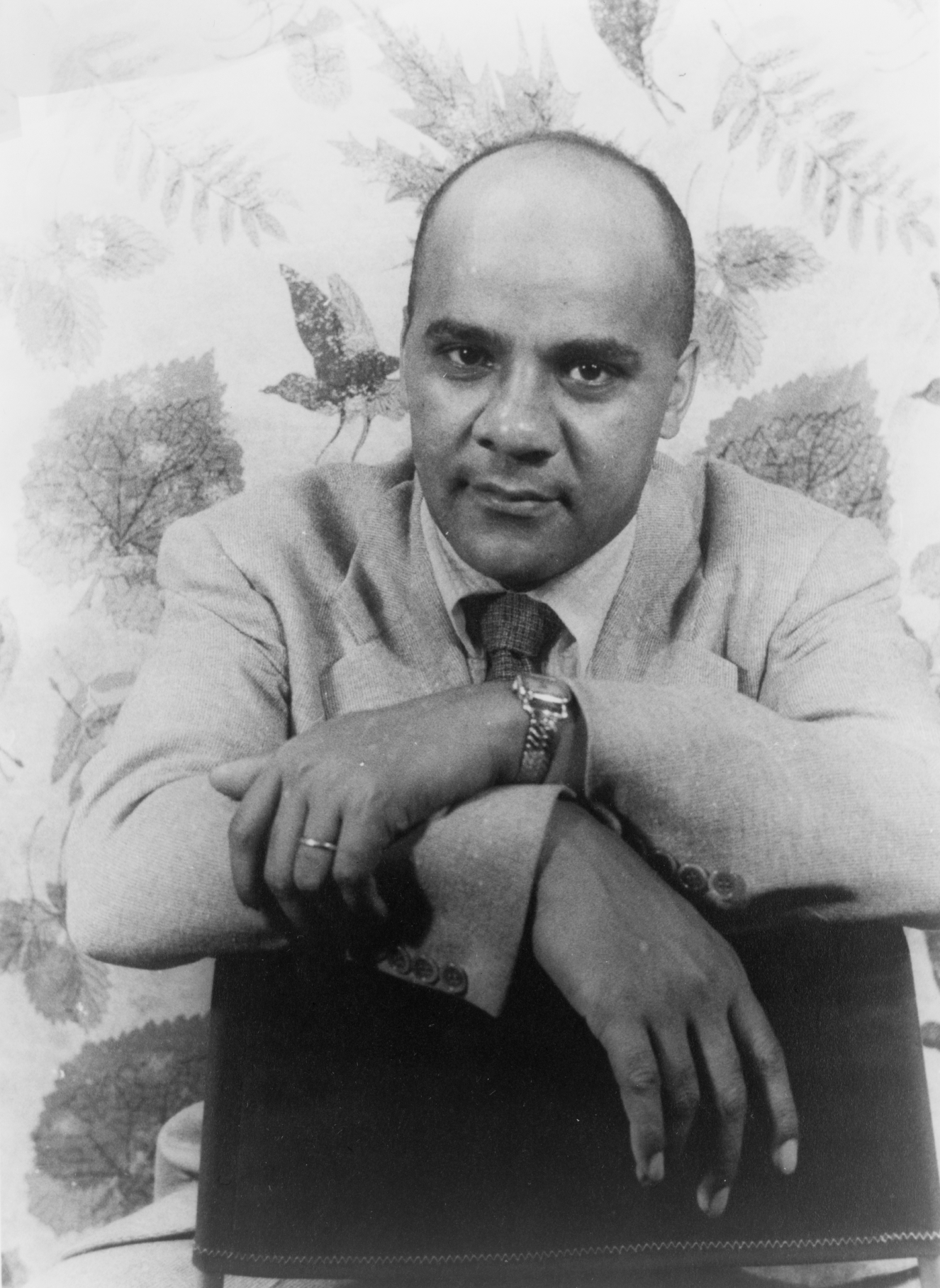
Portrait of John Oliver Killens

John Oliver Killens was the first guild member to have their work published. Killens is known for his politically charged stories, which aim to invoke social change. He is most notable for his debut novel Youngblood, which was first published in 1954. This novel in particular is considered a landmark protest novel of the American Civil Rights Movement and revolves around the lives of an African-American family living in Georgia under Jim Crow laws.

== Events ==
On March 12, 1972, the Harlem Writers Guild hosted a party in celebration of Chester Himes' autobiography The Quality of Hurt (1971) at the Carnegie Endowment for International Peace in New York, when those appearing on the program with Himes included Ossie Davis, Ruby Dee, and John A. Williams.

In March 2021, the spirits brand Rémy Martin teamed up with the Harlem Writers Guild to honor artists from Harlem in the "Voices of Harlem" campaign. This partnership was able to give younger generations the tools and confidence to appreciate and engage in their African-American literary legacies.

== Social movements ==
Members of the Harlem Writers Guild and the Black nationalist literary organization, On Guard for Freedom, are credited for the demonstration of protest in front of the United Nations following the assassination of the Congolese Prime Minister Patrice Lumumba in 1961, with Rosa Guy, Maya Angelou and Paule Marshall being prominent among the activists who stormed the building to stage a sit-in.
