= Bob Van Ronkel =

American film producer

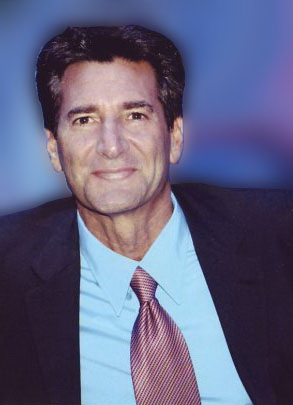
Bob Van Ronkel (press photo)

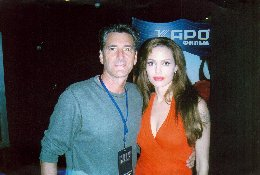
Bob Van Ronkel with Angelina Jolie

Bob Van Ronkel is an American producer and the president of Doors to Hollywood, a company that in the last 24 years has taken or sent over 150 well-known Hollywood actors, directors, speakers, bands, models, and athletes to Russia, Ukraine, Kazakhstan, Uzbekistan, Mongolia, Turkey, Saudi Arabia, Dubai and other neighboring countries to meet presidents, oligarchs and other VIP's, to attend film festivals, forums, special event, and perform concerts. He has also produced 9 films, and two television series, as well as numerous events.

== Early life ==
Van Ronkel was born in Orange, California, and graduated from Beverly Hills High School. His mother, Joy Wurgaft, was one of the original "Little Rascals".

== Career ==
After selling real estate in Los Angeles for many years and then opening a restaurant in Beverly Hills, in 1998 Van Ronkel was introduced to a Russian producer in Los Angeles, who asked him if he could help distribute his Russian-produced, English-language film in the USA. A few months later and after helping to successfully sell the film internationally, he received an invitation from the Mayor of Moscow, Yury Luzhkov, to build multiplex cinemas throughout Russia and organized a meeting between the Russian government and Warner Bros studio.

Following his 1998 trip to Moscow with executives from Warner Bros, Van Ronkel received a call from Renat Davletyarov, Nikita Mikhalkov's General Director, who asked him if he could bring an actor to the Moscow International Film Festival. During that time, he convinced Martin Landau to come with him to the Festival in Moscow, and in 1999 Van Ronkel became a consultant between Hollywood and Moscow. In 2000, he brought Sherry Lansing, who back then was a president of Paramount Pictures, and Billy Friedkin to Russia. In 2001, he convinced actors such as Jack Nicholson, Sean Penn, Lara Flynn Boyle, Woody Harrelson and Peta Wilson, to visit the Moscow International Film Festival and the same month Jim Carrey also flew to Russia to meet with the Russian oligarch Oleg Deripaska, after contacting Van Ronkel.

After the festivals came the time when he was bringing actors to Russia for movie making. Such an example was when he brought John Malkovich and Dolph Lundgren to a Russian producing company that had opened its office in Los Angeles. For Van Ronkel's 30th birthday, the Russians threw a $7 million week-long party at Jamaican Grand Lido Bracco Resort and after inviting over 150 guests, among which were such groups as Kiss, Nazareth, The Scorpions, and Sugar Ray, attended the carnival in Brazil. His 34th birthday, which was only a three-day event and cost only 3 million dollars, Van Ronkel spent in Cannes.

In 2002, he finally made up his mind to settle in Russia permanently. Six months after he settled, Van Ronkel opened his own company, under the title "Doors to Hollywood", which aimed to bring more actors to Russia. Following the opening of his company, he brought Steven Tyler and Katy Perry to Russia.

During his 15-year tenure living in Moscow, he booked talent for over 300 different events and produced the Odessa Jazz Festival for three consecutive years. In 2003, for the 300th Anniversary of Saint Petersburg, he helped organize artist Hiro Yamagata/MDM Bank's laser exhibition which lit up the Neva River and was attended by 1.3 million people.

In December 2010, he arranged a visit for Kevin Costner and his band Modern West to play during a private charity event in Saint Petersburg. At the concert, Putin, who at that time was Prime Minister, played piano on the stage and sang Fats Domino's "Blueberry Hill", while Kevin Costner himself and other celebrities such as Kurt Russell, Goldie Hawn, Monica Bellucci and Sharon Stone clapped to the tune.

In 2013, Bob Van Ronkel assisted NBC/Universal with their Miss Universe Pageant in Moscow and sat a few seats away from Donald Trump.

In 2016, Van Ronkel was hired to bring Steven Seagal to meet with President of Russia Vladimir Putin, the two of which soon became best friends.

He brought many guests over to Russia and CIS states: Hilary Swank, Pamela Anderson, Mariah Carey, Katy Perry, Val Kilmer, Kanye West, Bryan Ferry, Jon Voight, Billy Zane, Jean-Claude Van Damme, Alice Cooper, Mickey Rourke, Antonio Banderas, Nicolas Cage, Flo Rida, Milla Jovovich, Sigourney Weaver, Irina Shayk, A-HA, 30 Seconds to Mars, Back Street Boys, Tom Jones, Paul Anka, Owen Wilson, John Cusack and many more.

He was vice-president of Kinotavr.

He has produced eight films, four of which were filmed in Russia, three Russian television series, one for ORT called Tryukachi, and another for Russia Channel 2 called Delo Betagami. and three 1,000,000 Smiles charity events for orphan children. Bob has been a consultant to more than 12 film festivals, including the Moscow International Film Festival, Faces of Love Film Festival, Tashkent International Film Festival, 2Morrow FF, Astana Action Film Festival, Eurasia International Film Festival, Odesa International Film Festival, Stars of Shaken Film Festival, Me and Family FF and The October FF, as well as Russian channels MTV, Muz-TV, NTV and the 1st Channel and the Tashkent University. In 2007 he opened the Grand Havana Room Moscow, a private cigar and business club for Russia's elite and in 2014, opened the Doors to Hollywood Acting Academy in Moscow.

BVR is currently working to bring many more actors and bands to the UAE, GCC, Russia, Kazakhstan, Uzbekistan and other countries. He is developing new films and television series, such as From the Files of the KGB, Oligarch Wives, and Hollywood's Man in Moscow. In 2017 Bob moved from Moscow to Las Vegas, has continued to book talent all over the world and started Irina Nero Music Productions.

== Productions ==
- 2022 - Executive Producer, "Sticker", aka 'The Yellow Note".
- 2017 - Executive Producer, Show Girls TV Series for NTV, 12 Episodes
- 2017 - Executive Producer, Bachelor Party
- 2016 - Producer, Irina Nero Music Video I Love
- 2014 - Executive Producer, Delo Betagami TV Series Russia 2, 8 Episodes
- 2011 – Associate Producer, In the Name of the King 2
- 2011 - Executive Producer Everything Included (Not Credited)
- 2009 – Co-Produced, Command Performance
- 2006 – Produced, The Odessa Jazz Festival
- 2005 – Produced, The Odessa Jazz Festival
- 2004 – Produced, A Day at the Jazz Festival
- 2004 – Produced, Odessa Jazz Festival
- 2004 – Executive Produced, Mirror Wars (Zerkalnie voyni: Otrazhenie pervoye)
- 2003 – Co-Produced, Tryukachi, a television series about stuntmen for Russia's ORT
- 2003 – Produced, Hiro Yamagata's Outdoor Laser Exhibition in Saint Petersburg
- 2001 – Executive Produced, Red Serpent
- 2000 – Executive Produced, Scream of the Mummy
- 1999 – Executive Produced, The Tic Code
- – Best feature film; Berlin International Film Festival
- – Audience Award and Special Recognition for Music; Hampton's Int. Film Festival
