= Stephen Lapeyrouse =

Stephen Ludger Lapeyrouse (born December 10, 1952) is an American author, essayist, journalist and the founder of English Language Evenings community-forum in Moscow, Russia.

== Biography ==
Stephen Lapeyrouse was born in Fort Knox, Kentucky; grew up in Mobile, Alabama. Graduated University Military School in 1971; graduated New College, University of Alabama in 1977 with a BA in Interdisciplinary Studies: Religion and Philosophy; he received an MA in 1981 with Antioch College’s Individualized Master of Arts Degree Program (resided in Germany and Switzerland), completed his Master’s Thesis, “In Quest of Incarnation”, in the San Francisco Bay Area.

In 1988-89 Lapeyrouse delivered a series of public lectures titled "Chrysopylae Lectures – The Call of Spiritual Nobility", in Santa Cruz, Palo Alto, Berkeley, and Mt Shasta, California.

After annual travels to Russia starting in 1986 he wrote a book Towards the Spiritual Convergence of America and Russia: American Mind and Russian Soul, American Individuality and Russian Community, and the Potent Alchemy of National Characteristics (published in Santa Cruz, 1990).

Lapeyrouse moved to Moscow in July 1994.

In 1994 he won the prize (shared with Tatyana Morozova) of the literary magazine Moskva for the first article in the series “Russian-American Dialogue”; participated in a round-table discussion on Russia with Aleksandr Solzhenitsyn at the Moskva office on Arbat Street in 1998.

Since 1995 Lapeyrouse worked as a writer, editor and consultant for the educational magazine English of Publishing House “First of September”. With some TV appearances over the years, during 2013 he was a special correspondent for eighteen programs of “Brainstorm” on TV Tsentr; and has been a free-lance contributor to various periodicals since 1994.

In 1998 he founded an independent, public English-language lecture forum English Language Evenings (ELE) to which he remained host and moderator until 2015. ELE has had more than 250 meetings with more than 200 different speakers from some 12 different countries since it began.

In summer 2013 Lapeyrouse read passages from HenryThoreau's Walden at the inauguration ceremony of the Thoreau Cabin in the Russian village of Medvedevo during the annual meeting of the Ugory Project.

In 2013 Stephen Lapeyrouse became one of the nominees for The Moscow News special prize “Import of Goodwill” honoring expats who perform community service for public benefit in Russia.

== Bibliography ==
- Towards the Spiritual Convergence of America and Russia: American Mind and Russian Soul, American Individuality and Russian Community, and the Potent Alchemy of National Characteristics, 1990. – ISBN 0-9628048-0-0
- В поисках «Американской мечты» – Избранные эссе, M.: Буки Веди, 2015. – ISBN 978-5-4465-0687-3

Periodical publications (selection from 80+ articles 1995–2007)

- The Search for the “American Dream” (5 parts; English, October – November 1995)
- Notes on the Lost Cosmos of American Culture (17 parts; English, November 1995 – August 1996)
- Worried Questions to Russian Teenagers, from an American Scholar (English, No. 5, February 1997)
- Contrasting Ideas of Man – The “American Creed” vs. the “Perennial Philosophy” (Американский характер. Традиция в культуре: Очерки культуры США / отв. ред. О.Э. Туганова. – М.: Наука, 1998. – С. 68–98.)
- Zarathustra’s Answer to Leo Tolstoy’s Despair (English, No. 22, June 1999)
- “Gazing on the face of death...” – The Memento Mori of “September 11, 2001” (English, No. 34, September 2002)
