= DaMaris B. Hill =

Women poet and educator

- Born: Charleston, West Virginia
- Occupations: Writer, Scholar, Educator

Academic background
- Education: Morgan State University (BA) Morgan State University (MA) University of Kansas (PhD)

DaMaris B. Hill is an American writer, scholar, and educator. She is the author of Breath Better Spent: Living Black Girlhood, A Bound Woman Is a Dangerous Thing, The Fluid Boundaries of Suffrage and Jim Crow: Staking Claims in the American Heartland, \Vi-zə-bəl\ \Teks-chərs\ (Visible Textures), and other books. Her digital work includes “Shut Up In My Bones”, a twenty-first-century poem. Hill is a professor of Creative Writing, English, and African American Studies at the University of Kentucky. She is a member of The Wintergreen Women Writers Collective.

== Early life and education ==
Hill was born in Charleston, West Virginia, to Damaris J. Lowe and Winton M. Hill III. Both of her parents are clergy in the African Methodist Episcopal Church. Much of Hill's creative work references her upbringing and family. Many of her books attend to public and familial histories.

In 1999, she earned her Bachelor of Arts in English from Morgan State University. In 2005, she earned her Master of Arts in English from the same institution. In 2011, she earned a graduate certificate in Women, Gender, and Sexuality Studies from the University of Kansas. In 2012, she earned her Ph.D. in English (creative writing) from the same institution.

Hill has also earned several professional certificates. She earned a certificate in Holocaust Educators Network from City University of New York and Lehman College. She earned a certificate in Research Administration 101 through KU Research and Graduates Studies at the University of Kansas. She earned a certificate in Teacher Consultant Certification through the National Writing Project at Towson University.

== Career ==
Hill has worked for several higher education institutions as a faculty member and/or administrator, including Sojourner-Douglass College, Goucher College, the Lied Center of Kansas, the University of Kansas, The Project on the History of Black Writing, Southern Illinois University Edwardsville, the University of Kentucky, and others. She has held scholar-in-residence appointments and fellowships at Harvard University and Brown University.

Hill began working in education and instruction as early as 1997 supervising reading instruction for pre-school and early elementary programs. She was a reading and English literature teacher and trainer with the Baltimore City Public School System. In 2004, she joined the second group of teachers for Digital Harbor High School and became a teaching consultant with the National Writing Project.

In 2008, she moved to become a professional writer. While at the University of Kansas, she served as a teaching assistant for the Department of English, a special collection coordinator for the Project on the History of Black Writing, and the inaugural program assistant for the Institute for Digital Research in the Humanities. In 2012, she served as a research fellow for the Department of English.

In Spring 2013, she was a visiting assistant professor for Southern Illinois University Edwardsville’s English Department. In Fall 2013, she came to the University of Kentucky as an assistant professor of Creative Writing, English Literature, and African American Studies. Since then, she has served in multiple roles at the institution. In 2015, she was a scholar-in-residence for Race and Teaching at the Center for the Enhancement of Learning and Teaching (CELT). In 2018, she served again as a scholar-in-residence for CELT and had a parallel appointment as a faculty fellow for the Center for Graduate and Professional Diversity Initiatives. In 2019, she was promoted to associate professor. In 2020, she co-founded and was interim director of the Commonwealth Institute for Black Studies while also serving as the interim director of the African American and Africana Studies Department. In 2022, she was promoted to full professor.

She has also served as affiliated faculty for the Department of Writing, Rhetoric and Digital Media; the Center on Equality and Social Justice; the Department of Gender and Women's Studies; the Committee on Social Theory; the American Studies Program; and African American and Africana Studies.

In Fall 2022, Hill was a visiting fellow in Race and Ethnicity for the Center for the Study of Race and Ethnicity in America at Brown University. During the 2023 to 2024 academic year, Hill is serving as a fellow and scholar-in-residence for Harvard University’s Hutchins Center for African and African American Research.

Hill has also lent her service to national and international organizations, such as The Watering Hole Poetry, MacDowell, Tidal Basin Review, Lyric Theater and Cultural Arts Center, the National Council of Negro Women, Barnes-Findley Foundation, and the African American Heritage Festival in Baltimore.

== Research interests ==
Hill’s major fields of interest are Black feminism and examinations of intersectional identities, digital cultures, theories associated with remix, historical archives, and public narratives. Influences to her writing include Saidiya Hartman, Toni Morrison, and Deborah Willis. Their theories of critical fabulation, rememory, and envisioning the Black body largely impact Hill's work.

== Awards and recognition ==
- First American poet signed by Bloomsbury Publishing
- 2023 Rona Jaffe Foundation Fellow at The Castle w/ Civitella Ranieri Foundation
- 2022 Visiting Faculty Fellowship Center for the Study of Race and Ethnicity in America
- 2020-2021 Igniting Research Collaborations Grant Funding from the Office for the Vice President of Research at the University of Kentucky “Stimulating Higher Education Leadership Progression - an Institutional Framework for BIPOCs” ($30,950 research grant)
- 2018 Girls of Color: Voice and Vision Grant Award with Kentucky Foundation for Women
- 2018 Arts Envoy to eSwatini/Swaziland with the Bureau of Educational and Cultural Affairs Exchange Programs, United States Department of State
- 2016 Furious Flower Poetry Center at James Madison University, Inaugural Poet-In-Residence
- 2016 The MacDowell Colony, Fellow
- 2015, 2017 Kentucky Foundation for Women, Artist Enrichment Grant Awardee
- 2015 Bread Loaf Writers' Conference for Poetry in Erice, Sicily
- 2014 Bread Loaf Writers' Conference for Poetry in Middlebury, Vermont
- 2013 The Paden Institute, Center for Black Literature at Medgar Evers College, City University of New York and State University of New York at Plattsburg
- 2012-2015 The Watering Hole Poetry Fellowship
- 2003 Creative Writing Award for Short Fiction - Zora Neale Hurston/Richard Wright Foundation
- 2003 Short Fiction Award Finalist for College Writers - College Language Association

== Bibliography ==
=== Books ===
- Breath Better Spent: Living Black Girlhood. Bloomsbury Publishing, January 2022. ISBN 9781635576474
- A Bound Woman Is a Dangerous Thing: The Incarceration of African American Women from Harriet Tubman to Sandra Bland. Bloomsbury Publishing, January 2019 (several reprints). ISBN 9781635572612

=== Edited books ===
- The Fluid Boundaries of Suffrage and Jim Crow: Staking Claims in the American Heartland. Lexington Books, June 2016. ISBN 9780739197875
- Hill, DaMaris B. and Nicole LaMonaca. National Writing Project 2008. Professional Writing Retreat Anthology. National Writing Project, 2009.

=== Chapbooks ===
- \ Vi-zə-bəl \ \ Teks-chərs \ (Visible Textures). Mammoth Publications, April 2015.

=== Plays ===
- Farrell III, Herman D. and Hill, DaMaris. Black Lives Matter: 1619 to Now. Directed by Jeremy Gillett, performance by The Department of Theater and Dance at The University of Kentucky, 24–27 February 2022, Guignol Theater at The University of Kentucky, Lexington, KY.

=== Book chapters ===
- “Time Period: Aug. 20, 1634-Aug. 19, 1639. Theme – Tobacco.” Four Hundred Souls: A Community History of African America, 1619-2019, edited by Keish N. Blain and Ibram X. Kendi. Penguin Random House, 2021. ISBN 9780593134047
- “Nationalism, Print Capitalism and the Perversity of Propaganda: Imagining Zora Neale Hurston Coming of Age.” Neglected American Women Writers of the Long Nineteenth Century, edited by Verena Laschinger and Sirpa Salenius. Routledge, 2019. ISBN 9780367193492
- “Concrete.” Introduction to Women’s, Gender and Sexuality Studies, edited by L. Ayu Saraswati, Barbara Shaw, and Heather Rellihan. Oxford University Press, February 2017. ISBN 9780190266066
- “Introduction,” “Editor’s Note: Claims of Memory and Space,” and “Conclusion.” The Fluid Boundaries of Suffrage and Jim Crow: Staking Claims in the American Heartland. Lexington Books, 2016. ISBN 9780739197875

=== Poems ===
- “A Reckoning: Assata in 1980” and “Miz Lucille.” Furious Flower: Seeding the Future of African American Poetry. Northwestern University Press, Jan. 2020. ISBN 9780810141544
- “This Granny is Gangster” and “Truth Is a Mirror in the Hands of God.” 400 Years: the Story of Black People in Poems Written from Love, edited by Lita Hooper and Michael Simanga. Broadside-Lotus Press in partnership with Third World Press and University of Detroit-Mercy Press, Fall 2019.
- “Shut Up In My Bones” and “Ruby McCollum.” New Poetry by DaMaris Hill: From Her Collection A Bound Woman Is a Dangerous Thing. Literary Hub, Jan. 2019.
- “Shut Up In My Bones: a digital poem/a remix.” Mammoth Publications, 17 Aug. 2017.
- “Revolution.” Five Poets on the New Feminism. ESPN, 24 Apr. 2017.
  - Controversy: ESPN later removed Hill's poem after receiving backlash for the poem's dedication to Assata Shakur.
- “A Haiku for Gwendolyn Brooks.” Revise the Psalm: Work Inspired by the Writings of Gwendolyn Brooks, edited by Quraysh Ali Lansana and Sandra Jackson-Opoku. Curbside Splendor Publishing, 2017. ISBN 9781940430867
- “Grace (for Bela’ Dona).” The Funk Issue, edited by Anthony Bolden, special issue of American Studies Journal, 2013.
- “Continuous Fire: A Love Poem for Sonia Sanchez.” The Pierian Literary Journal, Spring 2013.
- “Lust and Gaines,” “The Love Song of Alice Clifton,” and “Palms.” Meridians: Feminism, Race, Transnationalism, 2013.
- “119.” To the Stars Through Difficulties: A Kansas Renga in 150 Voices, edited by Caryn Marriam-Goldberg. Mammoth Publications, 2012. ISBN 9780983799597
- “Stewing.” Poem of the Week – Blog This Rock. Split This Rock Poetry Festival, 10 Aug. 2012.
- “Dreaming in Shadows,” “Webs of Water,” and “Beatle.” Special Women’s Issue, edited by Mary Stone-Dockery. The Medulla Review, Mar. 2012.
- "The Dream: Windows." Blue Island Review Anthology, edited by Mary Stone Dockery and Gabriela Lemons, Nov. 2011.
- “Faith and Burden of Blinking.” Kweli Journal, edited by Laura Pegram, 31 Dec. 2010.
- “Laura Dreams of Escape,” “Bewitched,” and “A Mermaid’s Stroll.” Reverie: Midwest African American Literature, edited by Randall Horton, Patricia Biela, and Qiana Towns, 15 Sep. 2010.
- “The Concession of Annie Cutler.” The Black Bottom: An African American Blog of Politics, Culture, and Social Activism, edited by Randal Maurice Jelks, 9 Sep. 2010.
- “Little Black Ballerina in Mississippi Clay.” Mourning Katrina: A Poetic Response to Tragedy, edited by Joanne V. Gabbin. Mariner Companies, Inc, 2009. ISBN 9780980007787
- “On My Back.” Bermuda Anthology of Poetry, edited by Mervyn Morris, Department of Community & Cultural Affairs, 2006.
- “What Hides in the Leaves,” “Adam and Lilith's Haiku: Problems in Paradise,” and “Lilith Blesses Leah.” Women in Judaism: Contemporary Writings, 2003.

=== Fiction ===
- “Auntie Assata.” The Offing, edited by Mahogany L. Browne, 10 May 2017.
- “Gargoyle Boy” (novel excerpt). Prison Industrial Complex and Capital Punishment, edited by Melanie Henderson, a special issue of Tidal Basin Review, Spring 2012.
- “On the Other Side of Heaven – 1957.” Reverie: Midwest African American Literature, edited by Randall Horton, Feb. 2011.
- “Six-Word-Stories." Tongues of the Ocean: Words and Writing from the Islands, edited by Nicollette Bethel and Sonia Farmer, Feb. 2011.
- “Lingers.” Sleet Magazine (irregulars), edited by Susan Solomon, Spring 2011.

=== Creative non-fiction ===
- “Formed>In.” Early American Literature, vol. 54, no. 2. The University of North Carolina Press, 2019.
- “Only Boys Have Fans.” ESPN, 7 Feb. 2016.
- “Waking Barbie” (a memoir except). Sou’Wester: Women Writers Rock!, edited by Valerie Vogrin and Allison Funk, special issue of Sou’wester Literary Journal, June 2013.
- “Glory Days.” Impact: An Anthology of Short Memoirs, edited by CoCo Harris. Telling Our Stories Press, 2012. ISBN 9780982922866
- “My Maleness” (a memoir excerpt). Shadowbox: A Showcase of Contemporary Non-fiction, edited by Harrison Candelaria Fletcher and John Michael Rivera, Spring 2011.

=== Academic essays ===
- “Black Women and the Prison Industrial Complex.” The North Star, 8 Aug 2019.
- “Mirrors and Windows: Black Poetry in this Era.” American Studies with American Studies International, Volume 55, Number 4/Volume 56, Number 1, edited by Sherrie J. Tucker and Randall Maurice Jelks, 2017.
- “Why Celebrate and Study Lucille Clifton’s Work?” The Pierian Literary Journal, edited by Jeffery D. Mack, Spring 2014.
- “Creating an Archetype: Mythological Lilith in Octavia Butler’s Dawn.” WarpLand: A Journal of Black Literature and Ideas, vol. 12, no. 1, 2005.

=== Collaborations ===
- “Reflection and Discussion Guide.” Walking On Water When The Ground Ain't Enuf, edited by Mike E. Tucker. ISBN 9781499520965
- “I Am Wind,” a painting by artist Jennifer Rivera inspired by “Lust,” a poem by DaMaris B. Hill. Between the Lines – Poetry Inspired Abstract Paintings by Jennifer Rivera. Albrecht-Kemper Museum of Art, St. Joseph, MO, September - November 2013.
- “Staccato,” a painting by artist Jennifer Rivera inspired by “The Dance,” a poem by DaMaris B. Hill. Art After Words – A Collaboration: Twenty-Two Poetry Inspired Paintings. South Wind Gallery, Topeka, KS, March – June 2012.

== Professional affiliations ==
- Association of Writers and Writing Programs
- National Women's Studies Association
- The Association for the Study of African American Life and History
