= Marigolds (short story) =

Story set in Depression-era America

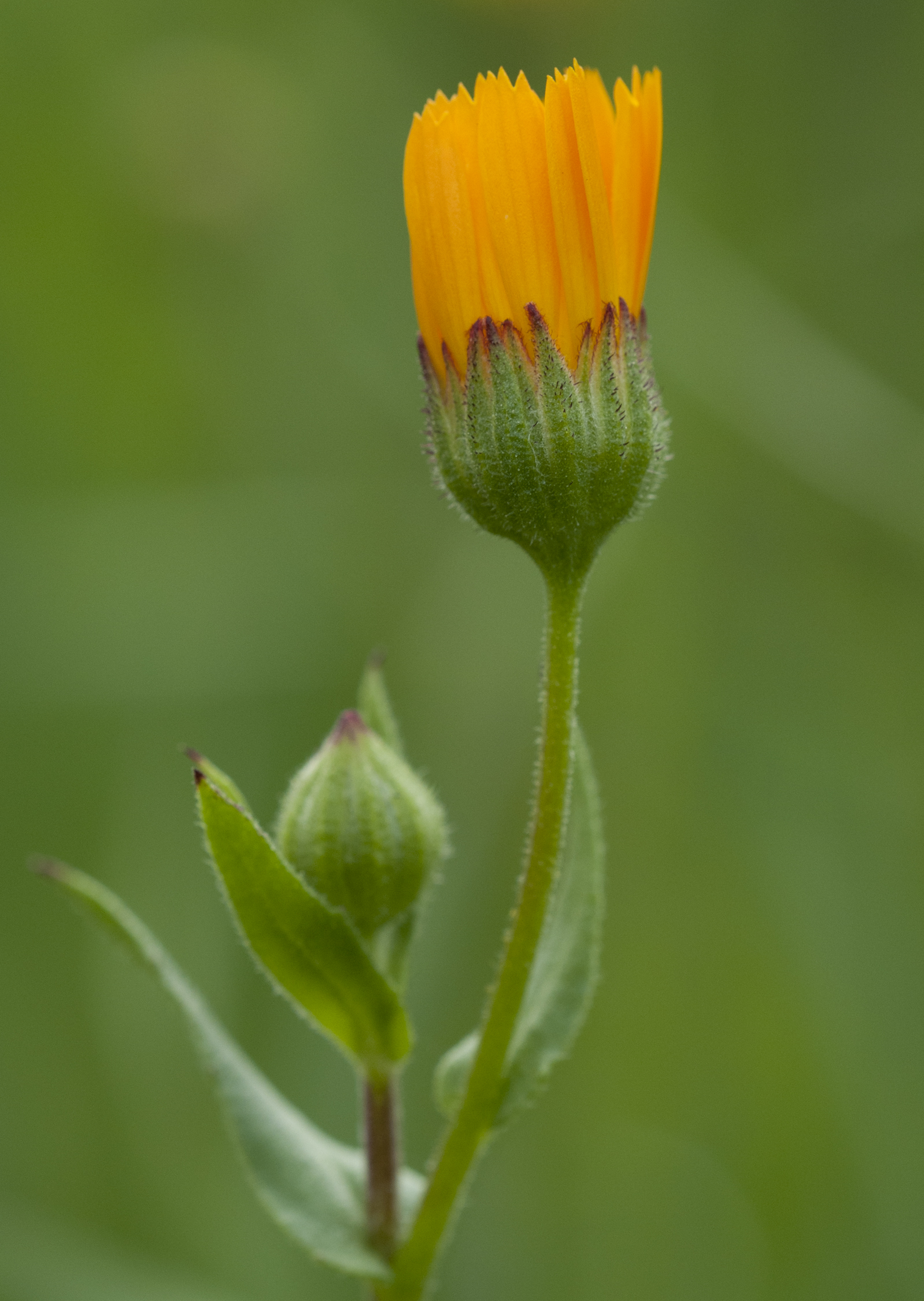
A marigold as seen in a small field.

"Marigolds" is a 1969 short story by Eugenia Collier. The story draws from Collier's early life in rural Maryland during the Great Depression. Its themes include poverty, maturity and the relationship between innocence and compassion. While teaching literature at the Community College of Baltimore County, she published "Marigolds" in Negro Digest, and it won the inaugural Gwendolyn Brooks Prize for Fiction in 1969; it was her first published story.

== Plot ==
The story “Marigolds” is about a young African-American girl named Lizabeth who grew up during the Great Depression. At the beginning of the story, she is childish and does not stop to think about her actions. With their friends, Lizabeth and her brother go to the yard of an elderly woman, Miss Lottie, and harass her while she tends to her garden of marigolds by throwing stones at the marigolds and yelling rude things at her. They also make fun of Miss Lottie's mentally disabled son, John Burke. As they run away from Miss Lottie's house after calling her an "old lady witch", Lizabeth begins to think about her actions and how they affect others. Later that night, Lizabeth hears her parents argue about jobs and money and talk about how they feel they cannot support themselves. Lizabeth's mother works to support her family, but her father is out of a job and is upset because he believes that he, as the man of the house, should earn the money for the family. Out of shock and rage, Lizabeth sneaks over to Miss Lottie's house, ignoring her brother's protests. She goes to the garden to destroy all the marigolds in frustration and tears, only to come face-to-face with the old woman. Miss Lottie sees what Lizabeth has done to her flowers, and she is so shocked that she does not say or do anything. As Lizabeth realizes that the marigolds she destroyed were the only bit of hope and beauty Miss Lottie had left, she starts to regret her actions. In the present, Lizabeth, who is now an adult, looks back on her childish actions with regret and says that their encounter was the end of her innocence and childhood. Lizabeth finally understands that the marigolds were meant to be a symbol of hope, and plants some of her own.
