= Eugenia Collier =

American writer

Eugenia W. Collier (born April 6, 1928) is an American writer and critic best known for her 1969 short story "Marigolds", which won the first Gwendolyn Brooks Prize for Fiction in 1969; it was Collier’s first published story. She was born in Baltimore, Maryland.

Collier's collection, Breeder and Other Stories, was released in 1993. She has also published a play, Ricky, based on her short story of the same name. Other texts that Collier has written or contributed to include Impressions in Asphalt: Images of Urban America (1999); A Bridge to Saying It Well (1970); Sweet Potato Pie (1972); Langston Hughes: Black Genius (1991); Afro-American Writing: An Anthology of Prose and Poetry (1992); and Modern Black Poets: A Collection of Critical Essays (1973). Her work has appeared in Negro Digest, Black World, TV Guide, Phylon, College Language Association Journal, and The New York Times.

Collier's "Marigolds" is one of the most widely anthologized short stories in high school English textbooks. Set against the backdrop of the Great Depression, the story describes the moment that the 14-year-old narrator, Lizabeth, comes of age. It is the moment she is first able to feel the pain of another human being, and Collier's narrative argues that innocence and compassion cannot exist in the same person. It is widely used as a catalyst book for the coming of age unit in high school English classes.

The former English Chair at Morgan State University, Collier has also taught at Coppin State College (now University), the University of Maryland, Howard University, Southern Illinois University, and Atlanta University. She graduated magna cum laude from Howard University in 1948, and was awarded an M.A. from Columbia University two years later. In 1976, she earned a PhD from the University of Maryland.

She married Charles S. Collier in 1950. They had three sons: Charles M. Collier, Robert N. Collier, and Philip Collier.

Since retiring in 1996, Collier continues to live in Baltimore, and occasionally visits classes to discuss creative writing and her stories. She has come out as lesbian in 2000 and continues to be an advocate for LGBTQ+ rights.
