= Annie Allen =

Book of poetry by Gwendolyn Brooks (1949)

- Author: Gwendolyn Brooks
- Language: English
- Genre: Poetry
- Publisher: Harper & Brothers
- Publication date: October 1, 1949
- Publication place: United States
- Pages: 60
- OCLC: 966612

Annie Allen is a book of poetry by American author Gwendolyn Brooks that was published by Harper & Brothers in 1949. The book tells in poetry about the life of Annie Allen, an African-American girl growing to adulthood. It received the Pulitzer Prize for Poetry in 1950 and made Brooks the first African American to ever receive a Pulitzer Prize.

== Story ==
The work consists of three parts about an African-American girl, Annie, growing into womanhood. The first part, titled "Notes from the Childhood and Girlhood", includes 11 poems giving glimpses into Annie's birth, her mother, and her reaction to racism, killing, and death.

"The Anniad", which dominates the collection, is a heroic poem divided into 43 stanzas. The name is a pun combining the protagonist's name and the title of Virgil's epic Aeneid. While not a classical "hero" like Aeneas, Annie's very survival through poverty, racial discrimination, and unhappiness makes her heroic.

Next, three "Appendix" poems tell of Annie's dreams of a lover who goes to war, returns to her, marries her, leaves her, and comes back home to die. In the final section, "The Womanhood" shows Annie's outlook on a world she would like to change. Ultimately, the book of poetry shows how Annie has changed from an egotistic romantic to a realistic idealist.

== Reception ==
Phyllis McGinley, writing for The New York Times Book Review, praised Brooks' use of an experimental form that she called the "sonnet-ballad," calling "The Anniad" "technically dazzling". Kirkus Reviews called the book "refreshing and interesting," but felt that it fell short of the standard Brooks had set in her previous book, A Street In Bronzeville. Annie Allen is more formal and technical than the earlier book, and both critics and scholars sometimes find it challenging to understand.

In 1950 the book won the Eunice Tietjens Prize (awarded by Poetry magazine) and the Pulitzer Prize for poetry.
