= Nora Brooks Blakely =

American literary editor (born 1951)

- Born: September 8, 1951 (age 75)
- Occupation: author
- Parent: Gwendolyn Brooks

Nora Brooks Blakely (born September 8, 1951) is a literary editor and agent. She is the president of Brooks Permissions, a permissions firm that manages the use of literary works by Gwendolyn Brooks and other authors.

She has made public appearances and appeared in documentaries related to Chicago's literary scene, especially the Black Arts movement which grew out of Chicago's Woodlawn neighborhood.

== Personal life ==
She is the daughter of poet Gwendolyn Brooks and her husband, Henry Lowington Blakely Jr., who was known as "the Poet of 63rd Street".

== Career ==
Before running Brooks Permissions, Blakely was producing artistic director and primary playwright of Chocolate Chips Theatre Company in Chicago for 29 years.She taught for eight years in the Chicago Public Schools and spent more than twenty years teaching drama and writing workshops for students and teachers, and she has served on the boards and committees of several youth and arts organizations.

== Brooks Permissions and the Gwendolyn Brooks legacy ==
In 2017, the centennial of her mother's birth, Blakely was described as the only daughter of Gwendolyn Brooks and as president of Brooks Permissions, a licensing agency. Brooks Permissions was a partner in "Centennial Brooks", a tribute gathering of scholars, writers and musicians held at the University of Chicago, the Logan Center for the Arts and the DuSable Museum on 6–8 April 2017. Brooks Permissions published Seasons: A Gwendolyn Brooks Experience, a collection of her mother's poems that Blakely partly edited, to mark the centennial. Commenting on the centennial, she said there had long been a "murmur and a mutter" about how little attention Brooks received at the college and graduate level.

=== Youth poetry awards ===
Blakely has written that after Illinois Governor Otto Kerner asked Gwendolyn Brooks to become Illinois poet laureate in 1968, her mother created the Illinois Poet Laureate Awards, which prioritized poetry by young people from kindergarten through high school. The last of these awards was held in 2000, shortly before Brooks's death, and they were succeeded by the Gwendolyn Brooks Youth Poetry Awards, sponsored and administered by Illinois Humanities and the Poetry Foundation, housed at the Logan Center at the University of Chicago, and supported by Brooks Permissions.

=== One Poem, One Chicago ===
Brooks Permissions was a partner in One Poem, One Chicago, an initiative of the Poetry Foundation, Chicago Public Library, Third World Press Foundation and Northwestern University Press that launched with a reissue of Brooks's collection Blacks at all 81 Chicago Public Library branches. Blakely, as president of Brooks Permissions, said she was excited that her mother's legacy would continue to be celebrated through the project.
