= Furious Flower Poetry Center =

US academic center for Black poetry

The Furious Flower Poetry Center (FFPC) is the first academic center in the United States devoted to Black poetry, housed by James Madison University. Lauren Alleyne is the executive director.

Beyond its decennial conferences, the FFPC is active on and off campus, hosting activities including summer poetry camps for youth, workshops, and visits for poets. Aside from its collection of Black poetry, the center also publishes an online journal, titled The Fight and the Fiddle.

== History ==
The Furious Flower Poetry Center (FFPC) was established by Joanne V. Gabbin in 1999 at James Madison University. The name of the center comes from the Gwendolyn Brooks poem "Second Sermon on the Warpland". In the poem, Brooks writes:

The time

cracks into furious flower. Lifts its face

all unashamed. And sways in wicked grace.

Gabbin was the director of the James Madison University's Honors Program. She hosted the first Furious Furious Flower Poetry Conference in 1994. It was the United States' first scholarly conference on Black poetry. After the success of the second Furious Flower Conference in 2004, James Madison granted FFPC its charter. Through this charter, FFPC became the first academic center in the United States devoted to Black Poetry. Today the center is committed to "cultivating, honoring, and promoting the diverse voices of African-American poets by making the genre accessible to a wide audience and collaborating with educational and cultural institutions, literary organizations, and artists."

== Conferences ==
Since its establishment, the FFPC has held four decennial conferences: A Revolution in African American Poetry (1994), Regenerating the Black Poetic Tradition (2004), Seeding the Future of African American Poetry (2014), and Worlds of Black Poetry (2024). Each conference features poet and scholar readings, performances, and academic presentations.

=== A Revolution in African American Poetry ===
The first conference included more than 30 poets. Among these were Nikki Giovanni, Gwendolyn Brooks, Amiri Baraka, and Sonia Sanchez. This event sparked the beginning of a contemporary Black renaissance.

=== Furious Flower: Regenerating the Black Poetic Tradition ===
The second conference by the FFPC was held on September 22–25, 2004. This conference was held ten years after the first. Dr. Joanne Gabbin dedicated the conference to Amiri Baraka and Sonia Sanchez, architects of the Black Arts Movement. More than 50 poets and scholars shared their work and spoke on Black poetry. After this conference, James Madison established the Furious Flower Poetry Center and Gabbin became the executive director.

=== Seeding the Future of African American Poetry ===
The third conference held by FFPC was September 24–27, 2014, at James Madison. The FFPC dedicated the conference to Rita Dove. The conference also recognized literary trailblazers Toi Derricotte, Michael Harper, Yusef Komunyakaa, Marilyn Nelson, Ishmael Reed, and Quincy Troupe with Lifetime Achievement Awards.

More than 300 scholars traveled to JMU's campus to attend the FFPC's third conference, consisting of concerts, readings, gallery receptions, panels, and group discussions. The university was also very involved in the event, contributing more than a third of the budget. In addition to financial resources, many students, teachers and faculty members devoted their time to the event.

=== Celebrating the Worlds of Black Poetry ===
The fourth conference was held September 18-21 with an estimated 750 people in attendance. The emphasis for this conference was on Black poetry from around the globe as well as the United States. Elizabeth Alexander and Kwame Dawes gave the keynote reading and conversation, hosted by Terrance Hayes and Shara McCallum.

Educational events, poet readings, conversations, art exhibits, open mics, and scholarly presentations showcased the work of more than 50 featured poets and scholars. Featured poets included Rita Dove, Jericho Brown, Camille Dungy, Alexis Pauline Gumbs, Malika Booker, Patricia Jabbeh Wesley, Tyehimba Jess, Remica Bingham-Risher, Lillian Yvonne Bertram, John Keene, Cornelius Eady, Nikky Finney, Matthew Shenoda, Ross Gay, Erica Hunt, francine j. harris, Roger Reeves, DaMaris Hill, Efe Paul Azino, Merle Collins, Danez Smith, Tara Betts, A. B. Spellman, Lorna Goodison, E. Ethelbert Miller, Haryette Mullen, Kei Miller, Frank X Walker, Shara McCallum, Tim Seibles, Anastacia-Renée, Gregory Pardlo, Terrance Hayes, Evie Shockley, Niyi Osundare, Canisia Lubrin, Patricia Smith, and Kwame Dawes.

A laureate reading featured Angela Jackson (Illinois), Curtis Crisler (Indiana), Amanda Johnston (Texas), avery r. young (Chicago, IL), and Glenis Redmond (Greenville, SC), and was hosted by Rita Dove (Poet Laureate of the United States, 1993-1995).

Brittney Spencer gave a finale concert at the Forbes Center for the Performing Arts.

== Partnerships ==
In 2022, Furious Flower and JMU Libraries were awarded a $2 million, 4.5 year grant from the Mellon Foundation: Flowerings Project Phase II: Seeding and Tending Furious Flower’s Digital Archives and Infrastructure. The grant will provide for archival description, digital preservation, and global access to the Furious Flower archives in JMU Libraries Special Collections.

Bringing the celebration of Black poetry along with it, the FFPC celebrated its 25th anniversary at the opening of The Smithsonian's National Museum of African American History and Culture's fall programming. Black poets such as Nikki Giovanni, Yusef Komunyakaa, Sonia Sanchez, Gregory Pardlo, Terrance Hayes, Tyehimba Jess, and the Swazi Poets of South Africa performed some of their pieces. In addition to this, the FFPC hosted workshops and discussions to further recognize Black literature. There were also opportunities to purchase the works of these writers at the event.

The FFPC held a tribute to the late poet Lucille Clifton, a prestigious Black female writer and a recipient of the 2000 National Book Award for Poetry. The event was also another partnership with an outside organization, Virginia Tech Steger Poetry Prize. Director Joanne Gabbin personally worked with Nikki Giovanni to plan this tribute. Beautifully coordinated, 73 poems were read to commemorate each year of the Clifton's life. In addition, the Center called on other Black women poets to read her work, showcasing the tradition of Black women intellect.

Target Stores, Inc. partnered with the FFPC, Maya Angelou and the Poetry Foundation to create an online curriculum where students could have public access to a collection of Black literature. They also hosted several King Day Events throughout the United States with a goal of raising the recognition of Black achievements and societal contributions. One of these events was hosted at Morehouse College in Atlanta, GA, King's alma mater.

The FFPC is included in a partnership with the University of Kansas to create another academic center that will spur the recognition of Black literary intellect. A grant of $189,000 from the National Endowment for the Humanities was given to the University of Kansas to fund an institute that would focus on the teaching and appreciation of African-American poetry. The FFPC partners with KU by sharing its collection of Black literature with the institute. The two collaborated again to create a federally funded three-week program within the institute, "Don't Deny My Voice: Reading and Teaching African American Poetry". Twenty-five teachers were selected to attend.

== Poetry Prizes ==
Furious Flower has offered a poetry prize to emerging writers since 2019. Winners receive a cash prize and are invited to James Madison University for a reading. Winners, honorable mentions, and finalists are also published in the journal Obsidian. Past winners and honorable mentions include:

Year	Winner	Honorable Mention
2024	Michelle Alexander	RaeJeana Brooks
2023	Alafia Nicole Sessions	Marissa Davis
2022	Ariana Benson	Benin Lemus
2021	Aurielle Marie	Jennifer Bartell
2020	Diamond Forde	Nathan John
2019	Rachelle Parker	Cynthia Manick

Furious Flower also sponsored the Quarantine Kwansaba Contest in 2020 in response to the COVID-19 quarantine. The winner was Angel C. Dye and runners up were Glenis Redmond and Sherese Francis.

== Publications ==
- Gabbin, Joanne V.; Alleyne, Lauren K. (December 16, 2019). Furious Flower: Seeding the Future of African American Poetry. TriQuarterly. ISBN 978-0810141544.
- Gabbin, Joanne V. (2009). Shaping memories: Reflections of African American women writers. Jackson: University Press of Mississippi. ISBN 978-1-60473-274-0.
- Gabbin, Joanne V. (January 5, 2009). Mourning Katrina: A Poetic Response to Tragedy. Buena Vista, VA: Mariner Media. ISBN 9780980007787.
- Gabbin, Joanne V. (February 13, 2004). Furious Flower: African American poetry from the Black Arts Movement to the Present. Charlottesville, Va.: University of Virginia Press. ISBN 978-0813922539.
- Gabbin, Joanne V. (1999). The Furious Flowering of African American Poetry. Charlottesville, Va: University of Virginia Press. ISBN 978-0813918419.
- The Painted Word: African American Poets Notecards. Pomegranate. 2004. ISBN 9780764940569.
- Rita Dove's "Ode to My Right Knee" Broadside, Virginia Arts of the Book with Furious Flower Poetry Center 2014.
