= We Real Cool =

Poem by Gwendolyn Brooks

"We Real Cool" is a poem written in 1959 by poet Gwendolyn Brooks and published in her 1960 book The Bean Eaters, her third collection of poetry. The poem has been featured on broadsides, re-printed in literature textbooks and is widely studied in literature classes. It is cited as "one of the most celebrated examples of jazz poetry".

It consists of four verses of two rhyming lines each. The final word in most lines is "we". The next line describes something that "we" do, such as play pool or drop out of school. Brooks has said that the "we"s are meant to be said softly, as though the protagonists in the poem are questioning the validity of their existence. The last lines of the poem, "We / Die soon," indicate the climax, which comes as a surprise after the boasts that have been made previously. It also suggests a moment of self-awareness about the choices that the players have made.

== Origin ==
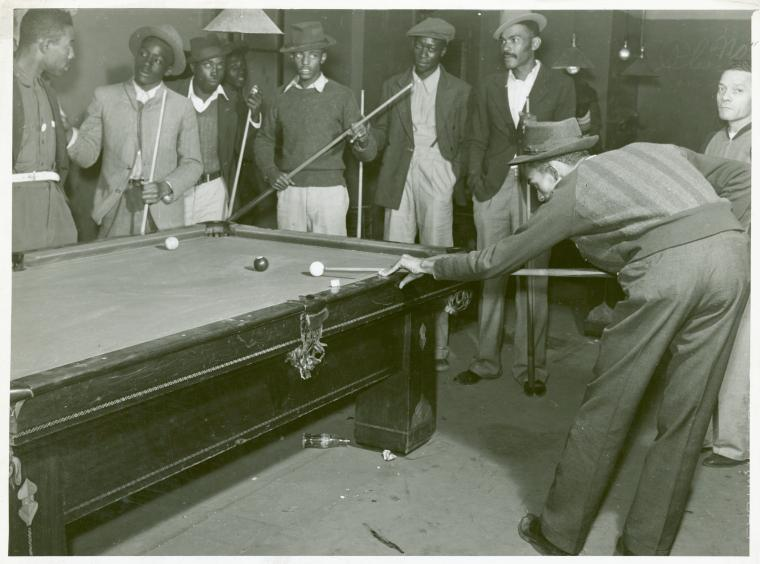
Young African-American men at a pool hall in Clarksdale, Mississippi, 1939.

In an interview Brooks stated that her inspiration for the poem came from her walking in her community and passing a pool hall full of boys. She thought to herself "I wonder how they feel about themselves?" Instead of wondering about why they were not in school, Brooks captured this scene and turned it into the seven pool players at the Golden Shovel.

== Themes and meaning ==
The poem covers a multitude of themes despite its short length, including rebellion and youth. The unique structure offers a subtitle at the beginning of the poem where Brooks writes "The Pool Players / Seven at the Golden Shovel". This gives the poem its characters and setting.

Brooks also said that the seven pool players in the poem are fighting the establishment with their rebellious actions. She states that the establishment is represented by the month of June. In the same interview, Brooks explains how the poem has even been banned in some areas due to the use of the word "jazz" due to a perceived sexual nature — which, Brooks said, was not her intention, as she simply intended for it to represent music.

== In popular culture ==
The poem inspired Terrance Hayes' creation of the poetic form "golden shovel".

The poem was printed in the booklet of Chicago metalcore band The Killing Tree's 2003 We Sing Sin, whose title is a reference to the poem.

It is referenced in the song "We Real Cool" by the band Nick Cave and the Bad Seeds on their 2013 album Push the Sky Away.

The band The Jazz June takes their name from this poem.

The poem is featured in Dominique Morisseau's 2017 play Pipeline.

The poem is referenced in Bruce Springsteen's song "Rosalita (Come Out Tonight)."

The poem is heavily referenced in Lucky Boys Confusion's song "Gwendolyn B. Sings Sin" from the Album "Growing Out Of It".

The poem is referenced as the title of bell hooks's book We Real Cool: Black Men and Masculinity.

The song "Gwendolynn's Apprehension" by rapper Mick Jenkins, from 2018 album Pieces of a Man quotes most of the poem in its chorus.
