= Maud Martha =

1953 novel by Gwendolyn Brooks

First edition

Maud Martha is a 1953 novel written by Pulitzer Prize winning African American poet Gwendolyn Brooks. Structured as a series of thirty-four vignettes, it follows the titular character Maud Martha a young Black girl growing up in late 1920's Chicago. The novel follows Maud from childhood to adulthood through experiences in lower, middle- and upper-class settings in Chicago. Elements of African American culture and themes of race, class and gender are explored throughout the novel.

== Style ==
Structurally, the novel has a nonlinear narrative, that also is explained in poetic language unusual to novels. Critic GerShun Avilez describes it, as a "fragmentary poetic narrative." Other critics focus on its artistic connection to Brooks's poetry; Asali Solomon highlights the language of the novel saying that it is good at "gracefully evoking the nastiness of life." Writing for the Poetry Foundation, Sandra Jackson-Opoku disagreed with the assertion that the narrative of the novel is nonlinear.

== Plot ==
The novel opens with a description of Maud Martha at age seven: a dark-skinned African American girl who loves flowers. She loves flowers because they prove to her that something ordinary can be beautiful too. These early vignettes introduce Maud's family: Her father, Abraham, her mother, Belva, her sister Helen, and her brother Harry. The family is scraping by financially, and an early chapter shows a moment where they could lose their home if their father doesn't get approved for a homeowner's loan. Despite the family's struggles, Maud still views her father as a good provider for the family. On the other hand, her sister Helen does not find her father to be a good provider; despite this, she is still his favorite child. Maud is jealous of Helen because of the attention she receives and her lighter skin tone.

Helen constantly teases Maud about not being able to find a boyfriend because of the books she reads. Despite this, Maud develops a short relationship with a boy named Russell before she meets Paul Phillips. Paul is a light-skinned man whom Maud eventually ends up marrying. Paul assures Maud that they will live a swanky lifestyle; that they will entertain guests and dress well. These promises never come true as Paul constantly disappoints Maud in their marriage as a provider and romantic partner.

There are moments of happiness in their marriage, such as a date they go on to a playhouse. On this date, they're the only colored people in the theatre, but other than some odd looks, they manage to have a great time. Another moment where things are looking up in their relationship is when Paul gets an invitation to the Foxy Cats Club. This invitation, Paul thinks, is proof that he will climb the social ladder. But it only ends up causing Maud to feel insecure because of his dancing with a woman at one of the clubs' social events and a rejection from the Foxy Cats. Following this, Maud has a child with Paul, whom they name Paulette. This child causes Maud to further pressure Paul to provide for their family, but he ends up losing his job. Because of this, Maud has to get a job as a housekeeper. The job ends up having a racist work environment which causes her to walk away. A heartbreaking incident of racism occurs when Maud takes her young daughter Paulette to visit a department store Santa Claus. As they wait in line, they both observe how Santa interacts warmly with each child. However, when Paulette has her turn, he is cold and rude to her. Maud realizes painfully that her innocent daughter will soon learn about racism. The novel ends with Maud's ever hopeful view of the future, feeling thankful for the life she has, her brother coming back from the war, and the expectation of her next child.

== Characters ==
Maud Martha Brown is the narrator and protagonist. The novel follows her from coming of age to dealing with her child experiencing racism. Maud is described as a plain-looking black woman, "the color of cocoa straight." She enjoys the simple things in life and is a sympathetic and happy person. This worldview is seen through her romantic descriptions of mundane experiences like going to the movies, eating apples on the porch, and watching the sunset. Maud is very sentimental, finding it difficult to kill a mouse she had trapped or even to butcher a chicken because she sees humanity in these animals. Despite difficulties such as the stress of losing her home, racism, and disappointment in marriage, Martha reacts with resilience and optimism.

Helen Brown is Maud's older sister. She is fair-skinned and described as pretty, dainty, and graceful. Maud is jealous of the attention Helen receives from her brother, romantic interests, and especially her father. Despite her father's idolization, Helen often makes snide remarks about his most prized possession: his house. Helen also teases Maud about not being able to find a boyfriend.

Harry Brown is Maud's only brother. Harry favors Helen over Maud, opening doors only for Helen even though Maud defended him from bullies. He goes to fight in WWII and returns safely by the end of the novel.

Abraham Brown is Maud's father and a janitor. His most prized possession is his home in a working-class Chicago neighborhood. Maud is jealous of his attention and concern towards Helen over her and his preference for Helen's hair.

Belva Brown is Maud's mother. Maud described her as being "terribly sweet and good to her." She would take Maud and her siblings out on night hikes when they were children. She loves her children equally, not idolizing Helen like the rest of the family.

Ernestine Brown was Maud's grandmother. She was in the hospital and is seen in her final moments. She had lost hearing function when Maud saw her replying to anything said with "Hawh." Maud is shaken up by seeing her grandmother in this condition and following her death reminisces on the moments they shared.

Uncle Tim Uncle Tim was Maud's uncle. Tim is introduced posthumously. He was described as a good husband, having a loud laugh and a big stomach. At his funeral, Maud contemplated on the things she didn't know about her Uncle Tim and the importance of the life he lived

Aunt Nanny is Tim's wife. Maud describes her as a brave woman for not crying at Tim's funeral. Maud also states that Nanny had powdered her face too much for the funeral.

Russel is Maud's first romantic interest. He is described as nice, fun, and dazzling. Maud swore that she would settle Russel, but after a date, she realized he was a flourish and not worth settling for.

Paul Phillips is Maud's light-skinned husband. Paul would not describe Maud as pretty. To him, Maud states someone pretty would be "a little cream-colored thing with curly hair." Paul also does not find himself attractive, describing himself as having "real Negro features" and not being "handsome." Paul admires the high life and hopes to improve his social standing. This is evident by his desire to join the Foxy Cats Club; a social group focused on looking "hep." It is at their ball that he embarrasses Maud by dancing with a red-haired girl named Maella. Maud is also annoyed by his constant clowning and low intelligence. Despite her gripes, she still has a child with Paul, whom they name Paulette.

Mrs. Cray is Maud's neighbor in the apartment building they live in. When Maud was pregnant, she called her doctor to deliver the baby and provided emotional support.

Paulette Phillips is Maud and Paul's daughter. When Maud took her to the mall to see Santa Claus on Christmas, he does not give her the same attention as the white children. Paulette is old enough to perceive this and Maud has a tough time explaining to her why she received this treatment.

Oberto and Marie are a married couple who live in Maud's apartment building. Oberto is a grocery store owner and Marie is a housewife. Marie is described to be a woman obsessed with her looks performing little domestic duties for Oberto. Despite this Oberto is enamored with his wife unlike the other husband's woman in the apartment buildings whose wives perform all sorts of domestic tasks for them.

Eugena Banks is a white woman living in Maud's apartment building. Eugena would sing the same pop music song over and over very badly. Eugena is married to West Indian man who is seldom around and would inquire of Maud on techniques to deal with a "Negro man."

Sonia Johnson is the owner of a salon that Maud frequents. A polite and kind woman even when disrespected. When Miss Ingram a lipstick salesperson uses a racial slur around her after closing a sale Maud is lost for words that Sonia does not "get after her."

Mrs. Burns-Cooper is a white woman whom Maud worked for as a maid. Maud finds her to be snobbish due to her constant bragging about her home and belongings. Maud quits working for Mrs. Burns-cooper due to the racist work environment causing her to feel as if she is being treated like a child.

== Themes ==
=== Class ===
The theme of class is dominant throughout the novel. Often Maud imagines scenes of herself in opulent places and experiencing upper class comforts. Leyda argues that Maud's habit of creating "pleasurable fantasies helps to sustain her in the gray circumstances in her daily life.". Leyda notes that these fantasies that Maud indulges in are similar to bread "feeding her spirit as well as her body" in order for her to get over the challenges of daily life. As Leyda analyzes Maud realizes these fantasies are not obtainable but optimistically adds bits of these fantasies through how she decorates her home.

Class is also explored in the novel through her interactions with people in Chicago. Examples can be seen through her childhood in a working-class household and her experiences with higher class households like when she worked with Mrs. Burns-Cooper.

=== Race ===
Race is explored in Maud Martha through the ordinary experiences Blacks faced in an unjust society. It is also seen in Maud's compromises in many facets of her life, Rivers stating that "These compromises were made more painful by the mandates of poverty and the color of her skin."

Race is prevalent throughout the whole novel Leyda states that race is "a central issue in the novel, even when unspoken." Leyda argues that Maud wishes for an upper-class lifestyle, required the "privilege of whiteness."

=== Gender ===
Rivers argues that the theme of gender is the primary theme of Maud Martha. Her review claims the novel is "the story of the average woman in her struggles as daughter, wife, and mother." Rivers further states that Maud Martha explores the common wishes of every woman and the compromises they have to make in accomplishing them.

== Reception ==
Reviewing the novel for The Journal of Negro Education in 1954, Gertrude B. Rivers stated the novel is "charming and delightful reading." She further claims that Brook's selection shows her knowledge in the "subtler springs of human nature."

Reviewing the novel for NPR in 2006, Asali Solomon said the character's life "resembles your life or mine: good days and bad, no headlines."
