= Golden shovel =

Poetic form

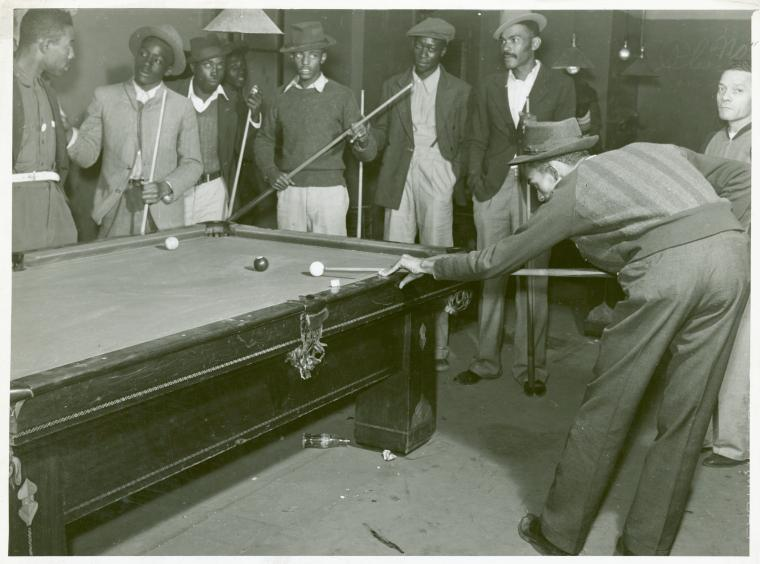
Gwendolyn Brooks's original "We Real Cool" poem imagines seven teenagers at a pool hall called the "Golden Shovel".

A golden shovel is a poetic form in which the last word of each line has been taken from a section of a second, pre-existing poem to which the poet is paying homage. It is conventional to present the borrowed end words in their original order; however, the subject matter of the new poem may differ entirely from that of the original. The form was created by Terrance Hayes, whose poem "The Golden Shovel" from his 2010 collection Lighthead is based on Gwendolyn Brooks's "We Real Cool" (which begins with an epigraph that includes the phrase "Golden Shovel").

Writer's Digest described it as "sort of in the tradition of the cento and erasure", but with "a lot more room for creativity," while in The Kenyon Review, Dora Malech called it "a kind of reverse-acrostic variation". Claudia Rankine noted that a golden shovel "always remains in conversation with" the poem on which it is based, while Don Share observed that golden shovels "can be quite different in subject, tone, and texture from the source poem, depending upon the ingenuity and imagination of the poet". In a discussion at LitHub, Adam Levin stated that he considers it to be a "puzzle" that can "challenge" poets, and that in terms of difficulty it is comparable to sestina and pantoum.

== Origin ==
When Hayes decided that his five-year-old son should memorize "We Real Cool", the two of them recited the poem so many times that "(o)ne night, even as [Hayes] began digging for [his] own words, Brooks kept playing in [his] head. [He] decided to string the whole poem down the page and write into it."
