= Aurielle Marie =

American poet and activist (born 1994)

Aurielle Marie (born 1994) is an American poet and activist. Their debut collection Gumbo Ya Ya received the 2020 Cave Canem Poetry Prize and the Lambda Literary Award for Bisexual Poetry.

== Early life ==
Marie was born in Atlanta, Georgia and raised on the southwest side of the city. Growing up, they were active in Black-oriented youth organizations that nurtured creativity. As a result, they began writing poetry in their childhood.

== Career ==
Marie has worked with Atlanta-based organizations focused on civil rights and other social justice issues. They first became involved with community organizing after the killing of Michael Brown and the Ferguson uprising that followed. Marie was an organizer with the grassroots organization It's Bigger Than You.

Marie said their poetry focuses on "my sexuality, my body, my trauma, and the world I live in." Marie has published poetry in outlets including The Rumpus, BOATT, Poets.org, The Adroit Journal, Poetry Daily, and TriQuarterly Press.

They won the 2020 Cave Canem Poetry Prize for their debut collection Gumbo Ya Ya. The collection was published by University of Pittsburgh Press and released in fall 2021. Poets & Writers described the collection as "a swirl of texts and voices, with visually inventive typography and poems, some featuring words cascading down the page, layered on top of one another, or pushing beyond the margins. The book subverts and refuses form."

== Personal life ==
Marie is genderqueer and uses they/she pronouns.

== Works ==
- Marie, Aurielle (2021). Gumbo Ya Ya. University of Pittsburgh Press. ISBN 9780822988380.

== Accolades ==
- 2018 – Lambda Literary Writer Retreat fellow
- 2019 – Los Angeles Review Literary Award for Poetry (for "The Blues, Reproductive")
- 2019–2020 – Ploughshares Emerging Writers Contest
- 2020 – Cave Canem Poetry Prize (for Gumbo Ya Ya)
- 2021 – Furious Flower Poetry Prize
- 2022 – Lambda Literary Award for Bisexual Poetry (for Gumbo Ya Ya)
- 2022 – Georgia Author of the Year Award, Poetry Full-Length Book (for Gumbo Ya Ya)
- 2022 – Out100
