= Lauren K. Alleyne =

Trinidadian-American poet and writer (born 1979)

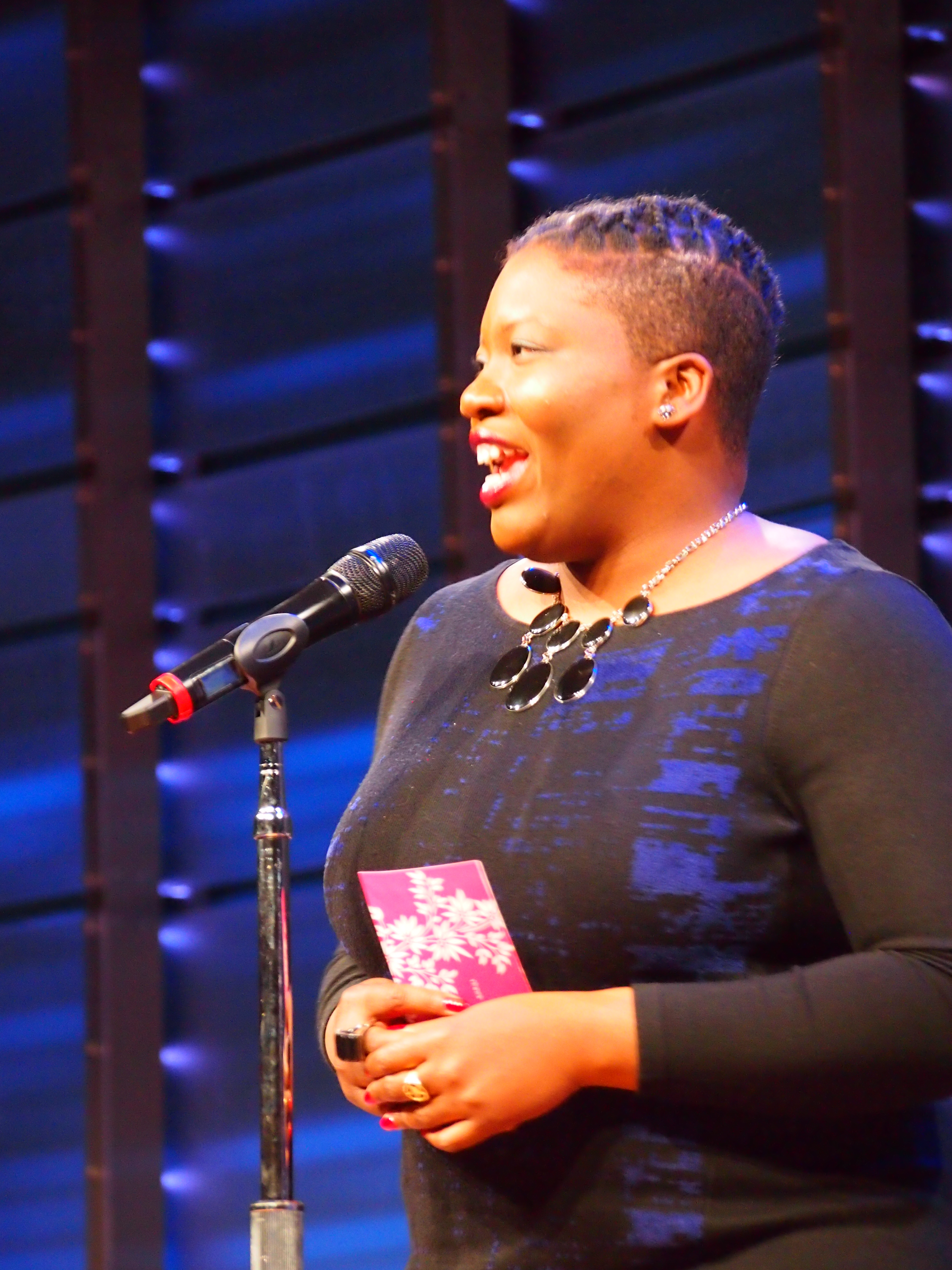
- Alleyne in 2016
- Born: June 8, 1979 (age 47); Trinidad and Tobago
- Education: St. Francis College; Iowa State University; Cornell University
- Occupations: Poet, author, educator
- Website: www.laurenkalleyne.com

Lauren K. Alleyne (born June 8, 1979) is a Trinidadian American poet, fiction and nonfiction writer, and educator born and raised in the dual-island Caribbean nation of Trinidad and Tobago.

== Biography ==
In 1997, Alleyne moved to the United States to begin her undergraduate studies in Radiologic Science and Nuclear Medical Technology at St. Francis College in New York. It was not until her junior year that she decided to shift her focus towards English, then graduated with honors from St. Francis College with a Bachelor of Arts degree in English Literature. In 2002, she received her Master of Fine Arts degree in English with an emphasis on creative writing from Iowa State University. Finally, in January 2006, she received her Master of Fine Arts in Creative Writing, as well as a graduate certificate in Feminist, Gender, and Sexuality studies from Cornell University.

Alleyne is also a graduate of Cave Canem, a non-profit literary service organization with administrative and programming headquarters that works to promote and advance under-represented African-American poets in the literary world, and to provide an environment that fosters the growth of African-American voices and artistry. In addition to serving her talents in the literary community, Alleyne also worked as the Poet-in-Residence and as an Assistant Professor in English at the University of Dubuque in Iowa. Currently, Alleyne works as a Professor in English, and the Executive Director of the Furious Flower Poetry Center, founded by Dr. Joanne V. Gabbin, at James Madison University in Virginia. Alleyne serves as editor-in-chief of Furious Flower's literary journal, The Fight & The Fiddle, and in 2024, she convened the fourth decennial Furious Flower Poetry Conference, Celebrating the Worlds of Black Poetry. Alleyne is a member of the Wintergreen Women Writers Collective.

Alleyne's poems and articles have appeared in several literary journals, including The Atlantic, The New York Times, Tin House, Affilia, Small Axe Project, and Women's Studies Quarterly, and in anthologies such as Gathering Ground: A Reader Celebrating Cave Canem's First Decade and Let Spirit Speak! Cultural Journeys Through the African Diaspora.

== Awards and accolades ==
Alleyne has received many awards and accolades, including the following:

- International Publication Prize from the Atlanta Review
- The Robert Chasen Graduate Poetry Prize at Cornell
- 2003: Atlantic Monthly Student Poetry Prize
- 2003: Gival Press Tri-Language Poetry Contest (Honourable Mention)
- 2009: Reginald Shepherd Memorial Poetry Prize (Honourable Mention)
- 2009, 2011: Dorothy Sargent Rosenburg Prize
- 2010: Small Axe Literary Prize
- 2010: Cave Canem Poetry Prize (Honourable Mention)
- 2012: Lyrical Iowa Award/Lyric Iowa Poetry Prize (2nd place)
- 2013: Richard Peterson Award (finalist)
- 2017: Green Rose Prize For Poetry (Winner)
- 2019: Best of the Net (Finalist)
- 2020: NAACP Nomination for Outstanding Poetry (Nomination)
- 2020: Library of Virginia Poetry Prize (Finalist)
- 2022: State Council for Higher Education in Virginia Outstanding Faculty Award

== Publications ==
=== Books ===
- —— (2014). Difficult Fruit. Peepal Tree Press. ISBN 9781845232276.
- —— (2019). Honeyfish. New Issues Press. ISBN 978-1845234416.
- —— (2020). Seeding the Future of African American Poetry. TriQuarterly. ISBN 978-0810141544.

=== Selections available online ===
- Academy of American Poets Poem-a-Day Selections
- Catalogue of What We Attempt to Survive
- 18
- Killed Boy, Beautiful World
- "The Body, Given"
- "Ode to the Belly"
- "The place of no dreams"
- "Love in B Minor"
- "To My Lover’s Partner, Upon their Separation"
- "Ash Wednesday"
- "Fear and Trembling"
- "Veneration"

=== Short stories available online ===
- "The Way the Body Goes"
- 2012: Writing from Within the War on Women

=== Collaborations ===
Either/Or. Collaboration with Matthew Fisher (2021), Intermission Museum

Cotton Collaboration with LyricFest (2023)

The Gretel Project Collaboration with Catherine Chung, Tomiko Jones, Sidney Boquiren, Amy Ressler
