= Harrison Candelaria Fletcher =

American journalist and author

- Website: harrisoncandelariafletcher.com

Harrison Candelaria Fletcher is an American journalist and author. In 2013 his book Descanso for My Father: Fragments of a Life received a bronze medal for non-fiction in the Independent Publisher Book Awards, and also a Colorado Book Award for non-fiction. The book is a memoir of his father, who died when the author was a baby. His second book, Presentimiento: A Life in Dreams, is about his mother.

== Books ==
- Descanso for My Father: Fragments of a Life. Lincoln: University of Nebraska Press, 2012. ISBN 9780803240162.
- Presentimiento: A Life in Dreams. Pittsburgh: Autumn House Press, 2016. ISBN 9781938769139.
- Finding Querencia: Essays from In-Between. Columbus: Mad Creek Books, 2022. ISBN 9780814258170.
