= Gwendolyn Brooks =

American writer (1917–2000)

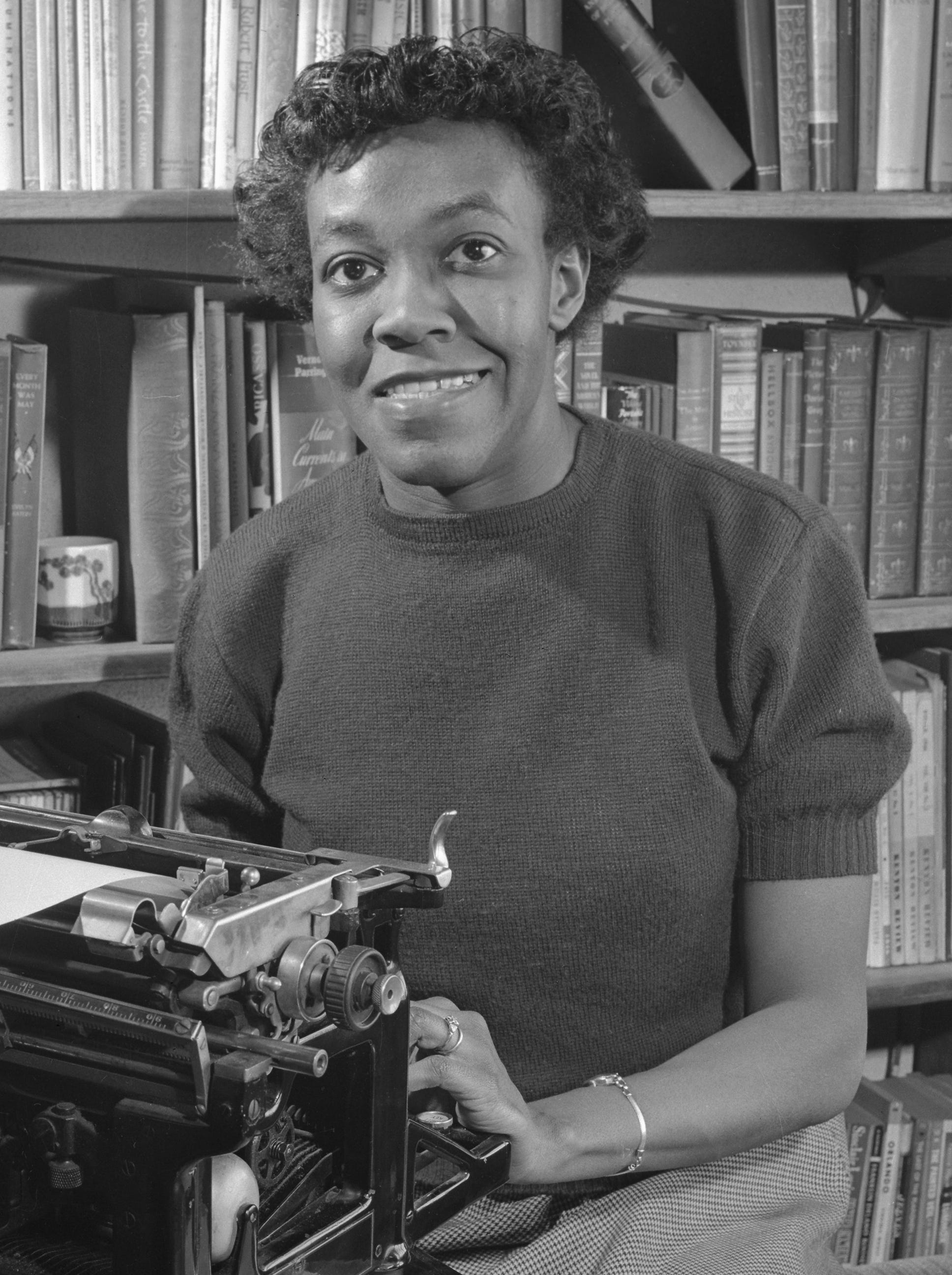
- Brooks in 1950
- Born: Gwendolyn Elizabeth Brooks; June 7, 1917; Topeka, Kansas, U.S.
- Died: December 3, 2000 (aged 83); Chicago, Illinois, U.S.
- Education: Kennedy-King College
- Occupation: Poet
- Spouse(s): Henry Lowington Blakely, Jr. (m. 1939; died 1996)
- Children: 2, including Nora Brooks Blakely
- Writing career
- Period: 1930–2000
- Notable works: A Street in Bronzeville, Annie Allen, Winnie
- Notable awards: Pulitzer Prize for Poetry (1950); Robert Frost Medal (1989); National Medal of Arts (1995)

Gwendolyn Elizabeth Brooks (June 7, 1917 – December 3, 2000) was an American poet, author, and teacher. Her work often dealt with the personal celebrations and struggles of ordinary people in her community. She won the Pulitzer Prize for Poetry on May 1, 1950 for Annie Allen, making her the first African American to receive a Pulitzer Prize.

Throughout her prolific writing career, Brooks received many more honors. A lifelong resident of Chicago, she was appointed Poet Laureate of Illinois in 1968, a position she held until her death 32 years later. She was also named the U.S. Poet Laureate for the 1985–86 term. In 1976, she became the first African-American woman inducted into the American Academy of Arts and Letters.

== Early life ==
Gwendolyn Elizabeth Brooks was born on June 7, 1917, in Topeka, Kansas, and was raised on the South Side of Chicago, Illinois. She was the first child of David Anderson Brooks and Keziah (Wims) Brooks. Her father, a janitor for a music company, had hoped to pursue a career as a doctor but sacrificed that aspiration to support getting married and raising a family. Her mother was a school teacher as well as a concert pianist trained in classical music. Brooks' mother had taught at the Topeka school that later became involved in the Brown v. Board of Education racial desegregation case. Family lore held that Brooks' paternal grandfather had escaped slavery to join the Union forces during the American Civil War.

When Brooks was six weeks old, her family moved to Chicago during the Great Migration, and from then on, Chicago remained her home. She would closely identify with Chicago for the rest of her life. In a 1994 interview, she remarked:

Living in the city, I wrote differently than I would have if I had been raised in Topeka, KS ... I am an organic Chicagoan. Living there has given me a multiplicity of characters to aspire for. I hope to live there the rest of my days. That's my headquarters.

Brooks started her formal education at Forestville Elementary School on Chicago's South Side. She then attended a prestigious integrated high school in the city with a predominantly white student body, Hyde Park High School; transferred to the all-black Wendell Phillips High School; and finished her schooling at integrated Englewood High School.

According to biographer Kenny J. Williams, due to the social dynamics of the various schools, in conjunction with the era in which she attended them, Brooks faced much racial injustice. Over time, this experience helped her understand the prejudice and bias in established systems and dominant institutions, not only in her own surroundings but in every relevant American mindset.

Brooks began writing at an early age and her mother encouraged her, saying: "You are going to be the lady Paul Laurence Dunbar." During her teenage years, she began filling books with ''careful rhymes'' and ''lofty meditations", as well as submitting poems to various publications. Her first poem was published in American Childhood when she was 13. By the time she had graduated from high school in 1935, she was already a regular contributor to The Chicago Defender.

After her early educational experiences, Brooks did not pursue a four-year college degree because she knew she wanted to be a writer and considered it unnecessary. "I am not a scholar," she later said. "I'm just a writer who loves to write and will always write." She graduated in 1936 from a two-year program at Wilson Junior College, now known as Kennedy-King College, and at first worked as a typist to support herself while she pursued her career.

== Career ==
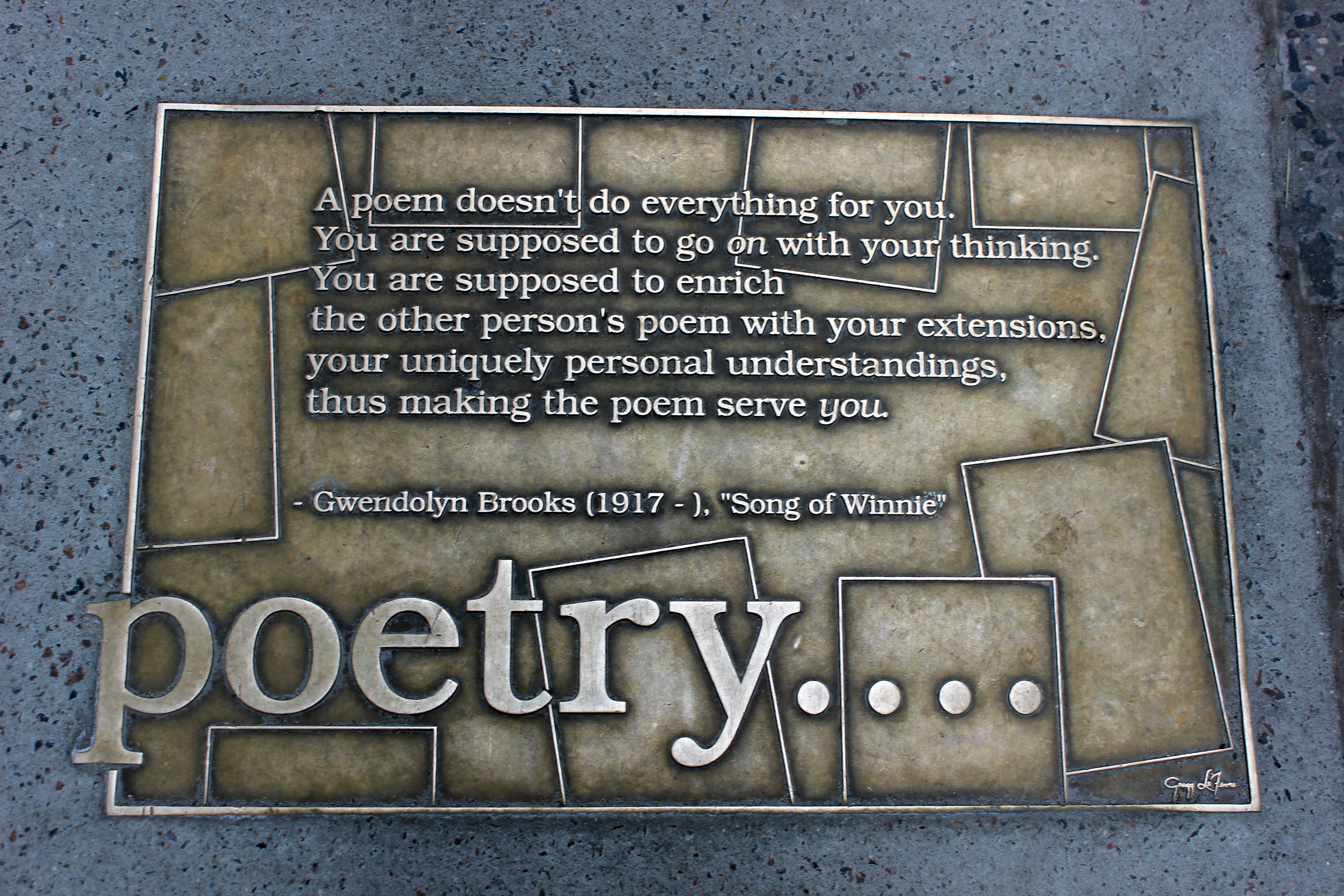
"Song of Winnie", Library Walk, New York City

=== Writing ===
Brooks published her first poem, "Eventide", in a children's magazine, American Childhood, when she was 13 years old. By the age of 16, she had already written and published approximately 75 poems. At 17, she started submitting her work to "Lights and Shadows", the poetry column of the Chicago Defender, an African-American newspaper. Her poems, many published while she attended Wilson Junior College, ranged in style from traditional ballads and sonnets to poems using blues rhythms in free verse. In her early years, she received commendations on her poetic work and encouragement from James Weldon Johnson, Richard Wright and Langston Hughes. James Weldon Johnson sent her the first critique of her poems when she was only 16 years old.

Her characters were often drawn from the inner-city life that Brooks knew well. She said, "I lived in a small second-floor apartment at the corner, and I could look first on one side and then the other. There was my material."

By 1941, Brooks was taking part in poetry workshops. A particularly influential one was organized by Inez Cunningham Stark, an affluent white woman with a strong literary background. Stark offered writing workshops at the new South Side Community Art Center, which Brooks attended. It was here she gained momentum in finding her voice and a deeper knowledge of the techniques of her predecessors. Renowned poet Langston Hughes stopped by the workshop and heard her read "The Ballad of Pearl May Lee". In 1944, she achieved a goal she had been pursuing through continued unsolicited submissions since she was 14 years old: two of her poems were published in Poetry magazine's November issue. In the autobiographical information she provided to the magazine, she described her occupation as a "housewife".

Brooks published her first book of poetry, A Street in Bronzeville (1945), with Harper & Brothers, after a strong show of support to the publisher from author Richard Wright. It consists of a series of poems related the lives of African Americans in the Chicago neighborhood. Wright said to the editors who solicited his opinion on Brooks' work:

There is no self-pity here, not a striving for effects. She takes hold of reality as it is and renders it faithfully. ... She easily catches the pathos of petty destinies; the whimper of the wounded; the tiny accidents that plague the lives of the desperately poor, and the problem of color prejudice among Negroes.

The book earned instant critical acclaim for its authentic and textured portraits of life in Bronzeville. Brooks later said it was a glowing review by Paul Engle in the Chicago Tribune that "initiated My Reputation". Engle stated that Brooks' poems were no more "Negro poetry" than Robert Frost's work was "white poetry". Brooks received her first Guggenheim Fellowship in 1946 and was included as one of the "Ten Young Women of the Year" in Mademoiselle magazine.

Brooks' second book of poetry, Annie Allen (1949), focused on the life and experiences of a young Black girl growing into womanhood in the Bronzeville neighborhood of Chicago. The book was awarded the 1950 Pulitzer Prize for poetry, and was also awarded Poetry magazine's Eunice Tietjens Prize.

In 1953, Brooks published her first and only narrative book, a novella titled Maud Martha, which is a series of 34 vignettes about the experience of black women entering adulthood, consistent with the themes of her previous works. Maud Martha follows the life of a black woman named Maud Martha Brown as she moves about life from childhood to adulthood. It tells the story of "a woman with doubts about herself and where and how she fits into the world. Maud's concern is not so much that she is inferior but that she is perceived as being ugly," states author Harry B. Shaw in his book Gwendolyn Brooks. Maud suffers prejudice and discrimination not only from white individuals but also from black individuals who have lighter skin tones than hers, something that is a direct reference to Brooks' personal experience. Eventually, Maud stands up for herself by turning her back on a patronizing and racist store clerk. "The book is ... about the triumph of the lowly," Shaw comments. In contrast, literary scholar Mary Helen Washington emphasizes Brooks's critique of racism and sexism, calling Maud Martha "a novel about bitterness, rage, self-hatred, and the silence that results from suppressed anger".

In 1967, the year of Langston Hughes's death, Brooks attended the Second Black Writers' Conference at Nashville's Fisk University. Here, according to one version of events, she met activists and artists such as Imamu Amiri Baraka, Don L. Lee and others who exposed her to new black cultural nationalism. Recent studies argue that she had been involved in leftist politics in Chicago for many years and, under the pressures of McCarthyism, adopted a black nationalist posture as a means of distancing herself from her prior political connections. Brooks's experience at the conference inspired many of her subsequent literary activities. She taught creative writing to some of Chicago's Blackstone Rangers, otherwise a violent criminal gang. In 1968, she published one of her most famous works, In the Mecca, a long poem about a mother's search for her lost child in a Chicago apartment building. The poem was nominated for the National Book Award for poetry.

Following her publications with Harper, Brooks published titles beginning in the 1960s with independent Black-owned publishers: Broadside Press, Third World Press as well as her own small presses, Brooks Press and The David Company.

Her autobiographical Report From Part One, including reminiscences, interviews, photographs and vignettes, came out in 1972, and Report From Part Two was published in 1995, when she was almost 80. Her other works include Primer for Blacks (1980), Young Poet’s Primer (1980), To Disembark (1981), The Near-Johannesburg Boy, and Other Poems (1986), Blacks (1987), Winnie (1988), and Children Coming Home (1991). She was a contributor to the 1992 anthology Daughters of Africa, edited by Margaret Busby.

=== Teaching ===
Brooks said her first teaching experience was at the University of Chicago when she was invited by author Frank London Brown to teach a course in American literature. It was the beginning of her lifelong commitment to sharing poetry and teaching writing. Brooks taught extensively around the country and held posts at Columbia College Chicago, Northeastern Illinois University, Chicago State University, Elmhurst College, Columbia University, and the City College of New York.

=== Archives ===
The Rare Book & Manuscript Library of the University of Illinois acquired Brooks's archives from her daughter Nora Blakely. In addition, the Bancroft Library at UC Berkeley has a collection of her personal papers, especially from 1950 to 1989.

== Family life ==
In 1939, Brooks married Henry Lowington Blakely Jr., whom she met after joining Chicago's NAACP Youth Council. They had two children: Henry Lowington Blakely III, and Nora Brooks Blakely. Brooks' husband died in 1996.

From mid-1961 to late 1964, Henry III served in the U.S. Marine Corps, first at Marine Corps Recruit Depot San Diego and then at Marine Corps Air Station Kaneohe Bay. During this time, Brooks mentored her son's fiancée, Kathleen Hardiman, in writing poetry. Upon his return, Blakely and Hardiman married in 1965. Brooks had so enjoyed the mentoring relationship that she began to engage more frequently in that role with the new generation of young black poets.

Gwendolyn Brooks died at her Chicago home on December 3, 2000, aged 83. She is buried in Lincoln Cemetery.

== Honors and legacy ==
=== Honors ===
- 1946, Guggenheim Fellow in Poetry.
- 1949, Poetry magazine's Eunice Tietjens Memorial Prize
- 1950, Pulitzer Prize in Poetry Gwendolyn Brooks in 1950 became the first African-American to be given a Pulitzer Prize. It was awarded for the volume, Annie Allen, which chronicled in verse the life of an ordinary black girl growing up in the Bronzeville neighborhood on Chicago's South Side.
- 1968, appointed Poet Laureate of Illinois, a position she held until her death in 2000
- 1969, Anisfield-Wolf Book Award
- 1973, Honorary consultant in American letters to the Library of Congress
- 1976, inducted into the American Academy of Arts and Letters
- 1976, the Shelley Memorial Award of the Poetry Society of America
- 1979, Langston Hughes Medal
- 1980, appointed to Presidential Commission on the National Agenda for the Eighties.
- 1981, Gwendolyn Brooks Junior High School in Harvey, Illinois dedicated in her honor.
- 1985, selected as the Consultant in Poetry to the Library of Congress, an honorary one-year term, known as the Poet Laureate of the United States
- 1988, inducted into the National Women's Hall of Fame
- 1989, awarded the Robert Frost Medal for lifetime achievement by the Poetry Society of America
- 1994, chosen to present the National Endowment for the Humanities' Jefferson Lecture.
- 1994, received the National Book Foundation's Medal for Distinguished Contribution to American Letters
- 1995, presented with the National Medal of Arts
- 1997, awarded the Order of Lincoln, the highest honor granted by the State of Illinois.
- 1999, awarded the Academy of American Poets Fellowship for distinguished poetic achievement

=== Legacy ===
- First awarded in 1969 (for “Marigolds” by Eugenia Collier): Gwendolyn Brooks Prize for Fiction
- 1970: Gwendolyn Brooks Cultural Center, Western Illinois University, Macomb, Illinois
- 1990: Gwendolyn Brooks Center for Black Literature and Creative Writing, Chicago State University
- 1994: Furious Flower Poetry Center, the United States's first academic center for Black poetry, takes its name in honor of Brooks and her poem, “The Second Sermon on the Warpland” (1968)
- 1995: Gwendolyn Brooks Elementary School, Aurora, Illinois
- 2001: Gwendolyn Brooks College Preparatory Academy, Chicago, Illinois
- 2002: 100 Greatest African Americans
- 2002: Gwendolyn Brooks Middle School, Oak Park, Illinois
- 2003: Gwendolyn Brooks Illinois State Library, Springfield, Illinois
- 2004: Hyacinth Park in Chicago was renamed Gwendolyn Brooks Park.
- 2010: Inducted into the Chicago Literary Hall of Fame.
- 2012: Honored on a United States' postage stamp.
- 2017: Various centennial events in Chicago marked what would have been her 100th birthday.
- 2017–18: "Our Miss Brooks @ 100" (OMB100) a celebration of the life of Brooks (born June 7, 1917), which ran through June 17, 2018. The opening ceremony on February 2, 2017, at the Art Institute of Chicago featured readings and discussions of Brooks' influence by Pulitzer Prize-winning poets Rita Dove, Yusef Komunyakaa, Gregory Pardlo, Tracy K. Smith, and Natasha Trethewey.
- 2018: On what would have been her 101st birthday, a statue of her, titled "Gwendolyn Brooks: The Oracle of Bronzeville", was unveiled at Gwendolyn Brooks Park in Chicago.
- 2021: Gwendolyn Brooks Memorial Park dedicated in Macomb, Illinois.
- 2022: Brooks was the subject of an exhibition, Gwendolyn Brooks: A Poet’s Work In Community, at the Morgan Library & Museum.

== Works ==
The Poetry Foundation lists these works among others:

- A Street in Bronzeville, Harper, 1945.
- Annie Allen, Harper, 1949.
- Maud Martha, Harper, 1953.
- Bronzeville Boys and Girls, Harper, 1956.
- The Bean Eaters, Harper, 1960.
- We Real Cool, Brooks Press, 1960.
- In the Mecca, Harper, 1968.
- For Illinois 1968: A Sesquicentennial Poem, Harper, 1968.
- Riot, Broadside Press, 1969.
- Family Pictures, Broadside Press, 1970.
- Aloneness, Broadside Press, 1971.
- Report from Part One: An Autobiography, Broadside Press, 1972.
- Black Love, Brooks Press, 1982.
- Mayor Harold Washington; and, Chicago, the I Will City, Brooks Press, 1983.
- The Near-Johannesburg Boy, and Other Poems, David Co., 1987.
- Winnie, Third World Press, 1988.
- Report from Part Two, Third World Press, 1996.
- In Montgomery, and Other Poems, Third World Press, 2003.

Several collections of multiple works by Brooks were also published.

== Papers ==
- Letters by Brooks, Atlanta University, Atlanta, Georgia.
- Typescript for Annie Allen, State University of New York at Buffalo

== See also ==
- African-American literature
- Chicago Literature
- Golden shovel, a poetic form inspired by Brooks' work
- List of African-American firsts
- List of poets
- List of Poets from the United States
