= Lied Center of Kansas =

Performing arts center at the University of Kansas

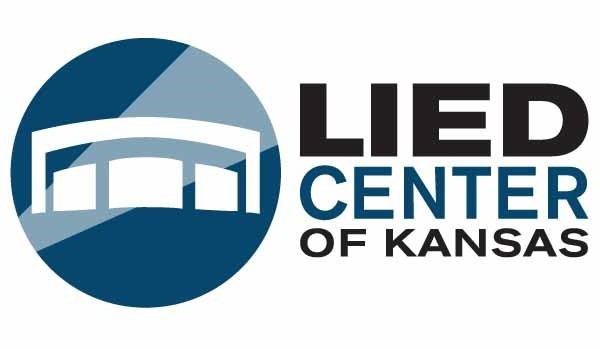

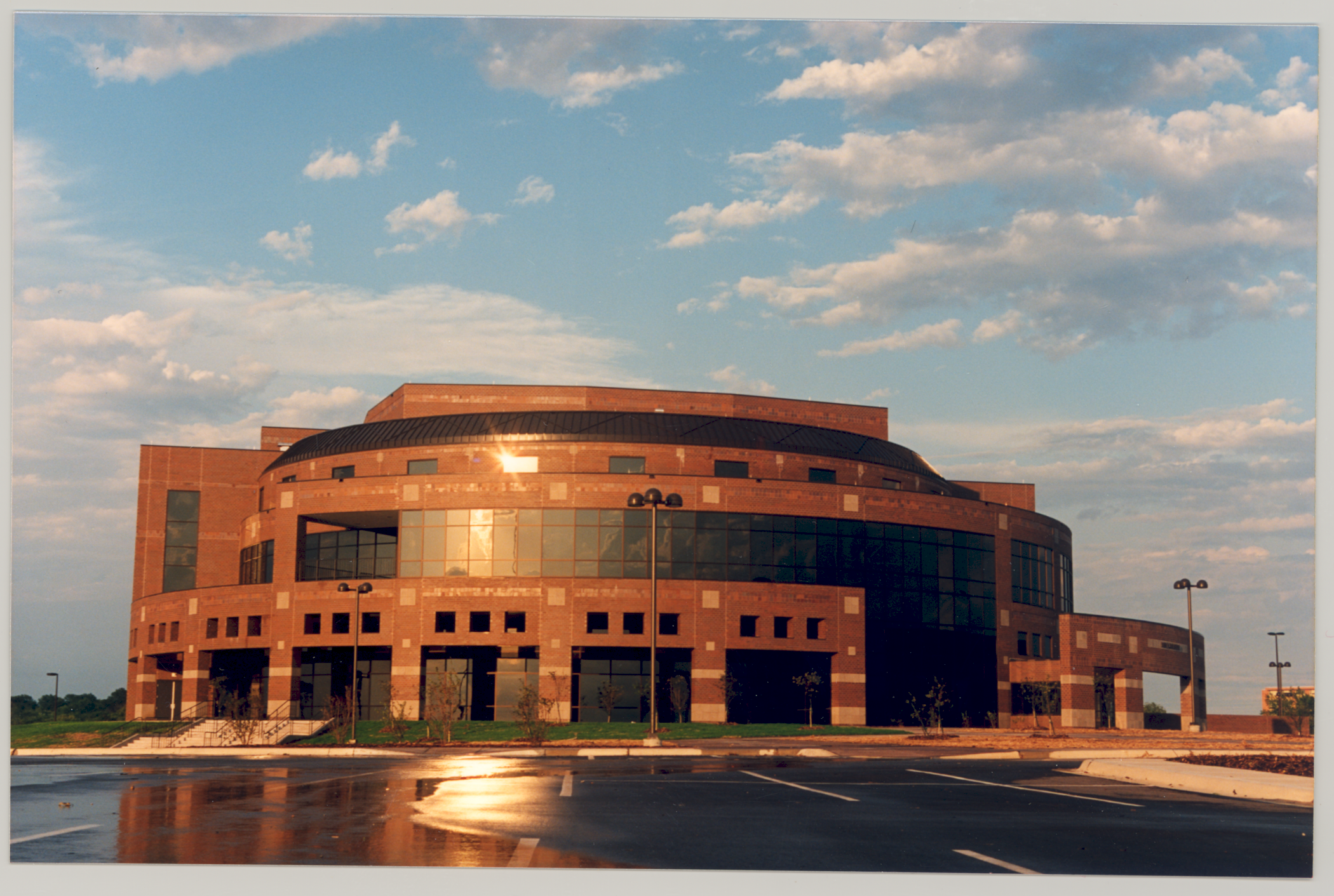
- Interactive map of Lied Center of Kansas
- Address: 1600 Stewart Drive
- Location: Lawrence, Kansas
- Coordinates: 38.95494°N 95.26289°W
- Owner: University of Kansas
- Capacity: Total: 2,183; Auditorium: 1,983; Pavilion: 200
- Event: Performing arts

Construction
- Built: 1993
- Opened: September 28, 1993

Website
- lied.ku.edu

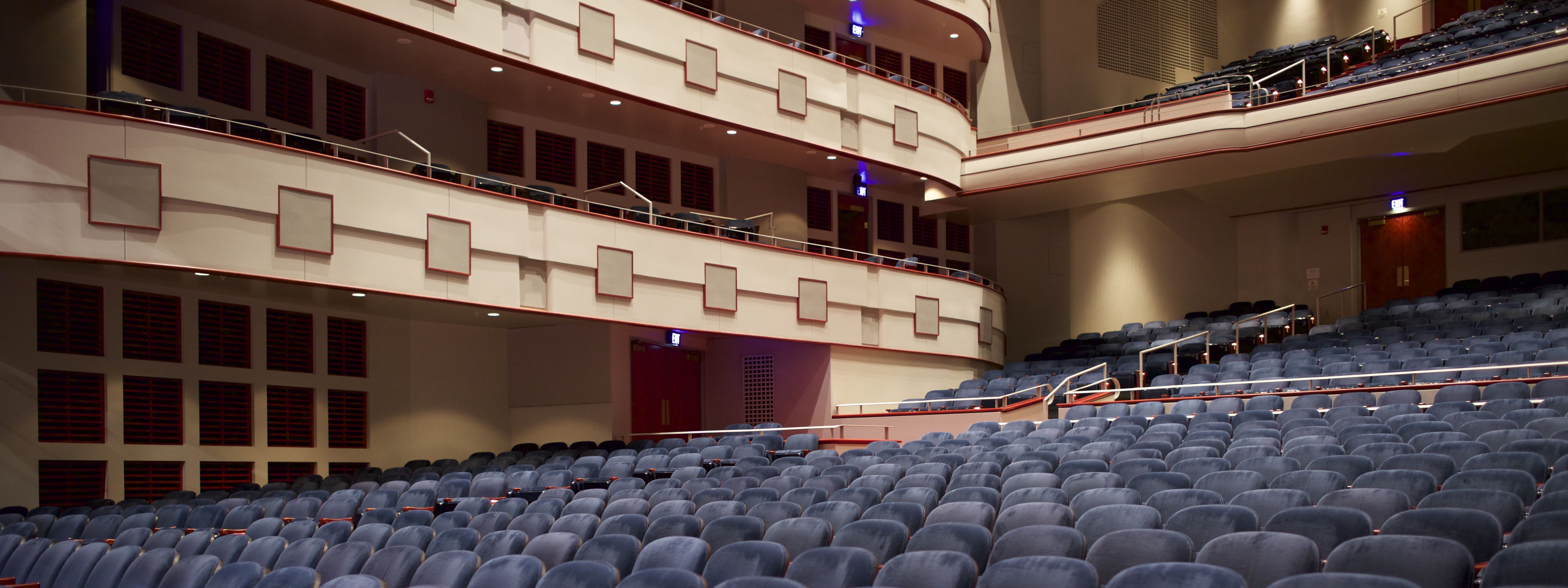
The auditorium

The Lied Center of Kansas (/liːd/ LEED) is the main performing arts center at the University of Kansas, and one of three performing arts dedicated centers on the campus. The venue hosts student functions, academic speakers, and School of Music performances. It engages local secondary and primary schools through the performing arts. Commercially, it offers an annually updated program of artists, musicians, theatrical, and dance acts from around world. It houses two separate performance spaces, an auditorium and pavilion. The auditorium has a multi-winged, multi-leveled seating space for up to 1979 guests, and a 122' wide stage. The pavilion is a configurable space suitable for small scale events and performances with a maximum capacity of 200. The back lawn forms a natural amphitheater and has been used on occasion for outdoor performances.

== History ==
The Lied Center of Kansas opened on Sept. 28, 1993 and was built through the Lied Foundation Trust and the Lawrence, Kansas community. It was dedicated to Ernst F. Lied's parents, Ernst M. and Ida K. Lied. The inaugural show was a performance of The Secret Garden.

In its 21st season (2014–15), it inaugurated the IMPACT Award to honor one artist or group per season for distinguished service to the performing arts. It has partnered with the Lawrence School District (USD 497) in support of arts education for over 30 years. It honors one educator per season for distinguished service to arts education.
