= Papendiek =

Papendiek also Papendieck and at times Papendick is a surname. It may refer to:

- Charles Edward Ernest Papendiek (1801–1835), English architect of German descent
- Charlotte Papendiek née Albert (1765–1840), Lady-in-waiting of Charlotte of Mecklenburg-Strelitz consort of King George III of Great Britain
- George Ernest Papendiek (1788–1835), British watercolourist, painter and ambassador of German descent
