= American Smooth (poetry collection) =

Book by Rita Dove

- First edition
- Author: Rita Dove
- Language: English
- Genre: Poetry
- Publisher: W.W. Norton
- Publication date: 2004
- Publication place: United States
- Media type: Print
- Pages: 143 pp.
- ISBN: 978-0-393-05987-8
- OCLC: 55488060
- Dewey Decimal: 811/.54 22
- LC Class: PS3554.O884 A77 2004
- Preceded by: On the Bus with Rosa Parks
- Followed by: Sonata Mulattica

American Smooth is a poetry book by Rita Dove.

== Contents ==
- All souls
- "I have been a stranger in a strange land"
- Fox trot Fridays
- Ta ta cha cha
- Quick
- Brown
- Fox
- Heart to heart
- Cozy apologia
- Soprano
- Two for the Montrose drive-in
- Meditation at fifty yards, moving target
- American smooth
- The castle walk
- The passage
- Noble sissle's horn
- Alfonzo prepares to go over the top
- La Chapelle. 92nd Division. Ted
- Variation on reclamation
- The return of Lieutenant James Reese Europe
- Ripont
- Chocolate
- Bolero
- Hattie McDaniel arrives at the coconut grove
- Samba summer
- Blues in half-tones, 3/4 time
- Describe yourself in three words or less
- The seven veils of Salomé
- From your valentine
- Rhumba
- The sisters: swansong.
- Evening primrose
- Reverie in open air
- Sic itur ad astra
- Count to ten and we'll be there
- Eliza, age 10, Harlem
- Lullaby
- Driving through
- Desert backyard
- Desk dreams
- Now
- Against flight
- Looking up from the page, I am reminded of this mortal coil.

== Reviews ==
- Edward Byrne (2004–2005). "RITA DOVE: AMERICAN SMOOTH". Valparaiso Review.
- Emily Nussbaum (November 21, 2004). "American Smooth: Dance Fever". The New York Times.
