= Thomas and Beulah =

1986 poetry collection

- Author: Rita Dove
- Cover artist: Ray A. Dove
- Language: English
- Genre: Poetry
- Publisher: Carnegie Mellon University Press
- Publication date: 1986
- Publication place: United States
- Media type: Print
- Pages: 80 pp.
- ISBN: 0-88748-021-7 (Paperback)
- OCLC: 24955131
- Dewey Decimal: 811/.54 20
- LC Class: PS3554.O884 T47 1986
- Preceded by: Fifth Sunday
- Followed by: Grace Notes

Thomas and Beulah is a book of poems by American poet Rita Dove that tells the semi-fictionalized chronological story of her maternal grandparents during the Great Migration, the focus being on her grandfather (Thomas, his name in the book as well as in real life) in the first half and her grandmother (named Beulah in the book, although her real name was Georgianna) in the second. It won the 1987 Pulitzer Prize for poetry, making Dove the second African American to win the award after Gwendolyn Brooks won in 1950.

== Contents ==
=== I. Mandolin ===
- The Event (Note: Also featured in a chapbook titled Mandolin in Ohio Review, 28)
- Variation on Pain
- Jiving
- Straw Hat (Note: Also featured in Callaloo.)
- Courtship
- Refrain
- Variation on Guilt
- Nothing Down (Note: Also featured in The Reaper.)
- The Zeppelin Factory
- Under the Viaduct, 1932
- Lightnin' Blues (Note: Also featured in Paris Review.)
- Compendium
- Definition in the Face of Unnamed Fury
- Aircraft (Note: Also featured in CutBank.)
- Aurora Borealis
- Variation on Gaining a Son
- One Volume Missing
- The Charm
- Gospel (Note: Also featured in Georgia Review.)
- Roast Possum
- The Stroke
- The Satisfaction Coal Company
- Thomas at the Wheel

=== II. Canary in Bloom ===
- Taking in Wash (Note: Also featured in Ploughshares.)
- Magic (Note: Also shared in Nimrod International Journal of Poetry & Prose)
- Courtship, Diligence (Note: Also featured in New England Review and Bread Loaf Quarterly.)
- Promises
- Dusting (Note: Also featured in New American Poets of the Eighties, Wampeter Press, 1984) (Note: Also featured in Poetry.) (Note: Also featured in Pushcart Prize: VII, Pushcart Press, 1984, Museum, Carnegie-Mellon University Press, 1983, and The Morrow Anthology of Younger American Poets, 1985.)
- A Hill of Beans (Note: Also featured in The Bread Loaf Anthology of Contemporary American Poetry, University Press of New England, 1985)
- Weathering Out (Note: Also featured in Agni Review.)
- Motherhood
- Anniversary
- The House on Bishop Street
- Daystar
- Obedience
- The Great Palaces of Versailles
- Pomade
- Headdress
- Sunday Greens
- Recovery
- Nightmare
- Wingfoot Lake
- Company
- The Oriental Ballerina

== Critics ==
Malin Pereira has argued that one of the central functions of Thomas and Beulah is to redefine what "home" means in a cosmopolitan context, such as the kind in which many African Americans found themselves after the Great Migration.
