= Malin Pereira =

American literary scholar

- Born: 1961 (age 64–65) (Note: Stated in her authority record via the Bibliothèque nationale de France.)
- Citizenship: American
- Known for: Scholarship on Rita Dove and contemporary African American poetry, founding dean of the UNC Charlotte Honors College
- Title: Professor of English and Dean of the Honors College, University of North Carolina at Charlotte

Academic background
- Education: University of Wisconsin–Madison (BA, MA, PhD)
- Thesis: (1992)

Academic work
- Discipline: English studies
- Sub-discipline: African-American literature; American poetry
- Institutions: University of North Carolina at Charlotte (1992–present)
- Main interests: Contemporary African American poetry; Rita Dove; cosmopolitanism in African American poetics; mixed-race studies

Malin Pereira (Note: Her early published work appear under the names "Malin Lavon Walther" and "Malin Walther Pereira") is an American literary scholar, author and academic. Pereira is Professor of English at the University of North Carolina at Charlotte and serves as the founding Dean of the university's Honors College, a position she has held since 2022.

Pereira is known for her work on contemporary African American poetry, especially the work of Rita Dove, on whom she wrote the first book-length critical study by an American scholar, Rita Dove's Cosmopolitanism (2003). She also edited Into a Light Both Brilliant and Unseen: Conversations with Contemporary Black Poets (2010), a collection of interviews with eight post–Black Arts Movement poets, and wrote Embodying Beauty: Twentieth-Century American Women Writers' Aesthetics (2000).

== Early life and education ==
Pereira earned a Bachelor of Arts in English and psychology with distinction from the University of Wisconsin–Madison in 1984, with a minor in African American Studies. She remained at Wisconsin for a master's degree and a doctorate in English, and got a PhD in 1992 with a minor in Afro-American Studies.

Her early published work, including the monograph Embodying Beauty (2000) and journal articles in Twentieth Century Literature (1996) and MELUS (1997), appear under the names "Malin Lavon Walther" and "Malin Walther Pereira"; she has published as Malin Pereira since the late 1990s.

== Career ==
Pereira joined the University of North Carolina at Charlotte in 1992 as an Assistant Professor of English. She was promoted to Associate Professor in 1998 and to the rank of Professor in 2007. She has been an affiliate faculty member of the Department of Africana Studies since 1992 and an adjunct faculty member of the Women's and Gender Studies Program since 2009.

Within the English department she served as undergraduate coordinator from 1999 to 2003 and as department chair from 2007 to 2012. She also served as interim chair of the Department of Africana Studies from 2006 to 2007.

In August 2012 Pereira was appointed executive director of the UNC Charlotte Honors College, an institution established in 2003 to consolidate the university's honors programming. During her decade as executive director, undergraduate honors enrollment doubled, and the share of Black and biracial honors students grew by 152 percent. Three full-tuition merit scholarship programs (the Albert, Crown, and Martin Scholars) were established in this period, alongside the Johnson and Freeman tuition-and-fees scholarships, contributing about $600,000 in additional annual scholarship awards to honors students.

In 2022 the Honors College was reorganized as an official college, and Pereira was appointed its founding dean. Provost Joan F. Lorden, in announcing the appointment, said the college "has thrived under Dr. Pereira's leadership."

== Work ==
Pereira specializes in African American and American literature. Her work centers on contemporary Black poetry, aesthetics, cosmopolitanism, and mixed-race identity. She has written on Rita Dove, Thylias Moss, Brenda Marie Osbey, Natasha Trethewey, and Wanda Coleman.

Her first monograph, Embodying Beauty: Twentieth-Century American Women Writers' Aesthetics (Garland, 2000; reissued by Routledge), pairs six American writers across three generations: H.D. with Zora Neale Hurston, Gwendolyn Brooks with Sylvia Plath, and Toni Morrison with Louise Glück. Pereira argues that depictions of female beauty mirror the aesthetic ideologies of each period.

Rita Dove's Cosmopolitanism (University of Illinois Press, 2003) was the first book-length critical study of Dove's full output by an American scholar, covering her poetry, fiction, drama, and literary criticism. An appendix reprints a 1998 interview with Dove on the Black Arts Movement, her two terms as United States Poet Laureate, and H.D.'s influence on her work. Choice rated the book "Highly Recommended" in 2004. Pereira had conducted an earlier interview with Dove for Contemporary Literature in 1999.

Her edited volume Into a Light Both Brilliant and Unseen: Conversations with Contemporary Black Poets (University of Georgia Press, 2010) collects eight interviews that Pereira conducted with the poets: Wanda Coleman, Yusef Komunyakaa, Rita Dove, Harryette Mullen, Thylias Moss, Cornelius Eady, Cyrus Cassells, and Elizabeth Alexander. Pereira's introduction frames the contributors as a post-Black Arts Movement cohort. They reject fixed Black aesthetics and pursue plural approaches to race and poetic form.

Pereira received a National Endowment for the Humanities Summer Research Fellowship in 2000.

== Selected publications ==
Books

- Walther, Malin Lavon. Embodying Beauty: Twentieth-Century American Women Writers' Aesthetics. New York: Garland, 2000. Reissued by Routledge.
- Pereira, Malin. Rita Dove's Cosmopolitanism. Urbana: University of Illinois Press, 2003. ISBN 978-0-252-02837-3.
- Pereira, Malin (ed.). Into a Light Both Brilliant and Unseen: Conversations with Contemporary Black Poets. Athens: University of Georgia Press, 2010. ISBN 978-0-8203-3713-5.

Book chapters

- Walther, Malin LaVon. "Toni Morrison's Tar Baby: Re-Figuring the Colonizer's Aesthetics." In Cross-Cultural Performances: Differences in Women's Re-Visions of Shakespeare, edited by Marianne Novy, 137–149. Urbana: University of Illinois Press, 1993.
- Pereira, Malin. "Oprah's Book Club and the American Dream." In The Oprah Phenomenon, edited by Jennifer Harris and Elwood Watson, 191–205. Lexington: University Press of Kentucky, 2007.
- Pereira, Malin. "Brenda Marie Osbey's Black Internationalism." In Diasporas, Cultures of Mobilities, 'Race' 3: African Americans, 'Race' and Diaspora, 179–208. Montpellier: Presses universitaires de la Méditerranée, 2015.
- Pereira, Malin. "An Angry, Mixed Race Cosmopolitanism: Race, Privilege, Poetic Identity, and Community in Natasha Trethewey's Beyond Katrina and Thrall." In New Cosmopolitanisms, Race, and Ethnicity: Cultural Perspectives, edited by Ewa Barbara Łuczak, Anna Pochmara, and Samir Dayal, 254–274. Berlin: De Gruyter, 2019.
- Pereira, Malin. "Thylias Moss's Slave Moth: Liberatory Verse Narrative and Performance Art." In Slavery and the Post-Black Imagination, edited by Bertram D. Ashe and Ilka Saal, 160–181. Seattle: University of Washington Press, 2020.
- Pereira, Malin. "'Disobedient Ekphrasis' in the Poetry of Natasha Trethewey and Claudia Rankine." In Writing Borders and Other Barriers in the Era of Climate Crisis: Communities of Engagement, edited by Alan Rice, Olga Michael, Ludmila Martanovschi, and Katerina Antoniou. London: Bloomsbury, 2025.
- Pereira, Malin. “A Black Cosmopolitan Poetics” Cambridge History of African American Poetry. Ed. Keith Leonard. London: Cambridge UP, 2026.

Journal articles

- Walther, Malin LaVon. "Transforming the Monomyth: The Female Quest for Self in The Color Purple." University of Mississippi Studies in English, n.s., 7 (1989): 239–242.
- Walther, Malin LaVon. "Out of Sight: Toni Morrison's Revision of Beauty." Black American Literature Forum 24, no. 4 (1990): 775–789.
- Walther, Malin LaVon. "'And All the Interests Are Vested': Canon-Building in Recent Morrison Criticism." Modern Fiction Studies 39, nos. 3–4 (1993): 781–794.
- Walther, Malin LaVon. "Re-Wrighting Native Son: Gwendolyn Brooks' Domestic Aesthetic in Maud Martha." Tulsa Studies in Women's Literature 13, no. 1 (1994): 143–145.
- Walther Pereira, Malin. "Be(e)ing and 'Truth': Tar Baby's Signifying on Sylvia Plath's Bee Poems." Twentieth Century Literature 42 (1996): 526–534.
- Walther Pereira, Malin. "Periodizing Toni Morrison's Work from The Bluest Eye to Jazz: The Importance of Tar Baby." MELUS 22, no. 3 (1997): 71–82.
- Pereira, Malin, and Rita Dove. "An Interview with Rita Dove." Contemporary Literature 40, no. 2 (1999): 183–213.
- Pereira, Malin. "'When the Pear Blossoms/Cast Their Pale Faces on/the Darker Face of the Earth': Miscegenation, the Primal Scene, and the Incest Motif in Rita Dove's Work." African American Review 36, no. 2 (2002): 195–211.
- Pereira, Malin, and Cyrus Cassells. "An Interview with Cyrus Cassells." Contemporary Literature 44, no. 3 (2003): 381–398.
- Pereira, Malin. "'The Poet in the World, the World in the Poet': Cyrus Cassells's and Elizabeth Alexander's Versions of Post-Soul Cosmopolitanism." African American Review 41, no. 4 (2007): 709–725.
- Pereira, Malin. "Sister Seer and Scribe: Teaching Wanda Coleman's and Elizabeth Alexander's Poetic Responses to Sylvia Plath." Plath Profiles 1 (2008): 280–290.
- Pereira, Malin. "Re-Reading Trethewey through Mixed Race Studies." The Southern Quarterly 50, no. 4 (2013): 123–152.
- Pereira, Malin. "A Seat at the Front of the Bus of American Poetry: Wanda Coleman's 'Retro Rogue Anthology' in Mercurochrome." Hecate 40, no. 1 (2014): 97–115.
