= On the Bus with Rosa Parks =

1999 book of poems by Rita Dove

- Author: Rita Dove
- Language: English
- Genre: Poetry
- Publisher: Norton
- Publication date: 1999
- Publication place: United States
- Media type: Print
- Pages: 95 pp.
- ISBN: 978-0-393-04722-6
- OCLC: 39905945
- Dewey Decimal: 811/.54 21
- LC Class: PS3554.O884 O52 1999
- Preceded by: Mother Love
- Followed by: American Smooth

On the Bus with Rosa Parks is a book of poems by Rita Dove. Rosa Parks was an American activist in the civil rights movement best known for her pivotal role in the Montgomery bus boycott. The United States Congress has called her "the first lady of civil rights" and "the mother of the freedom movement".

The book contains a poem about Claudette Colvin, a high school student who was arrested in Montgomery, Alabama, nine months before Parks for refusing to give up her seat on a city bus.

== Contents ==
- July, 1925
- Night
- Birth
- Lake Erie skyline, 1930
- Depression years
- Homework
- Graduation, grammar school
- Painting the town
- Easter Sunday, 1940
- Nightwatch. The son
- Singsong
- I cut my finger once on purpose
- Parlor
- The first book
- Maple Valley Branch Library, 1967
- Freedom: bird's-eye view
- Testimonial
- Dawn revisited
- My mother enters the work force
- Black on a Saturday night
- The musician talks about "process"
- Sunday
- The camel comes to us from the barbarians
- The Venus of Willendorf
- Incarnation in Phoenix
- Best Western Motor Lodge, AAA approved
- Revenant
- On Veronica
- There came a soul
- The peach orchard
- Against repose Against self-pity
- Götterdämmerung
- Ghost walk
- Lady Freedom among us
- For Sophie, who'll be in first grade in the year 2000
- Sit back, relax
- "The situation is intolerable"
- Freedom ride
- Climbing in
- Claudette Colvin goes to work
- The enactment
- Rosa
- QE2. Transatlantic crossing. Third Day.
- In the lobby of the Warner Theatre, Washington, D.C.
- The pond, porch-view: six P.M., early spring.
