= Charlotte Papendiek =

British lady-in-waiting (1765–1840)

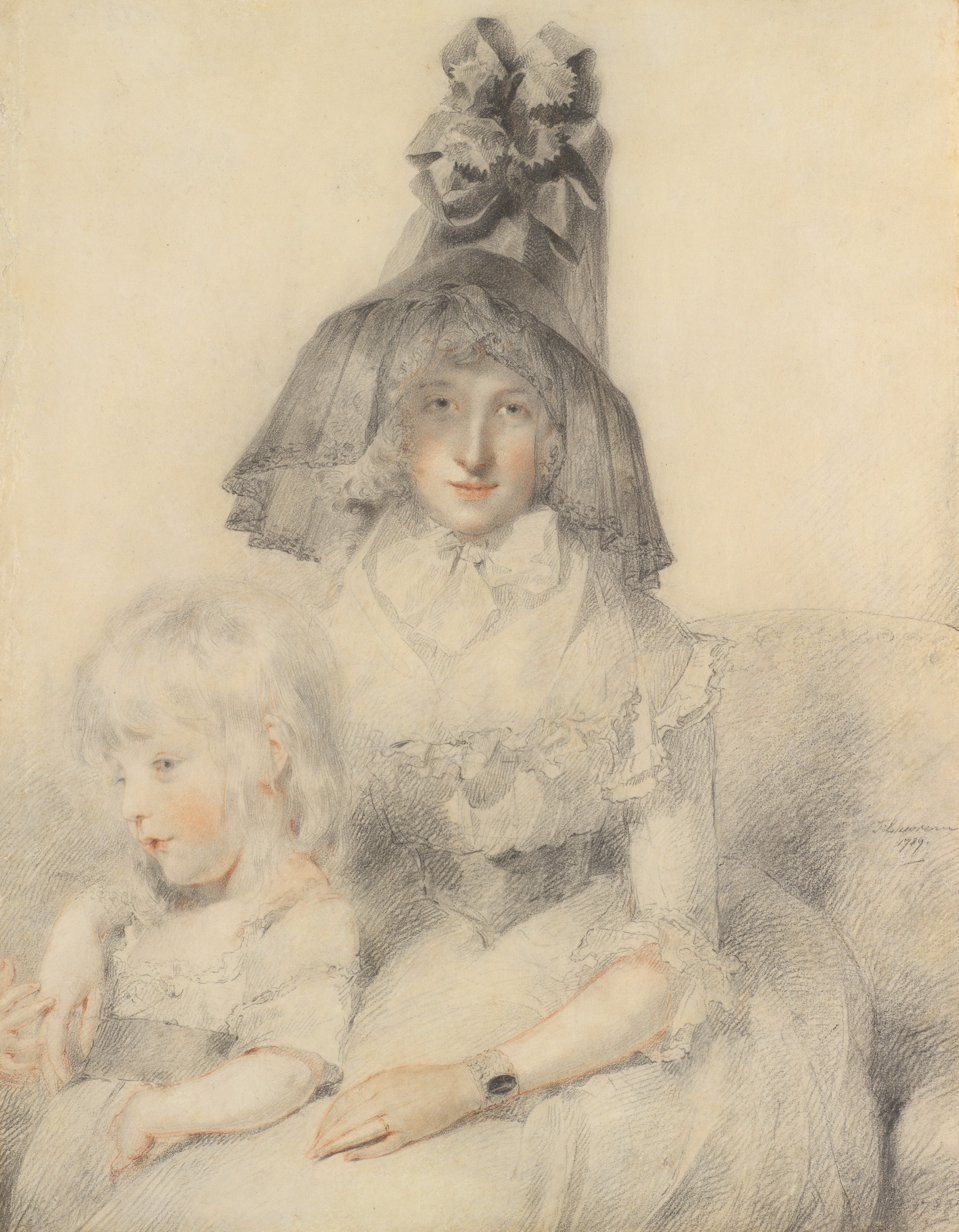
Charlotte Papendiek with her eldest son Frederick – a drawing by Thomas Lawrence, 1789, Metropolitan Museum of Art

Charlotte Louise Henriette Papendiek (née Albert; 2 July 1765, London – 24 April 1840, Windsor) was a lady-in-waiting to the British queen Charlotte of Mecklenburg-Strelitz.

== Life ==
Charlotte was the daughter of Friedrich Albert (born 28 January 1733, Frankfurt am Main), who in 1755 had entered the service of Adolphus Frederick IV, Duke of Mecklenburg-Strelitz. When Adolphus Frederick's 17-year-old sister Charlotte married George III in 1761, Friedrich Albert followed her to Britain as a page, barber and hairdresser. Friedrich's daughter Charlotte married Christopher Papendiek, a violinist, flautist and court musician to George III, on 16 January 1783 in St George's Hanover Square. They had six children, including the diplomat and painter George Ernest Papendiek (1788–1835) and the architect Charles Edward Ernest Papendiek (1801–1835).

On 16 October 1794, she became Assistant Keeper of the Queen's Wardrobe and she later also became Queen Charlotte's reader.

== Memoirs ==
In 1833, Charlotte Papendiek began to write an extensive set of memoirs – they remained unfinished and were published by her granddaughter in 1887. Alongside the diaries of Fanny Burney, another lady-in-waiting, they are a major source on family and artistic life within the British court at that time. They also contain much information on musicians active in London at this time, such as Johann Christian Bach, George Bridgetower, Muzio Clementi, Joseph Haydn and Johann Peter Salomon, and were used as such by Rita Dove for her Sonata Mulattica on Bridgetower's life.

== Works ==
- Court and Private Life in the Time of Queen Charlotte: Being the Journals of Mrs Papendiek, Assistant Keeper of the Wardrobe and Reader to Her Majesty, edited by her Grand-Daughter, Mrs Vernon Delves Broughton, 2 volumes, London: Richard Bentley & Son, 1887
  - Vol 1 (Digitised version)
  - Vol 2 (Digitised version)
- Michael Kassler (ed.), The Memoirs of Charlotte Papendiek (1765–1840), London: Pickering & Chatto, 2015
