= Association of Writers & Writing Programs =

Nonprofit literary organization

- Formation: 1967
- Type: Professional/Academic literary organization
- Location: Norfolk, Virginia, U.S.
- Executive Director: Michelle Aielli
- Website: www.awpwriter.org

The Association of Writers & Writing Programs (AWP) is a nonprofit literary organization that provides support, advocacy, resources, and community to writers, college and university creative writing programs, and writers’ conferences and centers. It was founded in 1967 by R. V. Cassill and cofounders Kay Cassill, Stanton Garner, Edwin Honig, and David Krause.

== History ==
The Associated Writing Programs was established as a nonprofit organization in 1967 by fifteen writers representing thirteen creative writing programs. The new association sought to support the growing presence of literary writers in higher education. At that time, English departments were mainly conservatories of the great literature of the past, and scholars fiercely resisted the establishment of creative writing programs. AWP was created to overcome this resistance, to advocate for new programs, and to provide publishing opportunities for young writers. Today, AWP, now the Association of Writers & Writing Programs, supports colleges and universities as well as writing organizations and individual writers as members.

To this day, AWP continues to expand, offering new programs and services to support its members. AWP has also supported the development of hundreds of educational programs, conferences, reading series, and literary magazines, as well as thousands of jobs for writers and new audiences for contemporary literature.

== AWP Conference & Bookfair ==
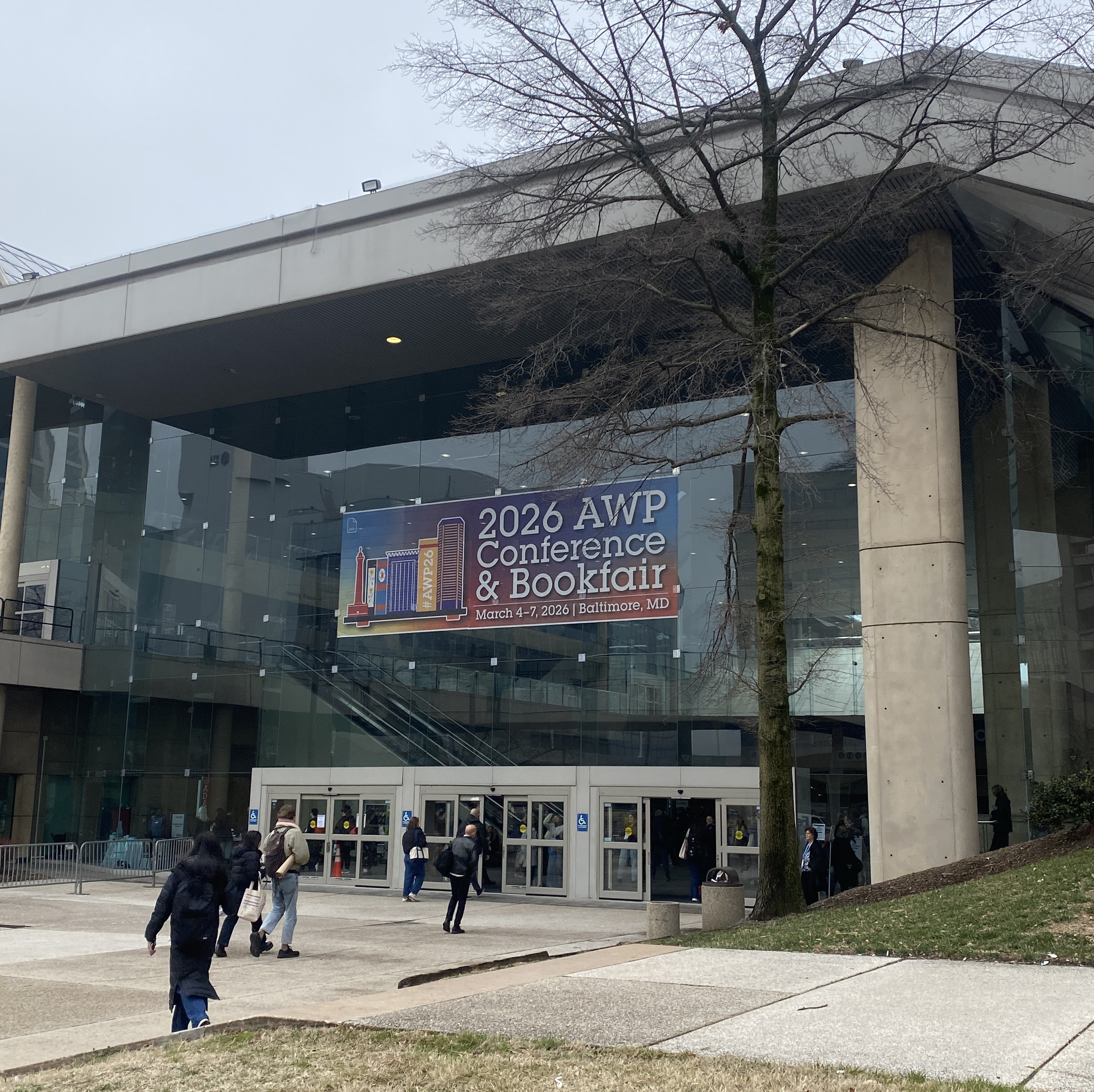
2026 AWP Conference in Baltimore, Maryland

The AWP Conference & Bookfair is a large and inclusive literary conference in North America. AWP hosts an annual conference in a different region of North America, featuring presentations, readings, lectures, panel discussions, book signings, receptions, and a large bookfair. The conference is held in the late winter or early spring of each year, and attracts thousands of attendees and bookfair exhibitors.

AWP enters into partnerships with allied literary organizations like the Academy of American Poets, the Authors Guild, Cave Canem Foundation, the Center for Fiction, Community of Literary Magazines & Presses, Kundiman, National Book Critics Circle, Poetry Society of America, and Writers in the Schools to serve the association’s various constituencies and to provide programming at the conference. Two or three featured events, including the keynote address, are created by the Conference Steering Committee of the AWP Board of Trustees.

=== Conference history ===
AWP's first conference was held in 1973 at the Library of Congress, and it hosted six events and 16 presenters. George Garrett, one of AWP’s first presidents, planned the first gathering with help from the National Endowment for the Arts. Presenters included Elliott Coleman, founder of the Writing Seminars at Johns Hopkins University; Paul Engle, founder of the Iowa Writers’ Workshop; poets Josephine Jacobsen and Miller Williams; and novelists Ralph Ellison and Wallace Stegner, among others.

The AWP Conference & Bookfair has shown significant growth since the early 2000s, transforming from a small conference of only a couple thousand attendees, 300 exhibitors, and fewer than 200 events to over 12,000 attendees, 800 exhibitors, and 550 events today.

The 2023 conference, held in Seattle, had over 9,000 attendees and 563 on-site exhibitors at the bookfair.

Every year, conference presenters include winners of literary prizes, including the Man Booker Prize, the National Book Award, the National Book Critics Circle Award, the Nobel Prize, and the Pulitzer Prize, as well a MacArthur and Guggenheim fellows. Past lectures and readings have featured Chimamanda Ngozi Adichie, Margaret Atwood, Anne Carson, Michael Chabon, Sandra Cisneros, Don DeLillo, Rita Dove, Jennifer Egan, Louise Erdrich, Nikki Giovanni, Terrance Hayes, Seamus Heaney, John Irving, Ha Jin, Erik Larson, Carolyn Forché, Roxane Gay, Ursula K. Le Guin, Jonathan Lethem, Barry Lopez, Jhumpa Lahiri, Chang-rae Lee, Alice McDermott, Joyce Carol Oates, Sharon Olds, Robert Pinsky, Annie Proulx, Claudia Rankine, Marilynne Robinson, Karen Russell, Richard Russo, Cheryl Strayed, Amy Tan, Natasha Trethewey, Derek Walcott, Colson Whitehead, Jeanette Winterson, and Tobias Wolff.

Past and future conferences
#	Year	City	State/Province	Country
1	1973	Washington	District of Columbia	United States
-	1974-1977	Hiatus		
2	1978	San Francisco	California	United States
3	1979	Nashville	Tennessee	United States
4	1980	San Antonio	Texas	United States
5	1981	Seattle	Washington	United States
6	1982	Boston	Massachusetts	United States
7	1983	St. Louis	Missouri	United States
8	1984	Savannah	Georgia	United States
9	1985	San Diego	California	United States
10	1986	Chicago	Illinois	United States
11	1987	Austin	Texas	United States
12	1988	San Francisco	California	United States
13	1989	Philadelphia	Pennsylvania	United States
14	1990	Denver	Colorado	United States
15	1991	Miami	Florida	United States
16	1992	Minneapolis	Minnesota	United States
17	1993	Norfolk	Virginia	United States
18	1994	Tempe	Arizona	United States
19	1995	Pittsburgh	Pennsylvania	United States
20	1996	Atlanta	Georgia	United States
21	1997	Washington	District of Columbia	United States
22	1998	Portland	Oregon	United States
23	1999	Albany	New York	United States
24	2000	Kansas City	Missouri	United States
25	2001	Palm Springs	California	United States
26	2002	New Orleans	Louisiana	United States
27	2003	Baltimore	Maryland	United States
28	2004	Chicago	Illinois	United States
29	2005	Vancouver	British Columbia	Canada
30	2006	Austin	Texas	United States
31	2007	Atlanta	Georgia	United States
32	2008	New York City	New York	United States
33	2009	Chicago	Illinois	United States
34	2010	Denver	Colorado	United States
35	2011	Washington	District of Columbia	United States
36	2012	Chicago	Illinois	United States
37	2013	Boston	Massachusetts	United States
38	2014	Seattle	Washington	United States
39	2015	Minneapolis	Minnesota	United States
40	2016	Los Angeles	California	United States
41	2017	Washington	District of Columbia	United States
42	2018	Tampa	Florida	United States
43	2019	Portland	Oregon	United States
44	2020	San Antonio	Texas	United States
45	2021	Virtual (due to COVID-19 pandemic)		
46	2022	Philadelphia	Pennsylvania	United States
47	2023	Seattle	Washington	United States
48	2024	Kansas City	Missouri	United States
49	2025	Los Angeles	California	United States
50	2026	Baltimore	Maryland	United States
51	2027	Chicago	Illinois	United States

== Magazine ==
The Writer's Chronicle
- Frequency: 6 Issues per Year
- Circulation: 40,000
- Publisher: AWP
- Founded: 1967
- Country: United States
- Language: English

The Writer’s Chronicle is a source of articles, news, and information for writers, editors, students, and teachers of writing. Published six times a year, each issue features essays on the craft of writing, as well as interviews with authors.

== Awards sponsored ==
AWP sponsors six contests and also provides an extensive listing of literary grants, awards, and publication opportunities available from organizations and publishers throughout North America. Their contests include the AWP Award Series, the George Garrett Award for Outstanding Community Service in Literature, the Small Press Publisher Award, the Writing Organization Award, the Intro Journals Project, and the Prize for Undergrad Lit Mags (formerly the National Program Directors’ Prize).

=== AWP Award Series ===
Annual contests are held in four categories, with the winner receiving a cash honorarium and publication of their book-length collection.

==== Sue William Silverman Prize for Creative Nonfiction ====
Named for author Sue William Silverman, the prize is awarded to a book-length collection of creative nonfiction, with publication through the University of Georgia Press.

==== James Alan McPherson Prize for the Novel ====
Formerly named the AWP Prize for the Novel, the prize was renamed for author James Alan McPherson in 2023. The prize is awarded to a novel, with publication through the University of Nebraska Press. Previous publishers of the award winners include New Issues Press.

==== Donald Hall Prize for Poetry ====
Named for poet Donald Hall, the prize is awarded to a book-length collection of poetry, with publication through the University of Pittsburgh Press.

==== Grace Paley Prize for Short Fiction ====
The Grace Paley Prize is an American literary award presented by the Association of Writers & Writing Programs. The award carries a prize of $5,000 and a publishing contract with Mad Creek Books, an imprint of the Ohio State University Press.

== Controversies ==
Vanessa Place was removed from the 2016 Los Angeles Subcommittee to satisfy concerns of the AWP membership after Place received criticism for a Twitter art project where she retyped the entire text from the 1936 novel Gone with the Wind in an effort to call attention to the novel's inherent racism. While some have argued the Twitter account was meant to scrutinize and call attention to stereotyping and racism in Gone with the Wind, others accused it of being racist or insensitive itself, which resulted in not only the removal of Place from the subcommittee, but also a number of other literary organizations canceling appearances by Place.

In anticipation of the 2016 AWP Conference & Bookfair in Los Angeles, some members of the organization objected to what they felt was a lack of programming specific to literature and disabilities. A petition was started that claimed the subcommittee responsible for selecting the events rejected all proposals having to do with disability, while some sources responded this claim was erroneous. AWP implemented changes for the 2016 conference to further efforts to provide increased accommodations for disabled attendees, which included an on-site location where attendees could report accessibility issues, improved signage, and reserved seating throughout the conference, as well as updates to the accessibility services throughout the event.

For the 2017 AWP Conference & Bookfair in Washington, D.C., the number of proposals related to literature and disability increased, and the subcommittee accepted twenty of them for inclusion. At each conference, AWP provides many accessibility services, including ASL interpretation, cued speech transliteration, computer-assisted real-time captioning, assistive listening devices, braille programs, accommodations for those requiring an attendant or assistant, and much more to attendees who need these services.
