= Charles Edward Ernest Papendiek =

English architect (1801–1835)

Charles Edward Ernest Papendiek (1801–1835) was an English architect of German descent.

== Life ==
He was the youngest son of Christopher Papendiek and his wife Charlotte, respectively a court musician and a lady in waiting at the court of George III and Queen Charlotte. Charles studied under John Soane from 1818 to 1824, became an architect and in 1826 authored A Synopsis of Architecture, for the Information of the Student and Amateur.
