= George Ernest Papendiek =

German painter (1788–1835)

George Ernest Papendiek (22 July 1788, Windsor – 5 February 1835, Bremen) was a British watercolourist, painter and ambassador of German descent.

== Life ==
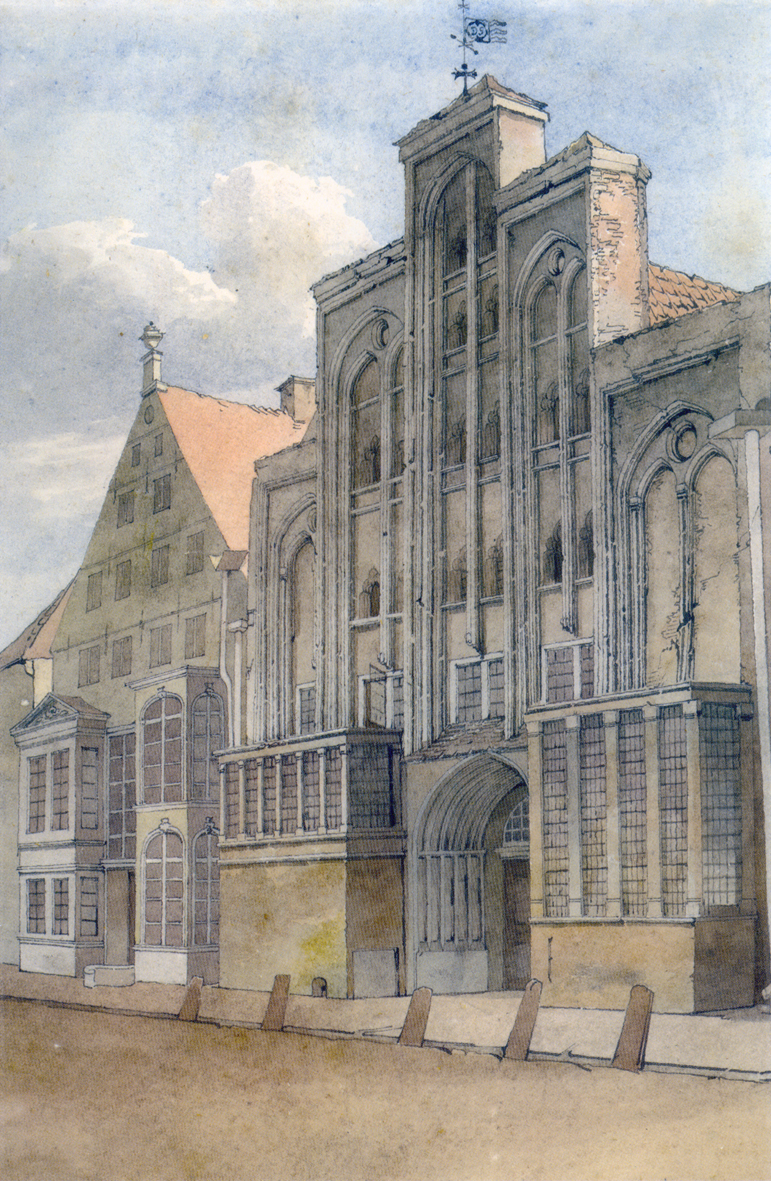
The Speckhansche Haus, a watercolour by G. E. Papendiek, Focke-Museum, Bremen.

Papendiek was the son of (John) Christopher Papendiek, a court-musician to George III of Great Britain, and his wife Charlotte, daughter of Friedrich Albert, a page and barber who had come to Britain as part of Charlotte of Mecklenburg-Strelitz's retinue on her marriage to George III in 1761. In 1798 or 1799, George Ernest's mother also joined the court, as a lady-in-waiting to Queen Charlotte and subsequently became Assistant Keeper of the royal wardrobe and wrote her memoirs of life at Court.

Initially trained as a merchant, he arrived in Bremen in 1817 and soon painted his first views of the city. He returned there in 1821 and created a series of watercolours showing scenes in the city. In 1825 he was made British vice-consul and Hanoverian consul to Bremen (the United Kingdom was still in personal union with the Kingdom of Hanover, a status that lasted from 1714 until 1837). From 1817 to 1821, some of his works were published as lithographs under the title "Six sketches in Germany". In 1820, some of his watercolours of Kew Palace and Kew Gardens were engraved and published as "Kew Gardens: A Series of Twenty-Four Drawings on Stone".

== Bibliography ==
- Gustav Pauli: George Ernest Papendiek, Jahrbuch der bremischen Sammlungen 1910, S. 1 ff
- Herbert Schwarzwälder: Das Große Bremen-Lexikon. Edition Temmen, Bremen 2003, ISBN 3-86108-693-X.
- Michael Kassler (ed.): The Memoirs of Charlotte Papendiek (1765-1840), London, Pickering & Chatto, 2015
