= Sonata Mulattica =

2009 book by Rita Dove

Sonata Mulattica : A Life in Five Movements and a Short Play
- Author: Rita Dove
- Publisher: W. W. Norton
- Publication date: 2009
- ISBN: 978-0393338935

Sonata Mulattica : A Life in Five Movements and a Short Play is a collection of poems by U.S. poet laureate Rita Dove, published in 2009, about the life of George Bridgetower. Bridgetower was a biracial (Afro-Caribbean, Polish, German) musician who was friends with Beethoven. Beethoven's Kreutzer Sonata was originally dedicated to Bridgetower, and was originally entitled "Sonata mulattica composta per il mulatto Brischdauer [Bridgetower], gran pazzo e compositore mulattico" (Mulatto Sonata composed for the mulatto Brischdauer, big wild mulatto composer)

Dove said that she relied on documents such as the diary of Charlotte Papendiek, lady-in-waiting to the wife of George III, and whose husband Christopher Papendiek was one of the king's court musicians and helped to arrange concerts for Bridgetower. However, as not much information is available about Bridgetower's life, or details regarding the incident regarding the Sonata, Dove's work is mostly her own imagined version of events.

The book consists of five "movements", each a group of poems about a particular theme, as well as a short play.

== Critical reception ==
Publishers Weekly reviewed Sonata Mulattica as "a heterogeneous profusion of short poems, some almost prosy, some glittering in their technique" and "...those who loved her early work may think this book too long: few, though, will doubt the seriousness of her effort, her interest at once in the history of classical music and the changing meanings of race."

The New York Times quotes Africlassical.com creator William Zwick, who says: "Dove does a wonderful job of humanizing the story"

The New Yorker said: "[...] stuffed with historical and musical arcana. Yet the book remains highly accessible, reading much like a historical novel. Dove is fascinated by Bridgetower's life as a black musician and occasionally implies parallels with the world of jazz and rap, but the issue of race does not predominate. She is concerned equally with the status of musicians in a world of precarious patronage." The New Yorker also listed the work as part of their 2009 "A Year's Reading" list.

The Los Angeles Times called it a "masterful collection".

The American Library Association listed the work as part of their "Booklist Editor's Choice" for 2009, and described the work as "a mischievous and sensuous cycle of linked poems that explores genius and power, class and race."

Jillian Wilson, a poet and professor at Kent State University, says that Dove did particularly well with converting all of the history in this book and adding her own twist to it.

== Film ==
A documentary adaptation of Sonata Mulattica was announced in 2009, but the project was never produced and appears to have been abandoned.
