= Rita Dove =

American poet and author (born 1952)

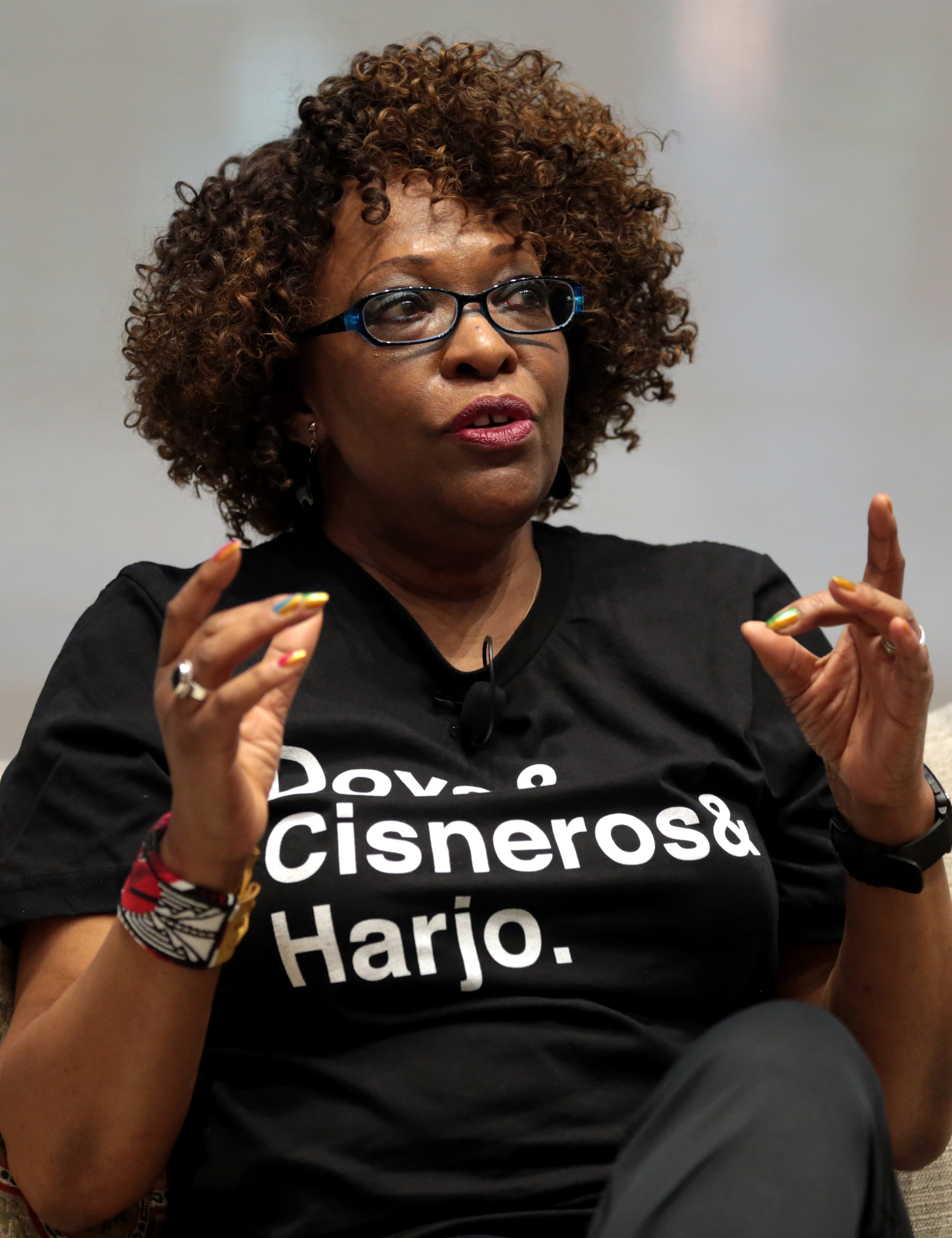
- Dove in December 2017
- Born: Rita Frances Dove; August 28, 1952 (age 74); Akron, Ohio, U.S.
- Education: Miami University (BA); University of Iowa (MFA)
- Occupations: Poet; author; university professor
- Spouse: Fred Viebahn (m. 1979)
- Children: 1
- Writing career
- Notable works: Thomas and Beulah; The Darker Face of the Earth; Sonata Mulattica; Playlist for the Apocalypse
- Notable awards: Pulitzer Prize for Poetry (1987); United States Poet Laureate (1993–95); Poet Laureate of Virginia (2004–06); 1996 National Humanities Medal; 2011 National Medal of Arts; 2019 Wallace Stevens Award; 2021 American Academy of Arts and Letters Gold Medal; 2022 Ruth Lilly Poetry Prize 2022 Bobbitt National Prize for Poetry; 2023 National Book Awards lifetime achievement medal for Distinguished Contribution to American Letters

Rita Frances Dove (born August 28, 1952) is an American poet and essayist. She served as poet laureate consultant in poetry to the Library of Congress from 1993 to 1995, becoming the first African American appointed to the position after it was established in 1986. (Note: The previous consultant in poetry position existed from 1937 to 1986. Robert Hayden had served as the first non-white consultant in poetry from 1976 to 1978.) In 1987, she became the second African American to receive the Pulitzer Prize for Poetry. Dove was special consultant in poetry to the Library of Congress during its bicentennial year (1999–2000) and served as Poet Laureate of Virginia from 2004 to 2006. She has been teaching at the University of Virginia since 1989.

== Early life ==
Rita Dove was born on August 28, 1952, in Akron, Ohio. Her father, Ray Dove, was one of the first African-American chemists to work in the U.S. tire industry as a research chemist at Goodyear, while her mother, Elvira Hord, achieved honors in high school and would share her passion for reading with her daughter.

Dove graduated from Buchtel High School in 1970 as a Presidential Scholar and received a Bachelor of Arts summa cum laude from Miami University in 1973. From 1974 to 1975, she held a Fulbright Scholarship at the University of Tübingen in Germany. She received her Master of Fine Arts from the Iowa Writers' Workshop at the University of Iowa in 1977.

== Career ==
External videos
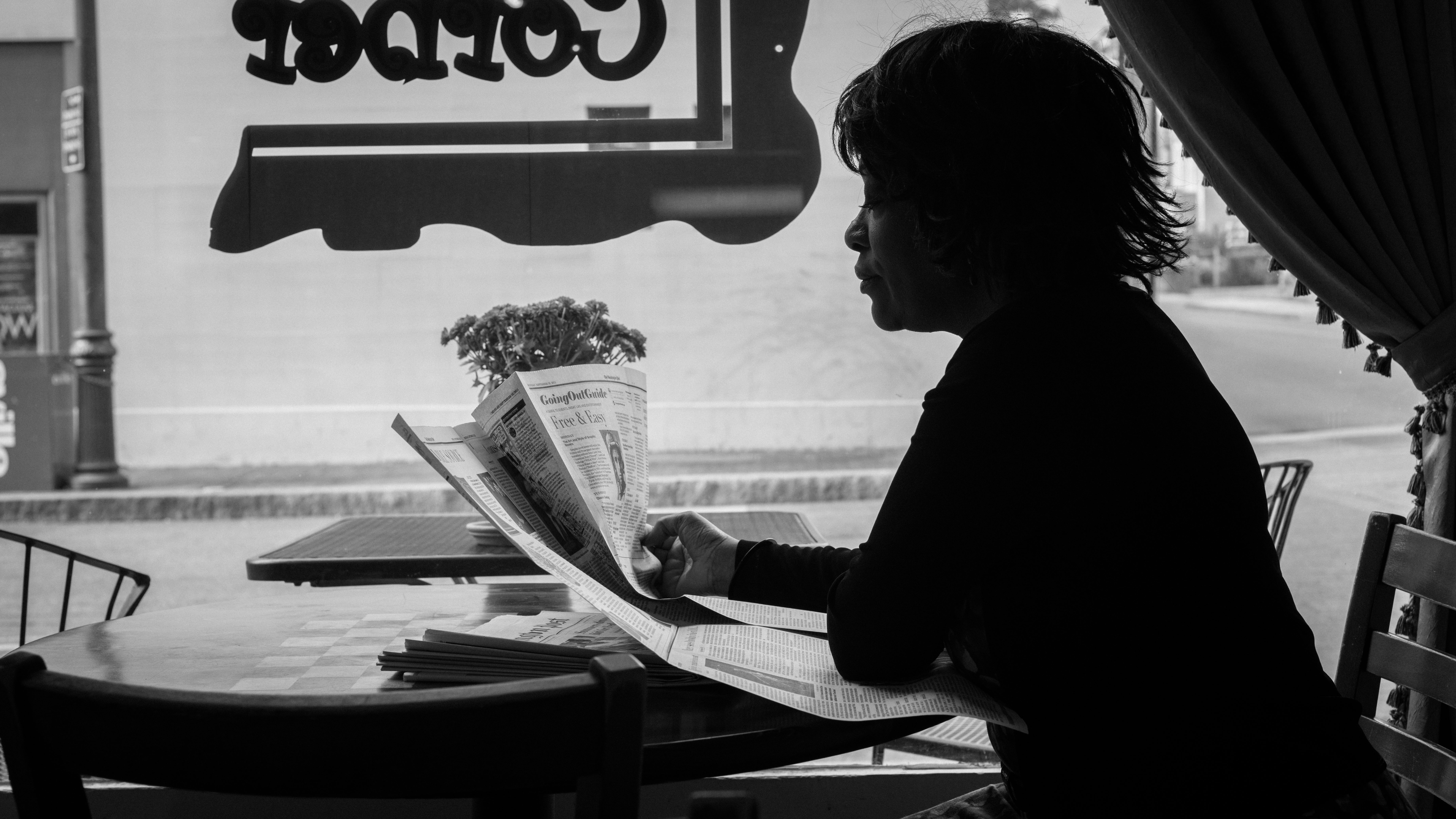
- C-SPAN Former U.S. Poet Laureate Rita Dove, 15:43, C-SPAN

Dove taught creative writing at Arizona State University from 1981 to 1989. She received the 1987 Pulitzer Prize for Poetry. In May 1993 she was named United States Poet Laureate by the Librarian of Congress, an office she held until 1995. At the age of 40, Dove was the youngest person in the position and the first African American since the title was changed to Poet Laureate (Robert Hayden had served as the first non-white Consultant in Poetry from 1976 to 1978, and Gwendolyn Brooks had been the last Consultant in Poetry in 1985–86). Early in her tenure as poet laureate, Dove was featured by Bill Moyers in a one-hour interview on his PBS prime-time program Bill Moyers Journal. Since 1989, she has been teaching at the University of Virginia in Charlottesville, where she held the chair of Commonwealth Professor of English from 1993 to 2020 and, since 2020, is the Henry Hoyns Professor of Creative Writing.

Dove also served as a special bicentennial consultant in poetry to the Library of Congress in 1999–2000, along with Louise Glück and W. S. Merwin. In 2004, then-governor Mark Warner appointed her to a two-year position as Poet Laureate of Virginia. In her public posts, Dove concentrated on spreading the word about poetry and increasing public awareness of the benefits of literature. As United States Poet Laureate, for example, she brought together writers to explore the African diaspora through the eyes of its artists.

Dove was on the board of the Associated Writing Programs (AWP) (now "Association of Writers and Writing Programs") from 1985 to 1988, leading the organization as its president from 1986 to 1987. From 1994 to 2000, she was a senator (member of the governing board) of the national academic honor society Phi Beta Kappa. From 2006 to 2012 she served as a chancellor of the Academy of American Poets. Since 1991, she has been on the jury of the annual Anisfield-Wolf Book Awards—from 1991 to 1996 together with Ashley Montagu and Henry Louis Gates; from 1997 to 2023 with Gates, Joyce Carol Oates, Simon Schama, Stephen Jay Gould (until his death in 2002) and Steven Pinker (who replaced Gould in 2002), and since 2023 with Pinker, Peter Ho Davies, Tiya Miles and Natasha Tretheway. Since 2023 she serves as vice president for literature at the American Academy of Arts and Letters.

In 2000 and 2001, Dove wrote a weekly column, "Poet's Choice", for The Washington Post. In the spring of 2018, Dove was named poetry editor of The New York Times Magazine. After writing nearly fifty columns in which she championed new American poetry, she resigned from the position in August 2019.

Dove's work cannot be confined to a specific era or school in contemporary literature; her wide-ranging topics and the precise poetic language with which she captures complex emotions defy easy categorization. Her most famous work to date is Thomas and Beulah, published by Carnegie-Mellon University Press in 1986, a collection of poems loosely based on the lives of her maternal grandparents, for which she received the Pulitzer Prize in 1987. Dove has published eleven volumes of poetry, a book of short stories (Fifth Sunday, 1985), a collection of essays (The Poet's World, 1995), and a novel, Through the Ivory Gate (1992). Her Collected Poems 1974–2004 was released by W. W. Norton in 2016; it carries an excerpt from President Barack Obama's 2011 National Medal of Arts commendation on its back cover.

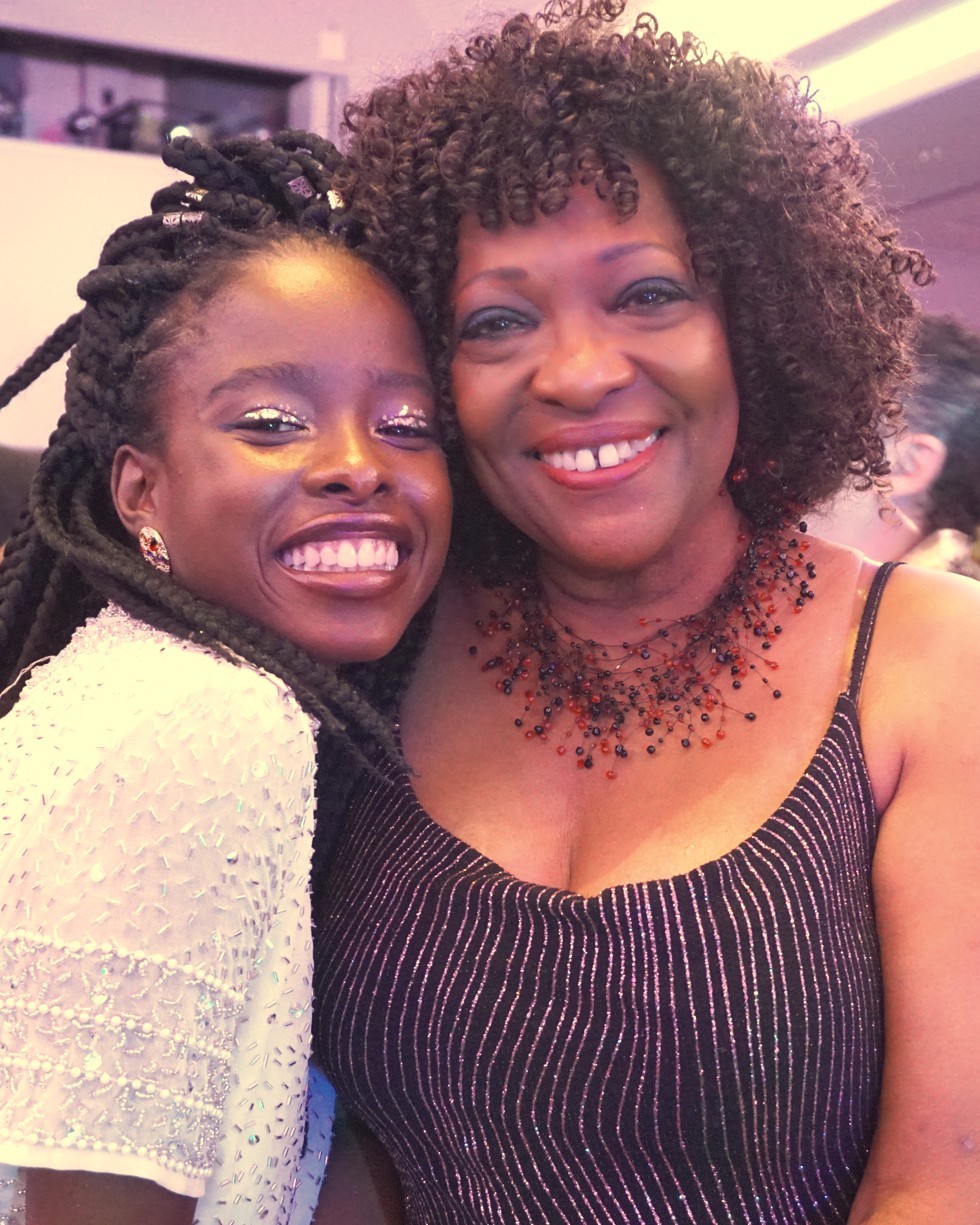
Dove and then-national youth poet laureate Amanda Gorman at the "Furious Flower" gala in Washington, D.C., September 27, 2019

In 1994, she published the play The Darker Face of the Earth (revised stage version 1996), which premiered at the Oregon Shakespeare Festival in Ashland, Oregon, in 1996 (first European production: Royal National Theatre, London, 1999). She collaborated with composer John Williams on the song cycle Seven for Luck (first performance: Boston Symphony, Tanglewood, 1998, conducted by the composer). For "America's Millennium", the White House's 1999/2000 New Year's celebration, Dove contributed — in a live reading at the Lincoln Memorial, accompanied by John Williams' music — a poem to Steven Spielberg's documentary The Unfinished Journey. She also provided the texts for Pulitzer Prize winner Tania Leon's musical works "Singin' Sepia" (1996), "Reflections" (2006) and "The Crossing Choir" (forthcoming), among other collaborations with multiple composers, most recently on "A Standing Witness" with Richard Danielpour.

Dove's most ambitious collection of poetry to date, Sonata Mulattica, was published in 2009; it received the 2010 Hurston/Wright Legacy Award. Over its more than 200 pages, it "has the sweep and vivid characters of a novel", as Mark Doty wrote in O, The Oprah Magazine.

Dove's 11th collection of poetry, Playlist for the Apocalypse, was published by W. W. Norton in August 2021. The New York Times critic Dwight Garner called it "among her best", "poems that are by turns delicate, witty and audacious."

Dove edited The Penguin Anthology of 20th-Century American Poetry, published in 2011. The collection provoked heated controversy as some critics complained that she valued an inclusive, populist agenda over quality. Poet John Olson commented that "her exclusions are breathtaking". Well-known poets left out include Sylvia Plath, Allen Ginsberg, Sterling Allen Brown, Louis Zukofsky, George Oppen, Charles Reznikoff and Lorine Niedecker.

As Dove explained in her foreword and in media interviews, she had originally selected works by Plath, Ginsberg and Brown but these as well as some other poets were omitted against her editorial wishes; their contributions had to be removed from print-ready copy at the very last minute because their publisher forbade their inclusion due to a disagreement with Penguin over permission fees. Critic Helen Vendler condemned Dove's choices, asking "why are we being asked to sample so many poets of little or no lasting value?" Dove defended her editorial work vigorously in her response to Vendler in The New York Review of Books, as well as in wide-ranging interviews with The Writer's Chronicle, with poet Jericho Brown on the Best American Poetry website, and with Bill Moyers on his public television show Moyers & Company. The Boston Review continued the discussion from different angles with an aggressive attack by scholar Marjorie Perloff and a spirited counter-attack by poet and scholar Evie Shockley, who took on both Vendler and Perloff.

Dove published a number of books in foreign translations, among them two into German, two into Chinese, three into Spanish, and one each into Norwegian, Macedonian, Italian, French, Dutch and Hebrew, plus numerous translations in foreign magazines. One of her earliest foreign translations was into French by Paol Keineg and published in the Breton review "Bretagnes" in 1976.

The annual "Rita Dove Poetry Award" was established by Salem College Center for Women Writers in 2004. The documentary film Rita Dove: An American Poet by Eduardo Montes-Bradley premiered at the Paramount Theater on January 31, 2014.

In 2019, on the occasion of the 200th anniversary of Walt Whitman's birth, Dove put the African-American poetic reception of Whitman into perspective at a poetry festival in Bogotá, Colombia, during a round-table session with Robert Pinsky.

== Awards and honors ==
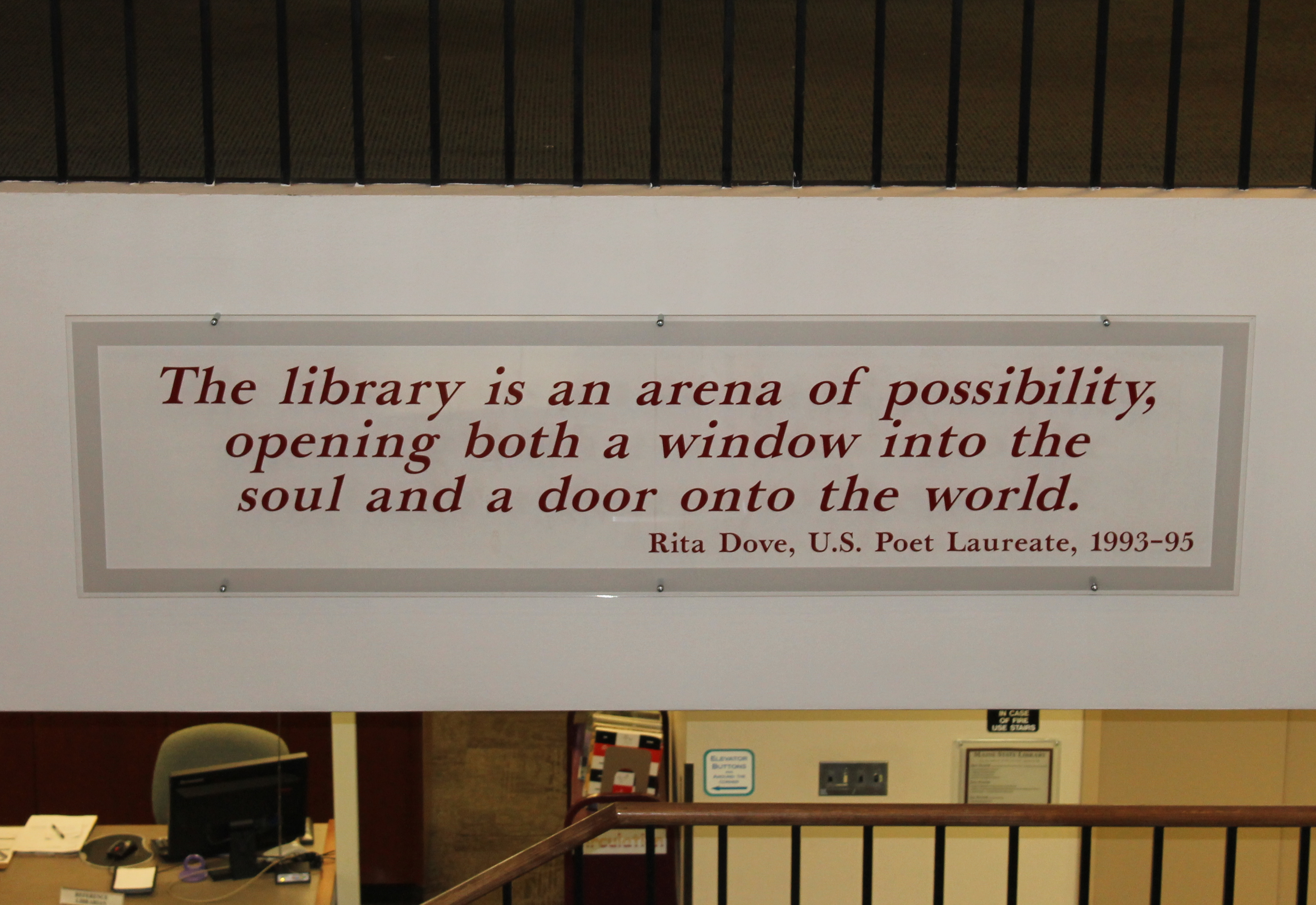
Poet Laureate Rita Dove's definition of a library at the entrance to the Maine State Library in Augusta, Maine. Dove's definition reads "The library is an arena of possibility, opening both a window into the soul and a door onto the world.".

Besides her Pulitzer Prize, Dove has received numerous literary and academic honors, among them 29 honorary doctorates – most recently in 2022 from her graduate alma mater, the University of Iowa, as well as from Emerson College (2013), Emory University (2013)), Yale University (2014), Harvard University (2018), Smith College (2018), and The University of Michigan (2018). In 2016, she was the commencement speaker at the University of Virginia, which traditionally does not bestow honorary degrees. Among the other institutions of higher learning that granted her honorary doctorates are her undergraduate alma mater Miami University, Knox College, Tuskegee University, University of Miami (Florida), Washington University in St. Louis, Case Western Reserve University, The University of Akron, Arizona State University, Boston College, Dartmouth College, Spelman College, The University of Pennsylvania, The University of North Carolina at Chapel Hill, University of Notre Dame, Northeastern University, Columbia University, SUNY Brockport, Washington & Lee University, Howard University, the Pratt Institute, Skidmore College and Duke University.

Dove received the Golden Plate Award of the American Academy of Achievement in 1994, the National Humanities Medal / Charles Frankel Prize from President Bill Clinton in 1996, the 3rd Annual Heinz Award in the Arts and Humanities in 1997, and more recently, the 2006 Common Wealth Award of Distinguished Service in Literature, the 2007 Chubb Fellowship at Yale University, the 2008 Library of Virginia Lifetime Achievement Award, the 2009 Fulbright Lifetime Achievement Medal, the 2009 Premio Capri and the 2011 National Medal of Arts from President Barack Obama. In 2014, she was honored with the Carole Weinstein Prize in poetry and in 2015, as the first American, with the Poetry and People Prize in Guangdong, China. In 2016, she received the Stone Award for Lifetime Literary Achievement from Oregon State University. Collected Poems 1974–2004, released in 2016, was a finalist for the National Book Award, the winner of the NAACP Image Award in poetry and winner of the 2017 Library of Virginia Poetry Award. Also in 2017, she received the Callaloo Lifetime Achievement Award, followed in 2018 by The Kenyon Review Award for Literary Achievement and in 2019 by the Wallace Stevens Award from the Academy of American Poets, the North Star Award (the Hurston-Wright Legacy Award for lifetime achievement), the W.E.B. Du Bois Medal from Harvard University, and the Langston Hughes Medal from City College of New York.

Since 2015, Rita Dove's poem "Cozy Apologia" has been a part of the WJEC Edquas GCSE English Literature specification in England and Wales, featuring in its poetry anthology.

In 2021, Dove received the gold medal in poetry from the American Academy of Arts and Letters, the academy's highest honor, as the 16th poet (and only the 3rd female and 1st African-American) in the medals' 110-year history. The other fifteen poets who have received the medal since 1911 were James Whitcomb Riley, Edwin Arlington Robinson, Robert Frost, Marianne Moore, Conrad Aiken, William Carlos Williams, W. H. Auden, John Crowe Ransom, Archibald MacLeish, Robert Penn Warren, Richard Wilbur, John Ashbery, W. S. Merwin, Mark Strand and Louise Glück.

In 2022, an official portrait of Dove by photographer Sanjay Suchak, commissioned by the University of Virginia, was unveiled and is now prominently displayed in the front room of the university's historic Pavilion VII (Colonnade Club) on the West Lawn. Also in 2022, she won the Library of Virginia Poetry Award for Playlist for the Apocalypse and received two more lifetime achievement recognitions: a Ruth Lilly Poetry Prize from the Poetry Foundation and the Rebekah Johnson Bobbitt Prize from the Library of Congress.

On November 15, 2023, during the 74th National Book Awards ceremony in New York, Dove received the National Book Foundation's Medal for Distinguished Contribution to American Letters as only the fourth poet in this lifetime achievement category, after Gwendolyn Brooks in 1994, Adrienne Rich in 2006 and John Ashbery in 2011. This was followed by an Academy of American Poets Leadership Award and the Thomas Robinson Prize for Southern Literature from Mercer University in 2024.

Dove is a member of the American Philosophical Society, the American Academy of Arts and Sciences, the American Academy of Arts and Letters, where she currently serves as vice president for literature during the 2023 to 2026 board term, the Fellowship of Southern Writers and PEN American Center. She was inducted into the Ohio Women's Hall of Fame in 1991, and in 2018 she was named one of the Library of Virginia's Virginia Women in History.

== Personal life ==
Dove married Fred Viebahn, a German-born writer, in 1979; they first met in the summer of 1976 when she was a graduate student in the Iowa Writers Workshop and he spent a semester as a Fulbright fellow in the University of Iowa's International Writing Program. They lived in Oberlin, Ohio, from 1977 to 1979 while Viebahn taught in the Oberlin College German department, and spent extended periods of time in Germany, Ireland and Israel, before moving to Arizona in 1981. Their daughter, Aviva Dove-Viebahn, was born in Phoenix, Arizona, in 1983. The couple are avid ballroom dancers, and have participated in a number of showcase performances. Since 1989 Dove and her husband have been living in Charlottesville, Virginia.

== Bibliography ==
=== Poetry ===
==== Collections ====
- The Yellow House on the Corner. Pittsburgh: Carnegie-Mellon University Press. 1980. ISBN 0915604396.
- Only Dark Spot in the Sky. Tempe: Inland Boat / Porch Publications. 1980.
- Museum. Pittsburgh: Carnegie-Mellon University Press. 1983.
- Thomas and Beulah. Carnegie Mellon Press. 1986. ISBN 978-0-88748-021-8.
- Grace Notes: Poems. New York: W. W. Norton, 1989. ISBN 978-0-393-02719-8.
- Selected Poems. Pantheon/Vintage. 1993. ISBN 978-0-679-75080-2. Included in Harold Bloom's Western Canon list.
- Mother Love. New York: W. W. Norton. 1995. ISBN 978-0-393-31444-1.
- On the Bus with Rosa Parks. New York: Norton. 1999. ISBN 978-0-393-04722-6.
- American Smooth. New York: W. W. Norton. 2004. ISBN 978-0-393-05987-8.
- Sonata Mulattica. New York: W. W. Norton. 2009. ISBN 978-0-393-07008-8.
- Collected Poems 1974-2004. New York, London: W. W. Norton. 2016. ISBN 978-0-393-28594-9.
- Playlist for the Apocalypse. New York: W. W. Norton. 2021. ISBN 978-0-393-86777-0.

==== Anthologies (edited) ====
- The Penguin Anthology of Twentieth-Century American Poetry. New York: Penguin Books. 2011. ISBN 978-0-14-310643-2.
- The Best American Poetry 2000. New York: Scribner. 2000. ISBN 978-0-7432-0033-2.

=== Novels ===
- Through the Ivory Gate. Pantheon Books. 1992. ISBN 978-0-679-41604-3.

=== Short fiction ===
- Fifth Sunday. University of Kentucky, Callaloo Fiction Series. 1985. ISBN 978-0-912759-06-7. "The Zulus" included in Daughters of Africa, edited by Margaret Busby, 1992.

=== Drama ===
- The Darker Face of the Earth: A Verse Play in Fourteen Scenes (Story Line Press, 1994; revised edition: 1996)

=== Essays ===
- The Poet's World. Washington, DC: The Library of Congress. 1995. ISBN 9780844408743.

=== Scholarly books on Dove's work ===
- Steffen, Therese (2001). Crossing Color: Transcultural Space and Place in Rita Dove's Poetry, Fiction, and Drama. New York: Oxford University Press. ISBN 9780195134407.
- Ingersoll, Earl G., ed. (2003). Conversations with Rita Dove. Jackson: University Press of Mississippi. ISBN 9781578065493.
- Pereira, Malin (2003). Rita Dove's Cosmopolitanism. Urbana: University of Illinois Press. ISBN 9780252028373.
- Righelato, Pat (2006). Understanding Rita Dove. Columbia: University of South Carolina Press. ISBN 9781570036378.
- Roy, Lekha (2023). Towards Post-Blackness: A Critical Study of Rita Dove's Poetry. New York, Bern, Berlin, Bruxelles, Oxford, Wien: Peter Lang. ISBN 9781636671796.

=== Various other secondary literature (incomplete) ===
- Erickson, Peter. "Rita Dove's Shakespeares." In Marianne Novy (ed.), Transforming Shakespeare. New York: St. Martin's, 1999.
- Harrington, Walt, "The Shape of Her Dreaming: Rita Dove Writes a Poem." In Intimate Journalism. Thousand Oaks: Sage, 1997
- Keller, Lynn. "Sequences Testifying for 'Nobodies': Rita Dove's Thomas and Beulah and Brenda Marie Osbey's Desperate Circumstance, Dangerous Woman." In Forms of Expansion: Recent Long Poems by Women. Chicago: University of Chicago Press, 1997.
- McDowell, Robert. "The Assembling Vision of Rita Dove." In James McCorkle (ed.), Conversant Essays: Contemporary Poets on Poetry. Detroit: Wayne State University, 1990.
- Meitner, Erika. "On Rita Dove." In Arielle Greenberg and Rachel Zucker (eds), Women Poets on Mentorship. Iowa City: University of Iowa Press, 2008
- Shoptaw, John. "Segregated Lives: Rita Dove's Thomas and Beulah." In Henry Louis Gates Jr. (ed.), Reading Black, Reading Feminist. London: Penguin, 1990
- Galgano, Andrea. "Rita Dove. La grazia esatta" in Frontiera di Pagine II, pp. 723–734. Roma: Aracne, 2017
- Apolloni, Ag. Poetry is a kind of dance (Interview with Rita Dove). Symbol, No. 9/2017. Link: Poetry is a kind of dance
- Young, Kevin. "The Art of Poetry. No. 113." Interview with Rita Dove. In The Paris Review No. 243 (Spring 2023), pp. 114–148.

==== Very incomplete list of individual poems ====
Title	Year	First published	Reprinted/collected
"The Bridgetower"	2008	Dove, Rita (November 24, 2008). "The Bridgetower". The New Yorker. 84 (38): 90–91.	
"Last words"	2021	Dove, Rita (January 25, 2021). "Last words". The New Yorker. 96 (45): 38.	
"Hattie McDaniel arrives at the Coconut Grove"	2022	Dove, Rita (August 29, 2022). "Hattie McDaniel arrives at the Coconut Grove". The New Yorker. 98 (26): 24–25.	
