= The Writer's Chronicle =

- Frequency: Bimonthly
- First issue: 1967
- Company: Association of Writers & Writing Programs
- Country: United States
- Website: writerschronicle.awpwriter.org
- ISSN: 1529-5443

The Writer's Chronicle is a journal published six times each year. It is the flagship publication of the Association of Writers & Writing Programs.

The Writer's Chronicle "presents essays, articles, news, and information designed to enlighten, inform, and entertain writers, editors, students, and teachers of writing." The publication follows an academic print schedule, and there are six issues each year: September, October/November, December, February, March/April, and May/Summer.

Articles and essays included in the Chronicle focus on the art and craft of writing as well as pedagogy. . The Chronicle lists information on grants, awards, fellowships, websites, conferences/centers/festivals, and publishing opportunities in every issue. Each issue of the Chronicle also features news on the national literary scene, including updates on AWP's Annual Conference and information on AWP's contests, such as the AWP Award Series and interviews.

This publication began its run in 1967 as the AWP Newsletter. In May 1989 it became AWP Chronicle, and in September 1998 it was renamed the Writer's Chronicle. Nearly 1000 Chronicle articles dating back to 1970 are available online to members of Association of Writers & Writing Programs on the members-only website.
