= Marianne L. Novy =

American literary scholar

Marianne L. Novy is an American literary scholar known for her work on Shakespeare, feminist literary criticism, and adoption studies. She taught for many years at the University of Pittsburgh, where she became Professor of English and later Professor Emerita. Her research focuses on gender, family, identity, and cultural representations in literature.

== Early life and education ==
Novy studied English literature at several major universities. She earned her Bachelor of Arts degree from Trinity College in Washington, D.C., graduating cum laude in 1965. She then completed a Master of Arts degree at Harvard University in 1967.

In 1973, she received her Ph.D. in English from Yale University. During her graduate studies, she was supported by Danforth and Woodrow Wilson Fellowships.

== Career ==
=== Academic positions ===
Novy spent most of her academic career at the University of Pittsburgh. She began as an instructor in 1971 and later became Assistant Professor, Associate Professor, and then full Professor of English in 1992. She retired in 2016 and was named Professor Emerita.

She also held visiting and academic roles at other institutions, including serving as a Visiting Scholar at Duke University (2006–2007) and teaching at the College of Wooster (1969–71).

=== Leadership and administration ===
Novy served as Director of the Women’s Studies Program at the University of Pittsburgh in multiple terms (1978 and 1994–1996). She also participated in university governance, including election to the Faculty Assembly and the University Senate’s Tenure and Academic Freedom Committee.

=== Teaching ===
Novy taught a wide range of courses at both graduate and undergraduate levels. Her teaching included Shakespeare, gender and sexuality, Victorian women novelists, adoption literature, and feminist theory. She also taught courses on Renaissance literature, women in drama, contemporary women writers, and general literary studies.

=== Research and contributions ===
Novy’s research centers on Shakespeare studies, feminist criticism, and adoption studies. She has explored how literature represents gender roles, family structures, and social identity.

She is also known for helping to develop the academic field of adoption studies. She co-founded the Alliance for the Study of Adoption and Culture and helped organize several international conferences on the topic between 2005 and 2016.

== Publications ==
=== Books ===
Novy has written and edited several books on Shakespeare, gender, and adoption, including:

- Love's Argument: Gender Relations in Shakespeare (1984)
- Women's Re-Visions of Shakespeare (1990, editor)
- Cross-Cultural Performances (1993, editor)
- Engaging with Shakespeare (1994)
- Transforming Shakespeare (1999, editor)
- Imagining Adoption: Essays on Literature and Culture (2001, editor)
- Reading Adoption: Family and Difference in Fiction and Drama (2005)
- Shakespeare and Outsiders (2013)
- Shakespeare and Feminist Theory (2017)
- Adoption Memoirs: Inside Stories (2024)
- Cross-Cultural Performances: Differences in Women’s Re-Visions of Shakespeare
- Engaging with Shakespeare: Responses of George Eliot and Other Women Novelists.

=== Articles and book chapters ===
Novy has published many scholarly articles and book chapters. Her work often discusses Shakespeare, family relationships, adoption, and gender identity.

Some examples include:

- “Teaching Changing Families to Get Adoption into the Curriculum” (2019)
- “Class, Shame, and Identity in Memoirs about Adoption” (2018)
- “Shakespeare and the Novel” (2011)
- “Middlemarch and George Eliot’s Female (Re)Vision of Shakespeare” (1991)

=== Reviews ===
She has also written reviews of academic books and films related to literature, Shakespeare, and adoption studies in journals such as Shakespeare Quarterly and Renaissance Quarterly.

== Professional service ==
Novy has contributed extensively to academic service. She served on editorial boards, advisory boards, and as a reviewer for many academic presses and journals. She was a trustee of the Shakespeare Association of America (2004–2007) and served as a delegate to the Modern Language Association (MLA). She also played a major role in organizing international conferences on adoption and culture and served as newsletter editor for the Alliance for the Study of Adoption and Culture.
