= Adam Bradley (literary critic) =

American literary critic (born 1974)

- Born: July 31, 1974 (age 52); Salt Lake City, Utah, United States
- Education: Lewis & Clark College; Harvard University
- Occupations: Literary critic, professor, and writer on popular culture

Adam Francis Bradley (born July 31, 1974) is an American literary critic, professor, and a writer on popular culture. He is the author or editor of six books. Bradley has written extensively on song lyrics as well as on the literature and legacy of the American novelist Ralph Ellison. His commentary has appeared in The New York Times, The Wall Street Journal, The Washington Post and in numerous other publications. He is a professor of English at the University of California, Los Angeles, where he directs the Laboratory for Race & Popular Culture (RAP Lab).

== Early life ==
Bradley was born in Salt Lake City, Utah, United States, to Jane Bradley and Jim Terry. When he was a first-grade elementary school student in Los Gatos, California, his teacher informed his mother that her son was a nice boy but should be held back a grade. Bradley's mother pulled him out of school and moved back to Salt Lake City with her parents, both educators. Bradley's grandparents home-schooled him until high school, emphasizing a liberal arts curriculum. After graduating from Olympus High School in Salt Lake City, Bradley went on to complete a BA degree in English at Lewis & Clark College in Portland, Oregon. As a sophomore at Lewis & Clark, Bradley began working as a research assistant for Professor John F. Callahan, a friend and soon-to-be-named literary executor of the late African-American novelist Ralph Ellison. Upon his death in 1994, Ellison left behind thousands of manuscript pages and computer files related to his long-in-progress second novel, a follow-up to his 1952 classic, Invisible Man. Working with Ellison's unpublished manuscripts proved a formative experience for Bradley, who decided to attend graduate school to study English so that he could continue collaborating with Callahan on Ellison's papers.

== Career ==
In 2003, Bradley earned his Ph.D. in English from Harvard University, where he studied with Henry Louis Gates Jr. and Cornel West. After a fellowship at Dartmouth College, Bradley accepted an assistant professorship at Claremont McKenna College in Claremont, California. In 2009, he became a tenured associate professor of English at the University of Colorado, Boulder. In 2013, Bradley founded the Laboratory for Race & Popular Culture (RAP Lab), "an interdisciplinary space for developing and exchanging ideas at the intersection of race and popular culture." Among its initiatives is Hip Hop in the Classroom, which uses rap music to help middle school and high school teachers increase their students' interest in the language arts.

== Works on song lyrics ==
Bradley is recognized for bringing the study of literary criticism to song lyrics. His first book, Book of Rhymes, applies the tools of poetic analysis to the beats and rhymes of hip hop. The term "book of rhymes" is a reference to the composition notebooks rappers often use to compose and to collect their rhymes. Bradley argues that "the book of rhymes is where rap becomes poetry". In the first part of the book, he analyzes rap's rhythm, rhyme, and wordplay. In the second part, he looks at style, storytelling, and signifying. Among the key critical concepts Bradley introduces is the dual rhythmic relationship, the collaboration of voice and beat in rap music.

Book of Rhymes was reviewed widely. The Boston Globe wrote: "Biggie had flow; Jay-Z has flow. For an English professor, Adam Bradley got some flow of his own." While critiquing the book's defense of hip hop culture, The New York Times called it "a triumph of jargon free scrutiny". Writing in Library Journal, Joshua Finnell noted that "Bradley is emerging as a pioneering scholar in the study of hip-hop." In 2013, Book of Rhymes was selected by the University of Pennsylvania as their summer reading text for first-year students, an honor previously bestowed on Michael Pollan's The Omnivore's Dilemma, Chinua Achebe's Things Fall Apart, and Maxine Hong Kingston's The Woman Warrior.

In 2010, Bradley (along with co-editor, Andrew DuBois) published The Anthology of Rap, which was described as "an English major's hip-hop bible". At 900 pages, the Anthology collects and organizes nearly three hundred lyrics from across hip hop's history.

In 2011, Bradley collaborated with the rapper and actor Common on Common's memoir, One Day It'll All Make Sense. The book follows Common's life from his childhood on the South Side of Chicago to his multidimensional entertainment career today. The late author Maya Angelou called it a "magnificent memoir." The journalist and author Touré described it as "a thoughtful and beautiful book." It won the 2012 Street Lit Book Award for Adult Nonfiction. One Day It'll All Make Sense went on to become a New York Times bestseller.

In 2017, Bradley published The Poetry of Pop, which The Daily Telegraph described as "a sort of readers' manual for pop." Writing in The Washington Post, Michael Lindgren observed that "Bradley deploys a formidable set of skills. He has an acute ear, dazzling command of seemingly the entire history of pop and a pleasingly wide range of taste, drawing on examples from Gershwin to Guns 'n' Roses to make his points."

== Works on Ralph Ellison ==
External videos
- Discussion with Adam Bradley on Three Days Before the Shooting..., March 28, 2008, C-SPAN
- Presentation by John Callahan and Adam Bradley on Three Days Before the Shooting..., February 3, 2010, C-SPAN

Bradley has published two books related to the novelist Ralph Ellison. Three Days Before the Shooting...: The Unfinished Second Novel, written by Ralph Ellison and edited by Bradley and John Callahan, is a collection of manuscripts from Ellison's never-completed second novel. Ellison began writing his second novel around the time of Invisible Man's publication in 1952. Though he released several excerpts from his novel-in-progress over the next forty years, Ellison failed to publish the long-anticipated novel during his lifetime. In 1999, Callahan released a portion of Ellison's novel under the title of Juneteenth.

At more than a thousand pages, Three Days Before the Shooting... constitutes the fullest version of Ellison's uncompleted vision. Set at the dawn of the civil rights movement, the novel concerns the relationship between a black minister named Alonzo Hickman and his surrogate son of indeterminate race, Bliss, who grows up to become a racist New England senator. [Howard] Three Days Before the Shooting... was named one of the year's best works of outsider fiction by NPR, one of "Oprah's Books to Watch," and a Best Book of 2010 by The Root.

Soon after the publication of Three Days Before the Shooting..., Bradley published Ralph Ellison In Progress, which traces the history of Ellison's composition of his two novels, one published to great acclaim, the other remaining unpublished until years after his death. Among the insights in the book is that Ellison was an early adopter of the personal computer as a tool of literary composition. Using an Osborne 1 and Osborne 2, marketed as among the world's first portable computers for business, and WordStar software, Ellison amassed several thousand pages of drafts related to his second novel. Bradley speculates that though the computer undoubtedly facilitated Ellison's productivity, it may well have inhibited his ability to complete his novel so long in progress. The African-American novelist Ishmael Reed observed that with Ralph Ellison in Progress: "Adam Bradley has made literary criticism interesting again."

== Personal life ==
Bradley is married to Anna Spain Bradley, a professor of international law at the University of Colorado, Boulder.

== Bibliography ==
- Book of Rhymes: The Poetics of Hip Hop (2009), Basic Civitas Books. ISBN 0465003478
- Three Days Before the Shooting... (2010), Random House. ISBN 0375759549
- Ralph Ellison in Progress: From Invisible Man to Three Days Before the Shooting... (2010), Yale University Press. ISBN 0300171196
- The Anthology of Rap (2010), Yale University Press. ISBN 0300141912
- One Day It'll All Make Sense, (2011) Atria Books. ISBN 145162588X
- The Poetry of Pop, (2017) Yale University Press. ISBN 0300165021
