= Juneteenth (novel) =

1999 novel by Ralph Ellison

- Author: Ralph Ellison
- Language: English
- Genre: African-American literature
- Publisher: Random House
- Publication date: 1999
- Publication place: United States
- Media type: Print (Hardcover and Paperback)
- Pages: 368
- ISBN: 0-394-46457-5

Juneteenth (1999) is the second novel by American writer Ralph Ellison. It was published posthumously, compiled as a 368-page condensation of material from more than 2,000 pages written by him over a period of 40 years. He had never completed a manuscript from this material. Ellison's longtime friend and literary executor, biographer and critic John F. Callahan, created the novel. He edited it in the way he believed that Ellison would have wanted it to be written.

A fuller version of the manuscript was published as Three Days Before the Shooting... on February 2, 2010.

== History ==
Ellison began work on his second novel around 1954, following the 1952 publication of Invisible Man and its success.

Part of the original manuscript of Juneteenth was destroyed by a fire in 1967, and Ellison claimed to be devastated by the loss. But biographer Arnold Rampersad later speculated that the loss of the crucial, irrecoverable sections of his manuscript appears to have been something Ellison concocted after the fact to justify his lack of progress. In his 2007 biography of Ellison, Rampersad points out that, following the fire, Ellison wrote to critic Nathan Scott of his relief that he still "fortunately had a full copy" of all his writing. In different interviews, Ellison described his lost manuscript pages were described as "360 pages, and "500 pages", and "about a summer’s worth of revisions".

Ellison published eight excerpts from the novel during his lifetime. These include an excerpt called "Juneteenth" in the Quarterly Review of Literature in 1965, and the story "Cadillac Flambé", published in American Review in 1973 and reprinted many times since. These received considerable critical attention, and there was much interest in Ellison's unpublished work. Although he had written over 2,000 pages by the time of his death, Ellison never completed the novel.

== Publication ==
Following Ellison's death, John F. Callahan, named Ellison's literary executor by his widow, was pressed to release the manuscript. But the pages of manuscript were not organized and Ellison had left no notes to indicate a structure. For this work, Callahan took the central episode from Ellison's manuscripts, and created a single volume around it. He promised that a full version would be made available at a later time.

=== Reviews ===
The long-awaited novel received mixed reviews. The Guardian said that although the work was published with the subtitle "a novel," it "is decidedly not a novel: it lacks a novel's shape, rationale, and self-justifying propulsion." Publishers Weekly acknowledged Callahan's "difficulties" in putting the novel together from Ellison's incomplete manuscript, but concluded "this volume is a visionary tour de force, a lyrical, necessary contribution to America's perennial racial dialogue, and a novel powerfully reinforcing Ellison's place in literary history." Scott Saul in Boston Review states "The book is more than Ellison fans could expect, yet less than Ellison probably hoped--an ambivalent masterpiece."

=== Longer version ===
A fuller version of the manuscript was published as Three Days Before the Shooting... on February 2, 2010.

== See also ==
- Juneteenth
