= Adam Bradley =

Adam Bradley may refer to:

- Adam Bradley (politician) (born 1961), former New York State Assemblyman and former mayor of White Plains
- Adam Bradley (literary critic) (born 1974), American literary critic, professor and writer
