= Nefertite Nguvu =

American filmmaker

Nefertite Nguvu is a writer, director, and producer and founder of the production company Hollywood Africans. Her multiple award-winning first feature film, In the Morning, was shot in eight days. Shadow and Act said of In the Morning, “Nguvu crafts each relationship and character as its own poem, evoking a certain emotion that is elevated by the cinematography of renowned image-maker Arthur Jafa.” She created her short film, The Last Two Lovers at the End of the World with AT&T Hello Lab.
