= A Party Down at the Square =

1997 short story by Ralph Ellison

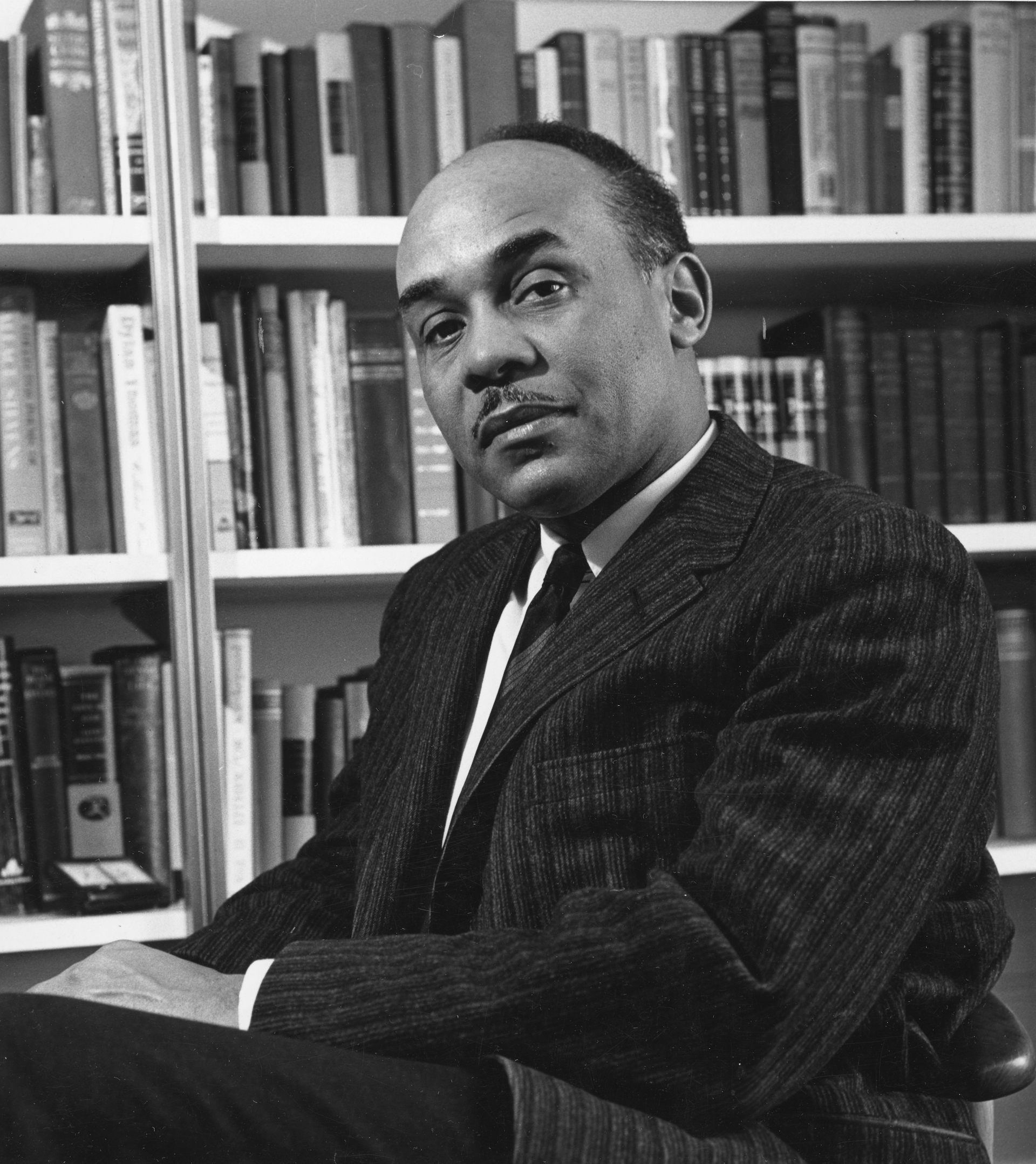
Ralph Ellison, the author of "A Party Down at the Square"

"A Party Down at the Square" is a short story by the American writer Ralph Ellison, first published in 1997, three years after the author's death. It is a story of a Deep South lynching as perceived by a white boy from Cincinnati, Ohio.

== Summary ==
The short story “A Party Down at the Square” is the story of a boy who witnesses a lynching. The young boy is at his uncle's house somewhere in the Deep South when a bunch of men come in a hurry saying there will be a party down at the square. The reader then realizes that the “party” consists of a lynching of a young black man. The whole town is attending, except for the town's black population, and everyone is screaming and yelling in excitement for the lynching of this young man. With a storm confusing, an airplane crashes through electric power lines but lands successfully near the town square. A young woman gets electrocuted and dies instantly, the plane is on fire, and electrical wires are sparking.

Despite the mayhem of the storm and plane landing, the mob turns its focus back on the young black man who is getting burned to death. When the black man politely asks for a quick death, Jed Wilson, a leader of the lynch mob, refuses, saying, "...ain't no Christians around tonight." The black man burns to death, his corpse turning to ashes.

After the emotional experience of the night, the narrator falls ill, causing him to be mocked by his Southern relatives. Later at a general store, a poor white sharecropper speaks out against the lynching, arguing that it does not serve a purpose. The other people in the town tell him to "shut his damn mouth." The visceral experience of the night, in particular the toughness of the young black man, lingers on for the narrator.

== Analysis of narrator ==
The story is written from the narrator's perspective, a white boy from Cincinnati.

== Characters ==
Lynching victim
The young black man is the victim. The lynch mob ties up with a rope and puts gasoline on his feet. Under extreme suffering, he asks the crowd to "please cut [his] throat" – a request curtly rebuffed by Jed Wilson, leader of the mob.

Jed Wilson
In the story, Jed Wilson seems to lead the mob. Popular in the town, he is expected to be voted sheriff. When the lynching victim asks for mercy, Jed refuses, saying, "...ain't no Christians around tonight....We're just one hundred percent Americans", drawing laughs from the crowd.

Woman burned by electric wire
After the plane knocks down electric power lines, the large crowd gathers and accidentally knocks a white woman toward the live wires, burning and killing her. When the crowd turns their attention from her to return to the burning of the black man, the mob's near-total desensitization to violence is shown.

== Themes ==
Bystander effect
Throughout the story, the narrator mentions how he is physically disgusted by the events he witnesses, but he continues to view them. The Bystander Effect is the idea that the larger the crowd, the less likely one individual to come to the aid of someone becomes.

Desensitization to violence
The narrator witnesses the physical burning of a black man as well as the electrocution and death of a white woman. Although the narrator does get physically ill at the events, his uncle later tells him of the lynching, "You get used to it in time."

Innocence

Becoming a Man

== Symbols ==
Plane
While the events of the lynching harken back to the days when the Ku Klux Klan was widely popular, the plane introduces an aspect of modernity to the story. When the narrator writes that "the airplane line is investigating to find who set the fire that almost wrecked their plane", it's odd that no one is concerned with investigating the extrajudicial killing of a black man.

== Use of the word "Nigger" ==
In "A Party Down at the Square", "nigger" appears over 40 times in the story. The word adds realism to the story, as it was a common word in the setting of the story. Ellison uses the word to get the reader to grasp a deeper understanding of the racist mindset because it has helped deeply ingrain racism into the thought processes of the narrator. The word dehumanizes the lynch mob victim, which makes "A Party Down at the Square" a powerful indictment of the history of Southern racism.
