= Book of Rhymes =

Book by Adam Bradley

Book of Rhymes: The Poetics of Hip Hop
- Author: Adam Bradley
- Cover artist: Keenan
- Language: English
- Subject: Hip hop
- Genre: Non-fiction
- Publisher: Basic Civitas Books
- Publication date: February 23, 2009
- Publication place: United States
- Pages: 272 pp
- ISBN: 0-465-00347-8
- OCLC: 246894813
- Dewey Decimal: 782.421649 22
- LC Class: ML3531 .B73 2009

Book of Rhymes: The Poetics of Hip Hop is a book by literary scholar Adam Bradley that looks at hip hop music's literary techniques and argues "that we must understand rap as poetry or miss the vanguard of poetry today". The Dallas Morning News described it by saying, "You'll find Yeats and Frost alongside Nas and...Wu-Tang Clan, together forming a discussion on meter and accent, scansion, and slant rhymes". Bradley is an associate professor of English at the University of Colorado at Boulder, with a PhD in English from Harvard University.

== Contents ==
The book breaks hip hop’s poetics down into the following parts:

- Rhythm
- Rhyme
- Word play
- Style
- Storytelling
- Signifying

== Reception ==
The book was praised by various press outlets such as the Los Angeles Times, The Dallas Morning News, The Boston Globe, and The New York Times.

In particular, the book is praised for focusing on the poetics of hip hop music rather than examining the outlying societal factors—the Los Angeles Times noted, “As a key part of America's youth culture and a central battlefield in our culture wars, hip hop often seems to have forfeited the right to be discussed as art. Most academic and popular writers subjugate its aesthetics to its politics…until very recently, such writers could be counted on to begin around the time of hip-hop's birth and attempt to tackle the entire culture. Luckily, a new paradigm of scholarship is emerging, and Adam Bradley's "Book of Rhymes: The Poetics of Hip Hop" is a solid contribution.” and The Dallas Morning News commented, “Where so many hip-hop studies lean heavily on politics and sociology, Book of Rhymes is a welcome and thorough exploration of rap aesthetics that isn't afraid to be learned.” The New York Times observed, "It is a "crash course. . .essentially English 101 meets Hip-Hop Studies 101."

Criticism of the book came from The New York Times, which said, "Bradley wants to legitimize rap by setting it in a canonical context, but aren’t we past the point of justifying it? No one is really still debating whether hip-hop is a bona fide art form. In his tone of unwarranted protectiveness, he seems to forget that hip-hop now earns highbrow props worldwide. After three decades, it doesn’t require a defense attorney."
