= Shadow and Act =

1964 collection of essays by Ralph Ellison

- First edition
- Author: Ralph Ellison
- Language: English
- Genre: Essay
- Publisher: Random House
- Publication date: 1964; 62 years ago
- Publication place: America
- Media type: Print (hardcover)
- Pages: 352 pp
- Preceded by: Invisible Man
- Followed by: Going to the Territory

Shadow and Act is a 1964 collection of essays by Ralph Ellison. It was his second book published since his 1952 debut Invisible Man.

== Subject ==
The writings encompass the two decades that began with Ellison's involvement with African-American political activism and print media in Harlem, Ellison's emergence as a highly acclaimed writer with the publication of Invisible Man, and culminating with his 1964 challenge of Irving Howe's characterization of African-American life, "Black Boys and Native Sons", with his now famous essay, "The World and the Jug". Ellison in his Introduction to the collection described it as exemplary of his "attempt to transform some of the themes, the problems, the enigmas, the contradictions of character and culture native to my predicament, into what André Malraux has described as 'conscious thought'."

== Title ==
The title of the collection derives from Ellison's 1948 review of the film version of William Faulkner's Intruder in the Dust, entitled "The Shadow and the Act", which expanded upon his critique in "Twentieth Century Fiction and the Black Mask of Humanity" of the vicious and detrimental stereotypes rampant in mainstream American culture. Ellison derived the actual phrase "Shadow and Act" from the fifth Stanza of T. S. Eliot's The Hollow Men, which reads: "Between the idea / And the reality / Between the motion / And the act / Falls the Shadow."

== Reception ==
Kirkus Reviews began a 1964 appraisal of Shadow and Act by describing Ellison's 1952 debut, Invisible Man, as "a literary marker of the last decades", going on to state that by comparison his second book, "a collection of essays written over various periods, some when quite young, some as recent as last year, is a rather modest affair. ...The pieces do present, however, an autobiographical accounting and the themes, extending from jazz and blues to literature and folklore, are much engagements with a writer's mind as they are facets of a writer's experiences. Here is the confrontation between "outlaw" culture and official culture, between, in fact, Negro America and America as a whole."

Reviewing the collection in 1965, R. W. B. Lewis said: "Shadow and Act contains Ralph Ellison’s real autobiography....The experiences of writing Invisible Man and of vaulting on his first try “over the parochial limits of most Negro fiction” (as Richard G. Stern says in an interview), and, as a result, of being written about as a literary and sociological phenomenon, combined with sheer compositional difficulties, seem to have driven Ellison to search out the truths of his own past. Inquiring into his experience, his literary and musical education, Ellison has come up with a number of clues to the fantastic fate of trying to be at the same time a writer, a Negro, an American, and a human being."

A review by Robert Penn Warren commented on Ellison's interfusion of the moral and the artistic, quoting from the book's preface: "I found the greatest difficulty for a Negro writer was the problem of revealing what he truly felt, rather than serving up what Negroes were supposed to feel, and were encouraged to feel."

In 1999, the Modern Library named Shadow and Act at number 91 on its list of the 100 best nonfiction books of the 20th century.
