= John F. Callahan =

External videos
- Presentation by John Callahan on Juneteenth, June 30, 1999, C-SPAN
- Presentation by John Callahan and Adam Bradley on Three Days Before the Shooting..., February 3, 2010, C-SPAN

John F. Callahan is the literary executor for Ralph Ellison, and was the editor for his posthumously-released novel Juneteenth. In addition to his work with Ellison, Callahan has written or edited numerous volumes related to African-American literature, with a particular emphasis on 20th century literature.

Some of Callahan's other works include In the African-American Grain: The Pursuit of Voice in 20th Century Black Fiction, Ralph Ellison's Invisible Man: A Casebook, and The Illusions of a Nation: Myth and History in the Novels of F. Scott Fitzgerald. Callahan also edited Ellison's short story collection Flying Home and co-edited with Albert Murray the Modern Library edition of Trading Twelves: The Selected Letters of Ralph Ellison and Albert Murray. As Darryl Pinckney has observed: "Thanks to Callahan, there are more Ellison titles now than existed during his lifetime."

In 2010 Callahan published a fuller version of Ellison's unfinished second novel as Three Days Before the Shooting.

Callahan previously served as the Morgan S. Odell Professor of Humanities at Lewis & Clark College. He retired in 2015 after 48 years at the college.

He earned his B.A. from the University of Connecticut and his M.A. and Ph.D. from the University of Illinois.

Callahan is the author of A Man You Could Love, a novel published in 2007 by Fulcrum Publishing.

In 2015, Callahan donated his papers to the Lewis & Clark Archives.
