= Mary Weston Fordham =

American poet

Mary Weston Fordham (c.1843–1905) was an African American poet and teacher. She published the poetry collection Magnolia Leaves in 1897.

== Biography ==
Frontispiece to Magnolia Leaves (1897) by Mary Weston Fordham

Mary Weston Fordham was born in Charleston, South Carolina likely around the year 1843. Her parents were Louise Bonneau and Rev. Samuel Weston. Her parents and extended family were skilled laborers and land owners. She became a poet and an educator. She ran a school for African American children during the American Civil War. After the war, she worked as a teacher for the American Missionary Association. Her poetry indicates that she was the mother of six children, all of whom died.

Her collection Magnolia Leaves includes 66 poems and offers a presentation of African American families during the Reconstruction Era. The introduction to the book is written by Booker T. Washington, in which he reflects on his concerns for African American families. The tone and subject of Fordham's poetry matches that of many white female poets of the period: sentimentality, moral virtues, and explorations of death, motherhood, patriotism, and Christianity.

== Published works ==
- Fordham, Mary Weston (1897). Magnolia Leaves, Charleston: Walker, Evans & Cogswell Co.
