= Ralph Ellison =

American novelist, literary critic, scholar and writer (1913–1994)

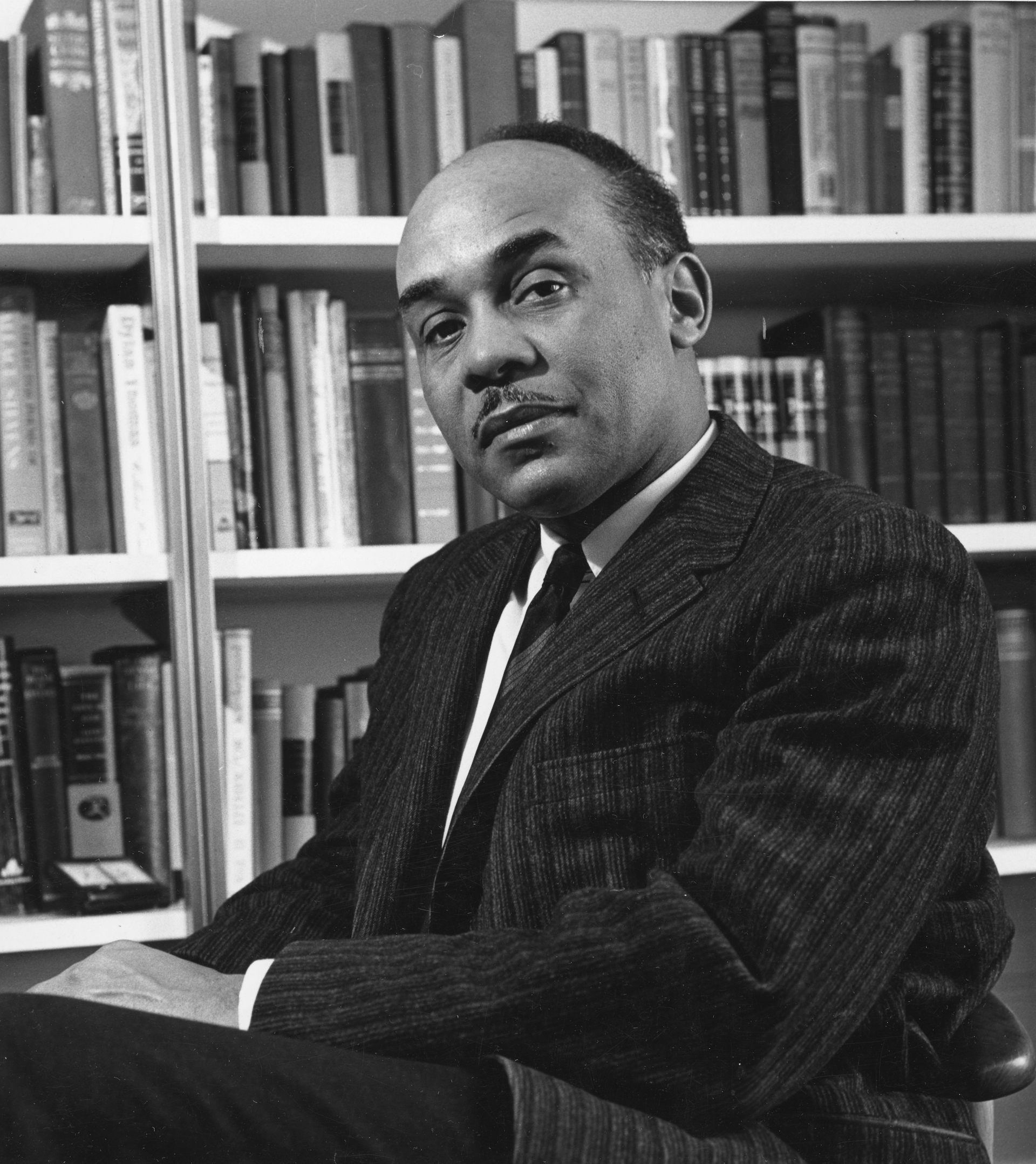
- Ellison in 1961
- Born: Ralph Waldo Ellison; March 1, 1913; Oklahoma City, Oklahoma, U.S.
- Died: April 16, 1994 (aged 81); New York City, U.S.
- Education: Tuskegee University
- Occupation: Writer
- Writing career
- Genres: Essay, criticism, novel, short story
- Notable work: Invisible Man (1952)
- Notable awards: National Book Award (1953); National Medal of Arts (1985)

Ralph Waldo Ellison (March 1, 1913 (Note: Ellison biographer Rampersad writes: "For most of his life Ralph would offer 1914 as the correct year", yet the 1920 U.S. Census lists Ellison as "six years old" in January of that year, hence born in 1913. A surviving note in his mother's hand kept behind a photograph of Ellison "as a toddler, sets his time and date of birth as 1:30 a.m. on Saturday, March 1, 1914. But March 1 fell on a Saturday in 1913, not in 1914. Someone had changed 1913 to 1914 after an erasure." More evidence comes from Ellison's memory of his father's death: Ellison "always insisted he was three years old when the worst disaster of his life occurred: On July 19, 1916, his father died after an operation.") – April 16, 1994) was an American writer, literary critic, and scholar best known for his novel Invisible Man, which won the National Book Award in 1953.

Ellison wrote Shadow and Act (1964), a collection of political, social, and critical essays, and Going to the Territory (1986). The New York Times dubbed him "among the gods of America's literary Parnassus".

A posthumous novel, Juneteenth, was published after being assembled from voluminous notes Ellison left upon his death.

== Early life ==
Ralph Waldo Ellison, named after Ralph Waldo Emerson, was born in Oklahoma City, Oklahoma, to Lewis Alfred Ellison and Ida Millsap, on March 1, 1913. He was the second of three sons; firstborn Alfred died in infancy, and younger brother Herbert Maurice (or Millsap) was born in 1916. Lewis Alfred Ellison, a small-business owner and a construction foreman, died in 1916, after work-related injury and a failed operation. The elder Ellison loved literature, and doted on his children. Ralph later discovered, as an adult, that his father had hoped he would grow up to be a poet.

In 1921, Ellison's mother and her children moved to Gary, Indiana, where she had a brother. According to Ellison, his mother felt that "my brother and I would have a better chance of reaching manhood if we grew up in the north." When she did not find a job and her brother lost his, the family returned to Oklahoma, where Ellison worked as a busboy, a shoeshine boy, hotel waiter, and a dentist's assistant. From the father of a neighborhood friend, he received free lessons for playing trumpet and alto saxophone, and would go on to become the school bandmaster.

Ida remarried three times after Lewis died. (Note: Her second marriage ended before 1924. On July 8, 1924, she married James Ammons, who died in 1926. In December 1929 she married John Bell.) However, the family life was precarious, and Ralph worked various jobs during his youth and teens to assist with family support. While attending Douglass High School, he also found time to play on the school's football team. He graduated from high school in 1931. He worked for a year, and found the money to make a down payment on a trumpet, using it to play with local musicians, and to take further music lessons. At Douglass, he was influenced by principal Inman E. Page and his daughter, music teacher Zelia N. Breaux.

== At Tuskegee Institute ==
Ellison applied twice for admission to Tuskegee Institute, the prestigious all-black university in Alabama founded by Booker T. Washington. He was finally admitted in 1933 because the orchestra needed a trumpet player. Ellison hopped freight trains to get to Alabama, and was soon to find out that the institution was no less class-conscious than white institutions generally were.

Ellison's outsider position at Tuskegee "sharpened his satirical lens," critic Hilton Als believes: "Standing apart from the university's air of sanctimonious Negritude enabled him to write about it." In passages of Invisible Man, "he looks back with scorn and despair on the snivelling ethos that ruled at Tuskegee."

Tuskegee's music department was perhaps the most renowned department at the school, headed by composer William L. Dawson. Ellison also was guided by the department's piano instructor, Hazel Harrison. While he studied music primarily in his classes, he spent his free time in the library with modernist classics. He cited reading T. S. Eliot's The Waste Land as a major awakening moment. In 1934, he began to work as a desk clerk at the university library, where he read James Joyce and Gertrude Stein. Librarian Walter Bowie Williams enthusiastically let Ellison share in his knowledge.

A major influence upon Ellison was English teacher Morteza Drexel Sprague, to whom Ellison later dedicated his essay collection Shadow and Act. He opened Ellison's eyes to "the possibilities of literature as a living art" and to "the glamour he would always associate with the literary life." Through Sprague, Ellison became familiar with Fyodor Dostoevsky's Crime and Punishment and Thomas Hardy's Jude the Obscure, identifying with the "brilliant, tortured anti-heroes" of those works.

As a child, Ellison evidenced what would become a lifelong interest in audio technology, starting by taking apart and rebuilding radios, and later moving on to constructing and customizing elaborate hi-fi stereo systems as an adult. He discussed this passion in a December 1955 essay, "Living With Music", in High Fidelity magazine. Ellison scholar John S. Wright contends that this deftness with the ins-and-outs of electronic devices went on to inform Ellison's approach to writing and the novel form. Ellison remained at Tuskegee until 1936, and decided to leave before completing the requirements for a degree.

== In New York ==
Desiring to study sculpture, he moved to New York City on July 5, 1936, and found lodging at a YMCA on 135th Street in Harlem, then "the culture capital of black America". He met Langston Hughes, "Harlem's unofficial diplomat" of the Depression era, and someone—as one of the country's celebrity black authors—who could live from his writing. Hughes introduced him to the black literary establishment with Communist sympathies.

Ellison met several artists who would influence his later life, including the artist Romare Bearden and the author Richard Wright (with whom he would have a long and complicated relationship). After Ellison wrote a book review for Wright, Wright encouraged him to write fiction as a career. Ellison's first published story was "Hymie's Bull", inspired by his 1933 hoboing on a train with his uncle to get to Tuskegee. From 1937 to 1944, Ellison had more than 20 book reviews, as well as short stories and articles, published in magazines such as New Challenge and The New Masses.

Ellison was also influenced to experiment with photography through his friendship with photographer Gordon Parks. The two collaborated on a photo essay in 1948, "Harlem is Nowhere", on the first racially integrated psychiatric clinic called Lafargue Clinic in Harlem, along with other photography projects over the years. Ellison's essay "The Pictorial Problem" was meant to be a manifesto of how images could psychologically impact the viewer. While working with Gordon Parks, Ellison was an inspiration to Gordon on creating impactful photographs. Ellison's essay would later become a guiding principle for Parks's photography.

Wright was then openly associated with the Communist Party, and Ellison was publishing and editing for communist publications, although his "affiliation was quieter", according to historian Carol Polsgrove in Divided Minds. Both Wright and Ellison lost their faith in the Communist Party during World War II, when they felt the party had betrayed African Americans and replaced Marxist class politics with social reformism. In a letter to Wright, dated August 18, 1945, Ellison poured out his anger with party leaders: "If they want to play ball with the bourgeoisie they needn't think they can get away with it. ... Maybe we can't smash the atom, but we can, with a few well chosen, well written words, smash all that crummy filth to hell." In the wake of this disillusion, Ellison began writing Invisible Man, a novel that was, in part, his response to the party's betrayal.

External videos
- Presentation by Arnold Ramperad at the Library of Congress on Ralph Ellison: A Biography, May 3, 2007, C-SPAN
- Presentation by Arnold Ramperad at the National Book Festival on Ralph Ellison: A Biography, September 29, 2007, C-SPAN

In 1938, Ellison met Rose Araminta Poindexter, a woman two years his senior. (Note: Rose Araminta Poindexter was born on November 30, 1911, in Harlem, New York, to Anna and Clarence Poindexter.) She was an actress, starring in films such as The Upright Sinner (1931). Poindexter and Ellison were married in late 1938. Poindexter continued her career as a stage actress after their marriage. In biographer Arnold Rampersad's assessment of Ellison's taste in women, he was searching for one "physically attractive and smart who would love, honor, and obey him—but not challenge his intellect." At first they lived at 312 West 122nd Street, Rose's apartment, but moved to 453 West 140th Street after her income shrank. In 1941, he briefly had an affair with Sanora Babb, which he confessed to his wife afterwards, and in 1943 the marriage was over. The couple officially divorced in 1945.

At the start of World War II, Ellison was classed 1A by the local Selective Service System, and thus eligible for the draft. However, he was not drafted. Toward the end of the war, he enlisted in the United States Merchant Marine. In 1946, he married Fanny McConnell, an accomplished person in her own right: a scholarship graduate of the University of Iowa who was a founder of the Negro People's Theater in Chicago and a writer for The Chicago Defender. While he wrote Invisible Man, she helped support Ellison financially by working for American Medical Center for Burma Frontiers (the charity supporting Gordon S. Seagrave's medical missionary work). In 1946, Ellison composed and wrote the lyrics for at least two songs, "Flirty" and "It Would Only Hurt Me If I Knew". From 1947 to 1951, he earned some money writing book reviews but spent most of his time working on Invisible Man. Fanny also helped type Ellison's longhand text and assisted him in editing the typescript as it progressed.

Published in 1952, Invisible Man explores the theme of a person's search for their identity and place in society, as seen from the perspective of the first-person narrator, an unnamed African-American man, first in the Deep South and then in the New York City of the 1930s. In contrast to his contemporaries such as Richard Wright and James Baldwin, Ellison created characters that are dispassionate, educated, articulate, and self-aware. Through the protagonist, Ellison explores the contrasts between the Northern and Southern varieties of racism and their alienating effect. The narrator is "invisible" in a figurative sense, in that "people refuse to see" him, and also experiences a kind of dissociation. The novel also contains stories about hard-bitten subjects like incest and communism.

== Later years ==
In 1962, the futurist Herman Kahn recruited Ellison as a consultant to the Hudson Institute in an attempt to broaden its scope beyond defense-related research.

In 1964, Ellison published Shadow and Act, a collection of essays, and began to teach at Bard College, Rutgers University and Yale University, while continuing to work on his novel. The following year, a Book Week poll of 200 critics, authors, and editors was released that proclaimed Invisible Man the most important novel since World War II.

In 1967, Ellison experienced a major house fire at his summer home in Plainfield, Massachusetts, in which he claimed more than 300 pages of his second novel manuscript were lost. A perfectionist regarding the art of the novel, Ellison had said in accepting his National Book Award for Invisible Man that he felt he had made "an attempt at a major novel" and, despite the award, he was unsatisfied with the book. Ellison ultimately wrote more than 2,000 pages of this second novel but never finished it.

Ellison died on April 16, 1994, of pancreatic cancer and was interred in a crypt at Trinity Church Cemetery and Mausoleum in the Hamilton Heights neighborhood of Upper Manhattan.

== Awards and recognition ==
External videos
- Panel discussion on the writings of Ralph Ellison, December 5, 1996, C-SPAN

Invisible Man won the 1953 US National Book Award for Fiction.

The award was his ticket into the American literary establishment. He eventually was admitted to the American Academy of Arts and Letters, received two President's Medals (from Lyndon Johnson and Ronald Reagan) and a State Medal from France. He was the first African-American admitted to the Century Association and was awarded an honorary Doctorate from Harvard University. Disillusioned by his experience with the Communist Party, he used his new fame to speak out for literature as a moral instrument. In 1955 he traveled to Europe, visiting and lecturing, settling for a time in Rome, where he wrote an essay that appeared in a 1957 Bantam anthology called A New Southern Harvest. Robert Penn Warren was in Rome during the same period, and the two writers became close friends. Later, Warren would interview Ellison about his thoughts on race, history, and the Civil Rights Movement for his book Who Speaks for the Negro? In 1958, Ellison returned to the United States to take a position teaching American and Russian literature at Bard College and to begin a second novel, Juneteenth. During the 1950s, he corresponded with his lifelong friend, the writer Albert Murray. In their letters they commented on the development of their careers, the Civil Rights Movement, and other common interests including jazz. Much of this material was published in the collection Trading Twelves (2000).

Writing essays about both the black experience and his love for jazz music, Ellison continued to receive major awards for his work. In 1969, he received the Presidential Medal of Freedom; the following year, he was made a Chevalier of the Ordre des Arts et des Lettres by France and became a permanent member of the faculty at New York University as the Albert Schweitzer Professor of Humanities, serving from 1970 to 1980.

In 1975, Ellison was elected to the American Academy of Arts and Letters, and his hometown of Oklahoma City honored him with the dedication of the Ralph Waldo Ellison Library. Continuing to teach, Ellison published mostly essays, and in 1984, he received the New York City College's Langston Hughes Medal. In 1985, he was awarded the National Medal of Arts. In 1986, his Going to the Territory was published; this is a collection of seventeen essays that included insight into southern novelist William Faulkner and Ellison's friend Richard Wright, as well as the music of Duke Ellington and the contributions of African Americans to America's national identity.

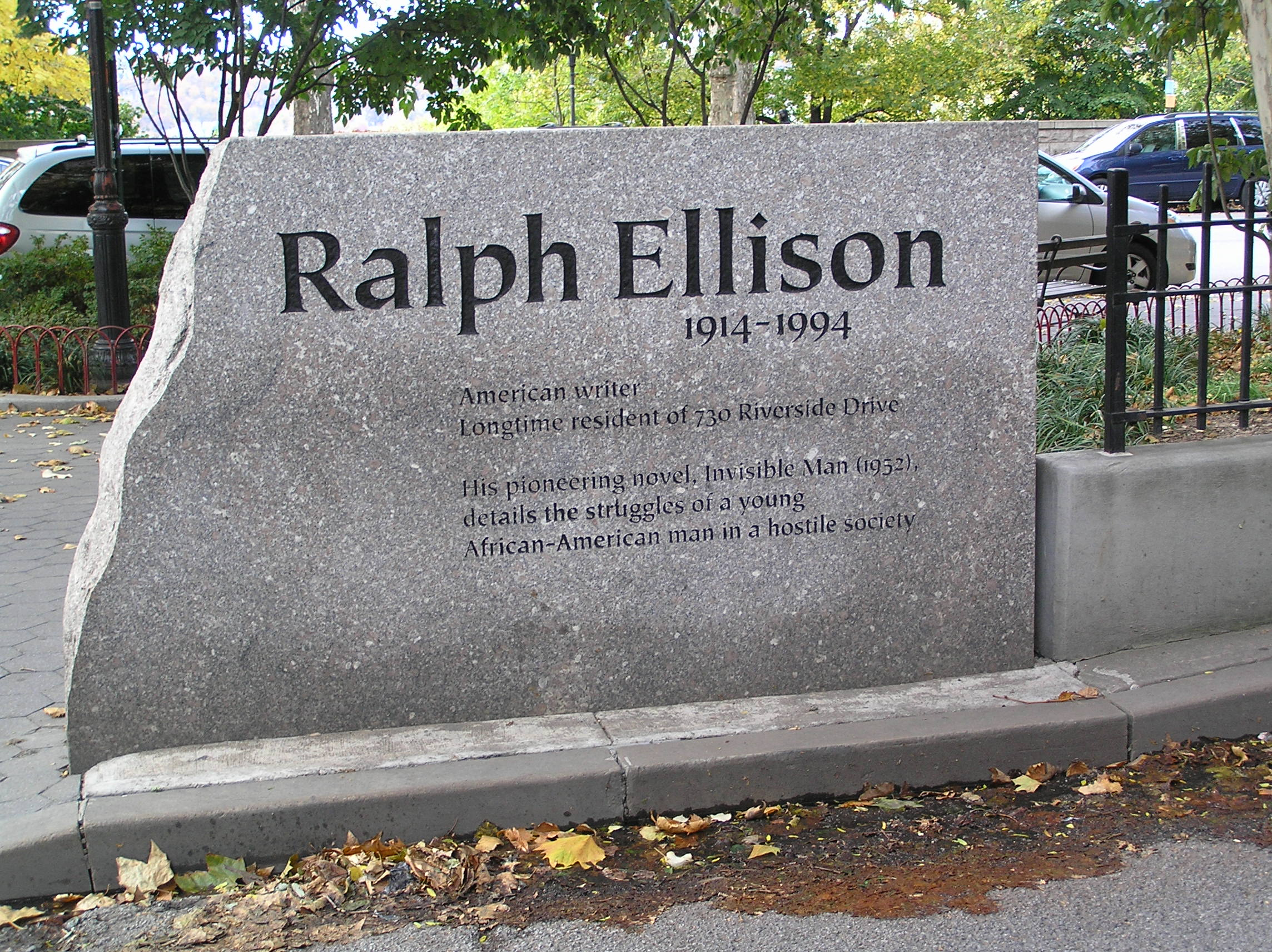
Ralph Ellison monument in front of 730 Riverside Drive, New York City. The birthyear is the incorrect year Ellison would usually offer

In 1992, Ellison was awarded a special achievement award from the Anisfield-Wolf Book Awards; his artistic achievements included work as a sculptor, musician, photographer, and college professor as well as his writing output. He taught at Bard College, Rutgers University, the University of Chicago, and New York University. Ellison was also a charter member of the Fellowship of Southern Writers.

== Legacy and posthumous publications ==
After Ellison's death, more manuscripts were discovered in his home, resulting in the publication of Flying Home and Other Stories in 1996. In 1999, his second novel, Juneteenth, was published under the editorship of John F. Callahan, a professor at Lewis & Clark College and Ellison's literary executor. It was a 368-page condensation of more than 2,000 pages written by Ellison over a period of 40 years. All the manuscripts of this incomplete novel were published collectively on January 26, 2010, by Modern Library, under the title Three Days Before the Shooting...

Throughout his life, Ralph Ellison was a prolific letter writer, and as scholar Clark Barwick argues, Ellison’s letter writing is its own literary achievement that continues to grow as new letters are discovered and analyzed. Since Ellison’s death, two posthumous collections of his letters have been published, The Selected Letters of Ralph Ellison (edited by John F. Callahan and Marc C. Conner, 2019) and Trading Twelves: The Selected Letters of Ralph Ellison and Albert Murray (edited by Albert Murray and John F. Callahan, 2000). Hundreds of Ellison’s letters are publicly available at the Library of Congress and in university archives across the United States.

On February 18, 2014, the USPS issued a 91¢ stamp honoring Ralph Ellison in its Literary Arts series.

A park on 150th Street and Riverside Drive in Harlem (near 730 Riverside Drive, Ellison's principal residence from the early 1950s until his death) was dedicated to Ellison on May 1, 2003. In the park stands a 15 by 8-foot bronze slab with a "cut-out man figure" inspired by his book Invisible Man.

Bard College announced the creation of the Ralph Ellison Center in September of 2026, through an agreement with the Ralph and Fanny Ellison Charitable Trust, which has transferred all rights and royalties to the college. The Ellison Center plans a biannual lecture center, digitization of Ellison's archives, student internships and other activities.

== Bibliography ==
External videos
- Presentation by John Callahan on Juneteenth, June 30, 1999, C-SPAN
- Discussion with Adam Bradley on Three Days Before the Shooting..., March 28, 2008, C-SPAN
- Presentation by John Callahan and Adam Bradley on Three Days Before the Shooting..., February 3, 2010, C-SPAN

- Invisible Man (Random House, 1952). ISBN 0679601392
- Flying Home and Other Stories (Random House, 1996). ISBN 0679457046; includes the short story "A Party Down at the Square"
- Juneteenth (Random House, 1999). ISBN 0394464575
- Three Days Before the Shooting... (Modern Library, 2010). ISBN 978-0375759536

=== Essay collections ===
- Shadow and Act (Random House, 1964). ISBN 0679760008
- Going to the Territory (Random House, 1986). ISBN 0394540506
- The Collected Essays of Ralph Ellison (Modern Library, 1995). ISBN 0679601767
- Living with Music: Ralph Ellison's Jazz Writings (Modern Library, 2001). ISBN 0375760237

=== Letters ===
- The Selected Letters of Ralph Ellison. Eds. John F Callahan and Marc C. Conner (Random House, 2019). ISBN 978-0812998528
- Trading Twelves: The Selected Letters of Ralph Ellison and Albert Murray (Modern Library, 2000). ISBN 0375503676

== See also ==
- 1953 in literature
