= Arnold Rampersad =

Biographer, literary critic, and academic (born 1941)

- Born: 13 November 1941 (age 84); Trinidad and Tobago
- Education: Bowling Green State University (BA, MA); Harvard University (PhD)
- Occupations: Biographer, literary critic, academic
- Notable work: The Life of Langston Hughes (1986); Ralph Ellison: A Biography (2007)
- Relatives: Roger Toussaint (half-brother)
- Awards: National Humanities Medal (2010); Anisfield-Wolf Lifetime Achievement Award (2012)

Arnold Rampersad (born 13 November 1941) is a biographer, literary critic, and academic, who was born in Trinidad and Tobago and moved to the US in 1965. The second volume (1989) of his Life of Langston Hughes was a finalist for the Pulitzer Prize for Biography and Ralph Ellison: A Biography was a finalist for the 2007 National Book Award for Nonfiction.

Rampersad is currently Professor of English and the Sara Hart Kimball Professor in the Humanities at Stanford University. He was Senior Associate Dean for the Humanities from January 2004 to August 2006.

== Background and career ==
Rampersad was born in Trinidad and Tobago. His estranged father was journalist Jerome Ewart Rampersad (born Geronimo Ewart Hernandez), who was assumed to have written the famed "In the Courts Today" column in the Evening News under the pseudonym "McGee" and was a contemporary and colleague of Seepersad Naipaul, father of Nobel Prize winner V. S. Naipaul. His father was born to Christopher Rampersad, a Presbyterian Indian, and Romana Hernandez, a Roman Catholic of Venezuelan Mulatto descent.

Rampersad moved to the US in 1965. He graduated from Bowling Green State University with a bachelor's degree and master's degree in English (1967 and 1968). In 1973, he earned a Ph.D from Harvard University, his dissertation being subsequently published as the intellectual biography The Art and Imagination of W. E. B. Du Bois.

He was a member of the Stanford University English Department from 1974 to 1983, before accepting a position at Rutgers University. Since then he taught there and at Columbia and Princeton, before returning to Stanford in 1998.

Rampersad's teaching covers such areas as 19th- and 20th-century American literature; the literature of the American South; American and African American autobiography; race and American literature; and the Harlem Renaissance.

His published books include biographical works on W. E. B. Du Bois, Langston Hughes, Arthur Ashe, Jackie Robinson, Ralph Ellison, as well as edited volumes of writings by Richard Wright.

== Honours ==
From 1991 to 1996, Rampersad held a MacArthur "Genius Grant" fellowship. He is an elected member of the American Academy of Arts and Sciences and of the American Philosophical Society.

In 2007, his biography of Ralph Ellison (1914–1994), on which he had worked for eight years, was a nonfiction finalist for the National Book Award for Nonfiction.

In 2010, Rampersad was awarded the National Humanities Medal, and in 2012 was the recipient of the BIO Award from Biographers International Organization. Also in 2012, he won a Lifetime Achievement Prize from the Anisfield-Wolf Book Awards.

== Personal life ==
Rampersad is the half-brother of Roger Toussaint, the president of Transport Workers Union Local 100.

== Books ==
=== Biography ===
- The Art and Imagination of W. E. B. Du Bois (Harvard University Press, 1976)
- The Life of Langston Hughes, Vols. I and II (Oxford University Press, 1986 and 1988)
- Jackie Robinson: A Biography (Knopf, 1997)
- Ralph Ellison: A Biography (Knopf, 2007)

=== Memoir ===
- Days of Grace: A Memoir (Knopf, 1993), co-authored with Arthur Ashe

=== Edited work ===
- Collected Poems of Langston Hughes
- The Library of America edition (2 vols) of works by Richard Wright, including revised individual editions of Native Son and Black Boy
- Slavery and the Literary Imagination (as co-author)
- Race and American Culture (co-editor with Shelley Fisher Fishkin) – in the book series published by Oxford University Press
- Poetry for Young People: Langston Hughes (co-editor with David Roessel) (Sterling Publishing Co., Inc., 2006)
