= Ethel Caution-Davis =

American poet

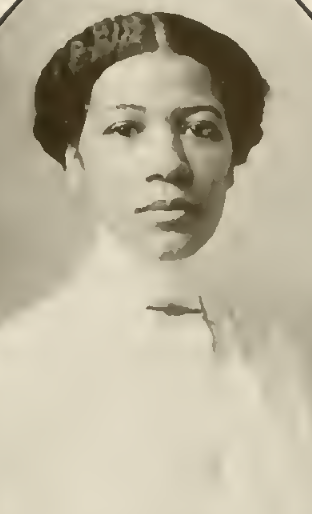
- Ethel M. Caution-Davis, from the 1912 yearbook of Wellesley College
- Born: Ethel M. Caution; April 18, 1887; Williamsport, Pennsylvania, U.S.
- Died: December 18, 1981 (age 94); New York, New York, U.S.
- Other name: Ethel M. Davis
- Occupations: Poet, educator, social worker
- Relatives: Julia C. Collins (grandmother); Frank A. Young (sportswriter)(brother); Sinah Estelle Kelley (niece)

Ethel May Caution-Davis (April 18, 1887 – December 18, 1981) was an American poet, social worker, and educator associated with the Harlem Renaissance. She was one of the first Black graduates of Girls Latin School in Boston in 1908, and of Wellesley College in 1912. She was dean of women at Talladega College in the 1920s.

== Early life and education ==
Caution was born and raised in Williamsport, Pennsylvania, the daughter of John Lake Caution Sr. and Annie Collins Caution. Her mother was a seamstress and her father worked at a sawmill. Her grandmother, Julia C. Collins, was a teacher and the author of a published novel, The Curse of Caste, or, The Slave Bride (1865). Both of her parents died when she was a small child; she moved to Massachusetts to be raised by relatives there, but after another death, Caution and her siblings were surrendered to an orphanage. Caution was adopted by a widow, Mary M. Davis.

In 1908, Caution-Davis was one of the first Black children enrolled at Girls Latin School in Boston. She graduated from Wellesley College in 1912, where she was recognized as a strong athlete. She later spent a summer studying in Paris, and earned a master's degree at Columbia University in 1928.

Her brother John changed his name and was a noted sportwriter, Frank A. Young. Chemist Sinah Estelle Kelley was Caution-Davis's niece.

== Career ==
Caution-Davis worked as a waitress in her teens. After college, she taught school in Kansas City, Kansas, from 1914 to 1917, was a YWCA executive secretary in Los Angeles from 1919 to 1921, and was dean of women at Talladega College in the early 1920s. She was a caseworker for the New York City Department of Welfare, and director of "Club Caroline", a housing program for Black girls, later in the 1920s. She was active in the NAACP chapter in Kansas City in 1916.

== Works ==
Caution-Davis published her first poems and stories in the Wellesley Magazine and Wellesley News. Her stories and poems also appeared in The Crisis and in anthologies, usually in collections of African-American women's writings.

- "In '61" (1911, short story)
- "A Worthy Cause" (1913, short essay)
- "Polly Sits Tight" (short story)
- "A Man" (1916, poem)
- "Buyers of Dreams" (1921, short story)
- "To..." (1927, poem)
- "Long Remembering" (1928, poem)
- The Drop Sinister (1928, play)
- "Shopping" (1929, poem)
- "Last Night" (1929, poem)
- "Sunset" (1929, poem)

== Personal life ==
Caution-Davis was blind in her later years. She died in 1981, in New York City, probably in her 90s.
