= Frank A. Young (sportswriter) =

American journalist

Frank Albert Young
- Born: John Lake Caution Jr. October 19, 1884; Williamsport, Pennsylvania, U.S.
- Died: October 27, 1957 (aged 73); Chicago, Illinois, U.S.
- Other name: Fay Young
- Occupations: Journalist, sportswriter
- Notable credit: The Chicago Defender
- Spouses: Adaline Harrison (m. 1906, div.); Cora Bowman (m. 1918)
- Children: Frank Albert Young Jr.; Louise Anna Young
- Relatives: Julia C. Collins (grandmother); Ethel Caution-Davis (sister)

Frank Albert Young (born John Lake Caution Jr.; October 19, 1884 – October 27, 1957) was an American journalist who wrote for many years for The Chicago Defender. Also known as Fay Young, he was widely regarded as the "dean of Negro sportswriters."

== Early life ==
Frank Albert Young was born John Lake Caution, Jr. on October 19, 1884, in Williamsport, Pennsylvania, the eldest of four children of John Lake Caution and Annie C. (née Collins) Caution. The elder Caution, descended from Haitian immigrants, was originally from Washington County, Maryland, and worked in a lumber mill in Williamsport. Annie Caution's mother was Julia C. Collins, who in 1865, produced the first serialized novel written by an African-American woman, Curse of Caste, or the Slave Bride The family lived at 342 Front Street in Williamsport.

In November 1889, Annie Collins Caution died of pneumonia at the age of twenty-seven, leaving four young children aged between one and five. In June 1892, John Caution was fatally injured at an accident at the mill where he worked. Orphaned, the four children were taken to Cambridge, Massachusetts by their father's brother and sister-in-law, Cornelius and Ella (Blake) Caution; upon her death seven months later, all four were placed in a local orphanage. The two eldest, John Lake and Belva Lockwood Caution, were adopted by an African-American couple, William F. and Margaret E. (Green) Overton, of West Medford, Massachusetts where they lived until 1900 when John, known as John Overton, ran away from home, changing his name to Frank Albert Young.

Under that name he worked at a number of jobs until he got work as a Pullman porter. By 1905, he was working as a dining car waiter for the Chicago and Northern Railway when he married eighteen-year-old Adaline Harrison in Chicago; they had two children, a son and a daughter. The marriage was not successful, and in 1918, he married native Chicagoan Cora K. Bowman (1893–1960), who survived him.

== Career ==
Around 1910, Young contacted J. Hockley Smiley, managing editor of the Chicago Defender newspaper as to the possibilities of a job as a reporter. Smiley told him that there were no jobs available, but anything Young could contribute on a free-lance basis would be greatly appreciated. Young started contributing pieces to both the Chicago Defender and the Indianapolis Recorder, another black-owned newspaper and, by 1912, was taken on as a sportswriter (again free-lance) by the Chicago Defender.

In 1914, Young joined the staff of the Defender and the next year became managing editor until 1918. He developed the first weekly black sports section, serving as sports editor from 1918 to 1929. Young was also the first sportswriter to regularly cover sports at historically black colleges. He also served as managing editor of the Defender from 1929 to 1934, followed by a stint as managing editor of the Kansas City Call from 1934 to 1937. Young then returned to the Defender where he continued to write until his retirement in 1949, although he continued to produce his weekly column, "Fay Says" until his death.

He helped organize the Negro National League in 1920, and served as statistician until the league disbanded in 1933. He also served as an official for the Illinois Athletic Commission, serving as a timekeeper at prizefights; he was also a former secretary of the Negro American League.

=== Death ===
Young died in 1957 of an intestinal obstruction at his home in Chicago shortly after receiving news that his sister Belva Overton had died in New York. Funeral services were held at Everybody's Church, a nondenominational church that he had helped establish at 60th Street and Wabash Avenue on the south side of Chicago. His pallbearers included Jesse Owens, Ralph Metcalfe, and John Sengstacke, owner and publisher of the Defender. He was buried at Mount Glenwood Cemetery in Thornton, Illinois.

=== Legacy ===
Considered the "Dean" of black sportswriters, Fay Young wrote about the African American influence on American sport. He supported Jack Johnson as he tried to return to boxing after serving his prison sentence, and was actively involved in promoting the inclusion of African Americans into professional sport during the early years of the twentieth century; he was also a staunch and unwavering supporter of black collegiate sports, as well as encouraging the involvement of African Americans in such sports as tennis, golf, and auto racing.

Young influenced a whole generation of black sportswriters. One was A.S. (Doc) Young (no relation), who in a 1970 article in Ebony Magazine said, "I listened to Fay Young and learned a great deal from him." Another was Russ J. Cowans who succeeded him as sports editor at the Defender.

The Frank A. Young Poultry Plant at Tennessee State University was named in his honor.
