= Transatlanticism (disambiguation) =

Transatlanticism may refer to:

- Transatlanticism (album), 2003 album by Death Cab for Cutie
- Transatlanticism (culture), the cultural exchange between Great Britain and the United States, as reflected in British and American literature
- Transatlanticism, or Atlanticism, the belief in or support for strong relations between North America and Europe
- Transatlantic relations
