= Transatlanticism (culture) =

Aspect of British and American culture

Transatlanticism is an aspect of the relationship of British and American culture explored by some writers in American literature and British literature. Although the academic discipline of transatlantic studies is a critical framework originating the 2000s, it has been argued that transatlanticism itself is in itself a very old phenomenon, and that transatlanticism shows the tension in nineteenth-century America between emphasizing the British dimensions of American culture and asserting the independence of American culture. Within this area of literary studies is depiction of "white America's status as both colonial subject and colonial power".

Examples of translatlanticism among authors include 19th Century American writers such as Hannah Crafts who treats both American and British variants of the injustice of slavery in The Bondwoman's Narrative. As well as 20th Century authors such as Sylvia Plath for whom it has been seen as the "negotiation of American and European identities in conflict". as well as cross-national poets such as T.S. Eliot

Transatlanticism in literature and culture should be distinguished from transatlanticism in international relations and politics.
