= Moral =

Message that is conveyed or lesson to be learned from a story or event

A moral (from Latin morālis) is a message that is conveyed or a lesson to be learned from a story or event. The moral may be left to the hearer, reader, or viewer to determine for themselves, or may be explicitly encapsulated in a maxim. A moral is a lesson in a story or real life.

== Finding morals ==
As an example of an explicit maxim, at the end of Aesop's fable of the Tortoise and the Hare, in which the plodding and determined tortoise won a race against the much-faster yet extremely arrogant hare, the stated moral is "slow and steady wins the race". However, other morals can often be taken from the story itself; for instance, that arrogance or overconfidence in one's abilities may lead to failure or the loss of an event, race, or contest.

The use of stock characters is a means of conveying the moral of the story by eliminating the complexity of personality and depicting the issues arising in the interplay between the characters, enabling the writer to generate a clear message. With more rounded characters, such as those typically found in Shakespeare's plays, the moral may be more nuanced but no less present, and the writer may point it out in other ways (see, for example, the Prologue to Romeo and Juliet).

=== Arts ===
Throughout the history of recorded literature, most fictional writing has served not only to entertain but also to instruct, inform, or improve their audiences or readership. In classical drama, for example, the role of the chorus was to comment on the proceedings and draw out a message for the audience to take away with them. At the same time, the novels of Charles Dickens are a vehicle for morals regarding the social and economic system of Victorian Britain.

Morals have typically been more obvious in children's literature, sometimes even being introduced with the phrase: "moral of the story is …". Such explicit techniques have grown increasingly out of fashion in modern storytelling, and are now usually only included for ironic purposes.

Some examples are: "Better to be safe than sorry" (precautionary principle), "The evil deserves no aid", "Be friends with whom you don't like", "Don't judge people by the way they look", "Slow and steady wins the race", "Once started down the dark path, forever will it hold your destiny", and "Your overconfidence is your weakness". Aesop's Fables is one of the most famous collections of stories with strong moral conclusions.

=== Moral tales ===
Moral tales were one of the main purposes of literature during 1780–1830, especially in children's literature. Part of the reason for this was the writings of John Locke and Jean-Jacques Rousseau in the 18th century, which brought attention to children as an audience for literature. Following in their line of thought, Thomas Day (1748–1789) wrote Sandford and Merton, elevating the outstanding morals of one young boy above the rapscallion nature of another. Maria Edgeworth (1776–1849) was another prominent author of moral tales, writing about how a wise adult can educate a child; one of her more famous stories is "The Purple Jar". During this time, the theme of "a young heroine or hero gaining wisdom and maturity" was taken up by many other writers.

The ability of children to derive moral lessons from stories and visual media develops around the age of 9 or 10 years.

Research in developmental psychology has shown that children’s ability to understand and apply moral lessons from stories typically begins to develop between the ages of 9 and 10, as they become more capable of abstract thinking.

In more recent children's literature, moral lessons continue to be conveyed through fantasy and adventure stories. For example, in J.K. Rowling's Harry Potter series, themes of friendship, courage, and standing up for what is right are central moral messages that resonate with young readers.

== See also ==
- Allegory
- Morality play
