= Hannah Crafts =

19th-century American writer and escaped slave

Hannah Bond, also known by her pen name Hannah Crafts (born c. 1830s), was an American writer who escaped from slavery in North Carolina about 1857 and went to the North. Some biographers speculate Bond settled in New Jersey, and may have married Thomas Vincent, and became a teacher. She wrote The Bondwoman's Narrative by Hannah Crafts after gaining freedom. It is the only known novel by an enslaved woman.

Written between 1853 and 1861, the novel was published in 2002 for the first time after Henry Louis Gates Jr., a Harvard University professor of African-American literature and history, purchased the manuscript and had it authenticated. It rapidly became a bestseller.

Bond's identity was documented in 2013 by Gregg Hecimovich of Furman University, who found that she had been owned by John Hill Wheeler of Murfreesboro, North Carolina. He had identified many details of her life. Gates and other major scholars have supported his conclusions.

== Life ==
Hannah Bond, according to Gregg Hecimovich of Furman University, was born enslaved in Bertie County, North Carolina, first as the property of Lewis Bond, before she was acquired by Wheeler. As the lady's maid for Wheeler's wife, Bond learned to read and write. Her novel reveals close knowledge of the Wheeler household and Wheeler's tenure as US Minister to Nicaragua. She quotes liberally from 19th-century novels by prominent authors found to have been part of Wheeler's extensive library.

About 1857, Bond took to disguising in men's clothes (perhaps helped by someone in the Wheeler family), and escaped from the plantation, traveling as a white boy. She reached freedom in the North, living for a time in upstate New York with a couple named Crafts. She apparently took their surname as her pseudonym. Later she settled in New Jersey, according to Hecimovich, where she married and became a school teacher.

External videos
- Washington Journal interview with Henry Louis Gates on The Bondswoman's Narrative, April 18, 2002, C-SPAN

Bond wrote the novel, The Bondwoman's Narrative by Hannah Crafts, Fugitive Slave from North Carolina, a fictional slave narrative, recounting the experiences of a young mixed-race woman slave who escapes to the North and gains freedom. Her manuscript was found years later in a New Jersey attic and held privately for some time. In 2001 it was purchased at auction by Henry Louis Gates Jr., a professor of African-American literature and culture at Harvard University. He had the manuscript authenticated and arranged for its publication in 2002.

Most literary scholars had believed, prior to Gregg Hecimovich's discovery, that the name "Hannah Crafts" was a pseudonym, and had considered the work to be a fictionalized autobiography. From her writing, Crafts appears to have been self-taught. References in the work suggest that she may have been born in the 1830s.

The paper of the manuscript is a distinct one, identified by historians as from the library of North Carolina planter and slaveholder John H. Wheeler. This was part of the evidence found by Hecimovich that confirmed "Hannah Crafts" had lived at the Wheeler plantation. Bond apparently was able to read and to use the library, as her novel shows influences from other literature; she reflects elements of Jane Eyre by Charlotte Brontë and Rob Roy by Sir Walter Scott. Hecimovich used "wills, diaries, handwritten almanacs and public records" and interviews to discover and document the life of Hannah Bond, and confirm her identity. Scholars familiar with the novel and the period, such as Gates, Hollis Robbins, and William L. Andrews, believe that he has demonstrated an accounting of her identity.

Hecimovich learned that girls from a nearby school often boarded at the plantation; part of their curriculum required memorizing Charles Dickens' Bleak House, which influences Bond also expressed in her novel. She may have heard the girls reading aloud, or read the book herself. It was serialized in Frederick Douglass's newspaper, which had wide circulation among fugitive slaves.

Other scholars, including investigator Joe Nickell, who authenticated the manuscript, had previously tied Crafts to John H. Wheeler. She had accurately described him as the US Minister to Nicaragua and his duties, as shown by his own diary. Believing that the novel was autobiographical, scholars speculated from its plot that Crafts had married a Methodist minister and lived in New Jersey. Her married name may have been Hannah Vincent, the wife of Thomas Vincent, as they were both listed in the census records of New Jersey in 1870 and 1880. It is unlikely that this Hannah Vincent is her, however, as the same woman appears in the census, married to Thomas Vincent (with the same son) in the 1850 census records and other documents well before Hannah Bond would have arrived in New Jersey.

== Background of book ==
Research suggests the book was written some time between 1855 and 1869. For instance, the book shows knowledge of and adaptation from Dickens' novel Bleak House (1853). The surname Crafts, her pen name, was at one time thought to be a tribute to the slaves Ellen and William Craft, whose bold escape in 1848 was covered by the national press. Hecimovich believes it is more likely Hannah took this name after living with a Crafts couple in upstate New York in her early time after reaching the North by the Underground Railroad. Most scholars believe the manuscript was written before the American Civil War. They think Bond would have referred to the war if she had been writing her work during or after it. She referred to other contemporary events, as well as creating fictional ones.

== Awards and honors ==
On January 14, 2026, the state of North Carolina recognized Hannah Crafts with a Highway Historical Marker.

== See also ==
- Harriet Wilson
- Our Nig
- William Wells Brown
- List of enslaved people
