= Hollis Robbins =

American academic

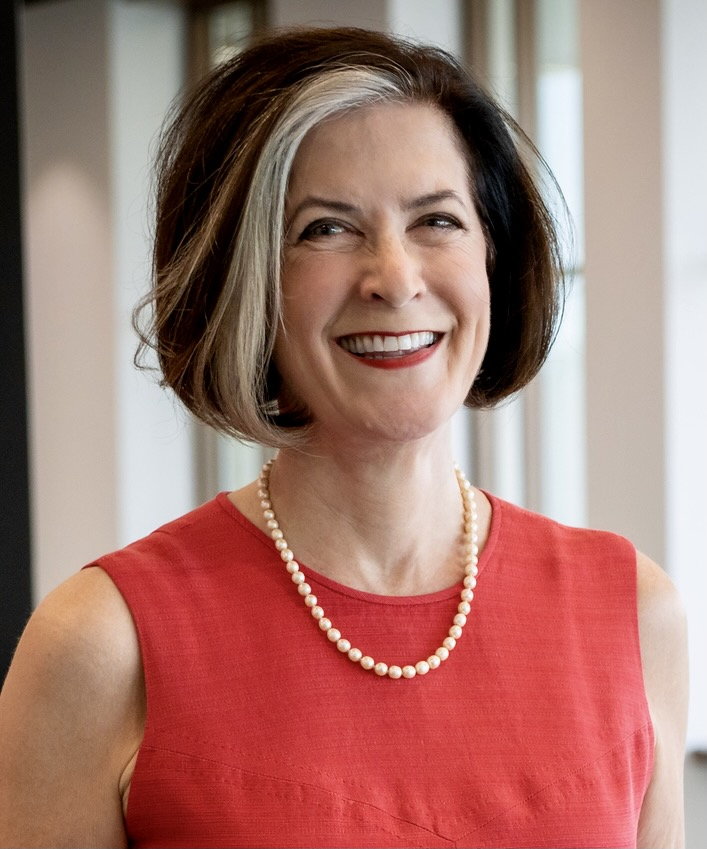
- Robbins in 2022
- Born: 1963 (age 62–63); New Hampshire, U.S.

Academic background
- Education: Johns Hopkins University (BA); Harvard University (MPP); University of Colorado Boulder (MA); Princeton University (PhD)

Academic work
- Institutions: Millsaps College; Johns Hopkins University; Sonoma State University University of Utah
- Writing career
- Occupations: Dean; Lecturer; literary editor; literary theorist; poet; essayist
- Language: English

Hollis Robbins (born 1963) is an American academic and essayist. Robbins is professor of English and also serves as Special Advisor for Humanities at the University of Utah; she was formerly dean of humanities. Her scholarship focuses on African-American literature and her essays focus on higher education, artificial intelligence (AI), and aphantasia.

== Education and early career ==
Robbins was born and raised in New Hampshire. She is Jewish. Her father's family were from Latvia and Lithuania. On her mother's side she is descended from Isaac Shelby, first governor of Kentucky. Her great-great uncle is Hugh Campbell Wallace, Ambassador to France under Woodrow Wilson. Another great uncle is the explorer and publisher William LaVarre.

Robbins entered Johns Hopkins University at the age of 16, where she studied with Richard Macksey and Julian Stanley. She received her B.A. in 1983. From 1986 to 1988 Robbins worked at The New Yorker magazine in the marketing and promotions department. She received a master's degree in public policy from Harvard's Kennedy School of Government in 1990, and subsequently enrolled as a doctoral student in the department of communication at Stanford University in 1991.

After working in politics and public policy in California and Colorado, Robbins pursued an M.A. in English literature from the University of Colorado Boulder in 1998, and a Ph.D. from Princeton University in 2003, where her dissertation focused on the literary representations of bureaucracy in 19th-century British and American literature.

== Academic career ==
After receiving her Ph.D., from 2004 to 2006, Robbins was an assistant professor of English at Millsaps College in Jackson, Mississippi. In 2004 she also became co-director with Henry Louis Gates, Jr. of the Black Periodical Literature Project at Harvard’s Hutchins Center for African and African American Research. From 2006 to 2017 Robbins was a faculty member and then chair of the department of humanities at the Peabody Institute of Johns Hopkins University where she taught a class in film music with Thomas Dolby. Robbins was the director of the Center for Africana Studies at Johns Hopkins, from 2014 to 2017. From 2014 to 2018, she served on the faculty editorial board of the Johns Hopkins University Press and from 2011 to 2017 served on the board of the $400M Johns Hopkins Federal Credit Union. She won the 2014 Johns Hopkins University Alumni Excellence in Teaching Award, a 2015 Johns Hopkins University Discovery Award, and a 2017–2018 fellowship from the National Humanities Center.

Robbins became dean of humanities at the University of Utah on July 1, 2022. Previously, from 2018 to 2022, she was dean of the school of arts and humanities at Sonoma State University in Rohnert Park, California. Her research focuses on African American history and literature. In 2004, she began collaborating with Henry Louis Gates Jr. and co-edited In Search of Hannah Crafts: Essays on The Bondwoman's Narrative (2004). She also co-edited The Annotated 'Uncle Tom's Cabin' (2007) with Gates. She has also written on higher education as well as African American poetry and film music. She is also a published poet.

== Essayist ==
Robbins publishes essays on higher ed (and AI) and book reviews in Inside Higher Ed, The Chronicle of Higher Education, the Los Angeles Review of Books, and other places.

== Selected publications ==
=== As author ===
- — (2003). "The Emperor's New Critique". New Literary History. 34 (4). Johns Hopkins University Press: 659–675. doi:10.1353/nlh.2004.0010. ISSN 1080-661X. OCLC 1296558. S2CID 170513535.
- — (2009). "Fugitive Mail: The Deliverance of Henry 'Box' Brown and Antebellum Postal Politics" (PDF). American Studies. Spring/Summer 2009. 50 (1/2). Mid-America American Studies Association: 5–25. ISSN 0026-3079. OCLC 00818197. Archived from the original on July 18, 2019.
- — (2014). "23. Killing Time: Dracula and Social Discoordination". In Whitman, Glen; Dow, James (eds.). Economics of the Undead: Zombies, Vampires, and the Dismal Science. Lanham: Rowman & Littlefield. pp. 239–248. ISBN 978-1-4422-3503-8. OCLC 1100669007.
- — (2015). "Django Unchained: Repurposing Western Film Music". Safundi. 16 (3). South African and American Studies: 280–290. doi:10.1080/17533171.2015.1057022. ISSN 1753-3171. S2CID 143313188.
- — (2020). Forms of Contention: Influence and the African American sonnet tradition. Athens: University of Georgia Press. ISBN 978-0-8203-5764-5. OCLC 1238066484.

=== As editor ===
- Brown, William Wells (2006). Garrett, Paula; — (eds.). The Works of William Wells Brown: Using his 'strong, manly voice'. New York: Oxford University Press. ISBN 978-0-19-530963-8. OCLC 255507609.
- Gates Jr., Henry Louis; —, eds. (2004). In Search of Hannah Crafts: Essays on The Bondwoman's Narrative. New York: Basic Civitas. ISBN 978-0-465-02714-9. OCLC 1069224792.
- Gates Jr., Henry Louis; —, eds. (2017). The Portable Nineteenth-Century African American Women Writers. New York: Penguin Books. ISBN 9-780-1431-0599-2. OCLC 1003724581.
- Harper, Frances Ellen Watkins (2010). —; Gates Jr., Henry Louis (eds.). Iola Leroy, or, Shadows uplifted. New York: Penguin Classics. ISBN 978-0-14-310604-3. OCLC 430052101. "Introduction by Robbins."
- Stowe, Harriet Beecher (2007). Gates Jr., Henry Louis; — (eds.). The Annotated 'Uncle Tom's Cabin'. New York: W. W. Norton & Company. ISBN 978-0-393-05946-5. OCLC 213048247.

== See also ==
- The Bondwoman's Narrative, the influences of Hannah Crafts
- Commentary on The Emperor's New Clothes by Robbins
- The Hateful Eight
- Henry Box Brown
- "We Are Seven"
- "The Purple Jar"
