= Joe Nickell =

American skeptic and paranormal investigator (1944–2025)

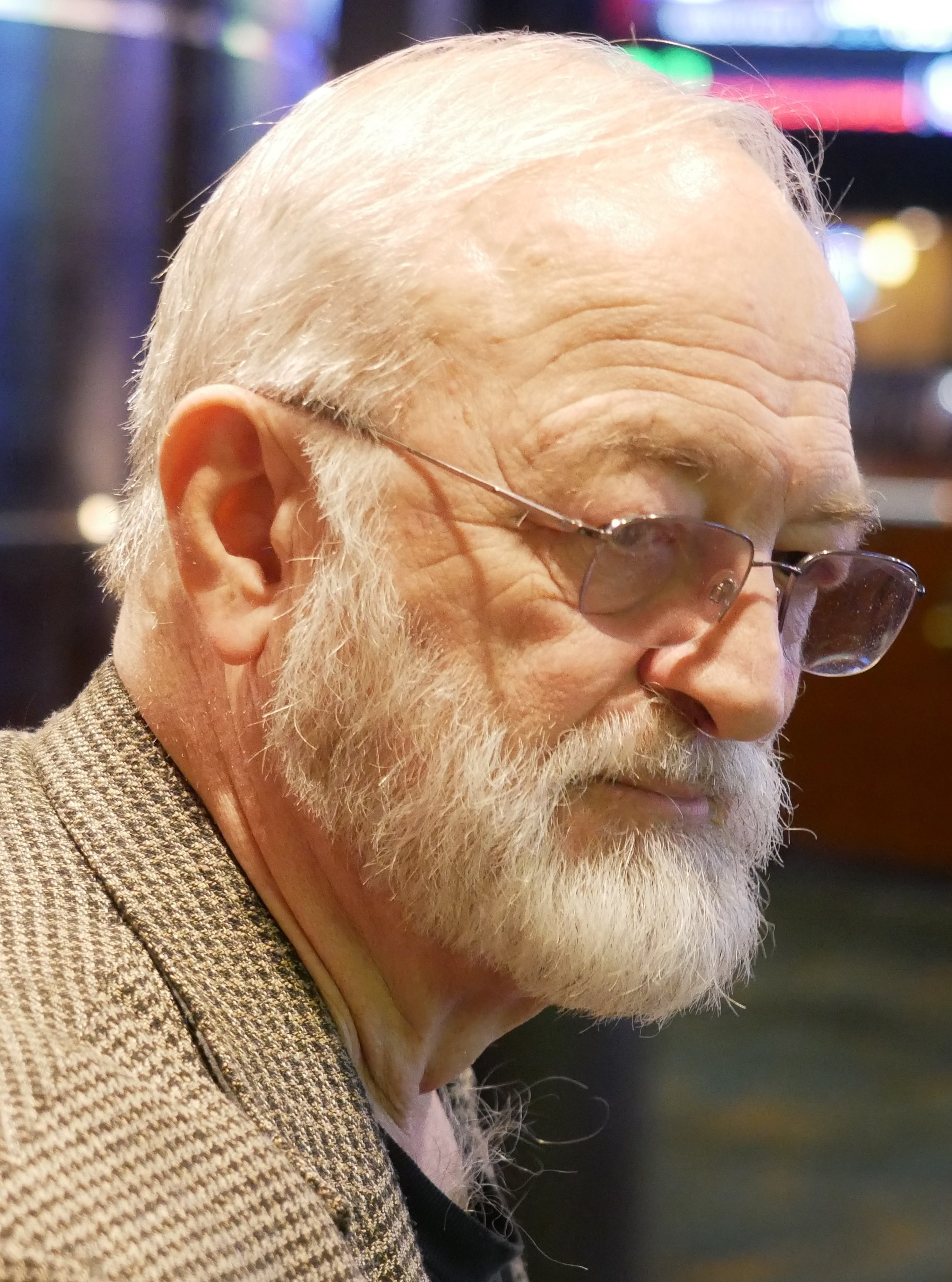
- Nickell in 2018
- Born: Joe Herman Nickell; December 1, 1944; Lexington, Kentucky, U.S.
- Died: March 4, 2025 (aged 80); Buffalo, New York, U.S.
- Education: University of Kentucky (BA, MA, PhD)
- Occupations: Skeptic; investigator; author; editor
- Known for: CSICOP
- Website: joenickell.com at the Wayback Machine (archived October 11, 2025)

Joe Herman Nickell (December 1, 1944 – March 4, 2025) was an American skeptic and investigator of the paranormal.

Nickell was a senior research fellow for the Committee for Skeptical Inquiry and wrote regularly for their journal, Skeptical Inquirer. He was also an associate dean of the Center for Inquiry Institute. He was the author or editor of over 30 books.

Among his career highlights, Nickell helped expose the James Maybrick "Jack the Ripper Diary" as a hoax. In 2002, Nickell was one of a number of experts asked by scholar Henry Louis Gates Jr. to evaluate the authenticity of the manuscript of Hannah Crafts' The Bondwoman's Narrative (1853–1860), possibly the first novel by an African-American woman. At the request of document dealer and historian Seth Keller, Nickell analyzed documentation in the dispute over the authorship of "The Night Before Christmas", ultimately supporting the Clement Clarke Moore claim.

== Early life and education ==
Joe Nickell was the son of J. Wendell and Ella (Turner) Nickell and was born in Lexington, Kentucky on December 1, 1944. He was raised in West Liberty, Kentucky. His parents indulged his interest in magic and investigation, allowing him to use a room in their house as a crime lab.

He earned a B.A. degree in 1967 from the University of Kentucky.

To avoid the wide draft for the Vietnam War, the following year in 1968, at the age of 24, he moved to Canada. There he began his careers as a magician, card dealer, and private investigator. After President Jimmy Carter granted unconditional pardons to draft dodgers in 1977, Nickell returned to the United States.

He returned to the University of Kentucky for graduate work, earning an M.A. (1982) and PhD (1987). His PhD is in English, focusing on literary investigation and folklore.

== Career ==
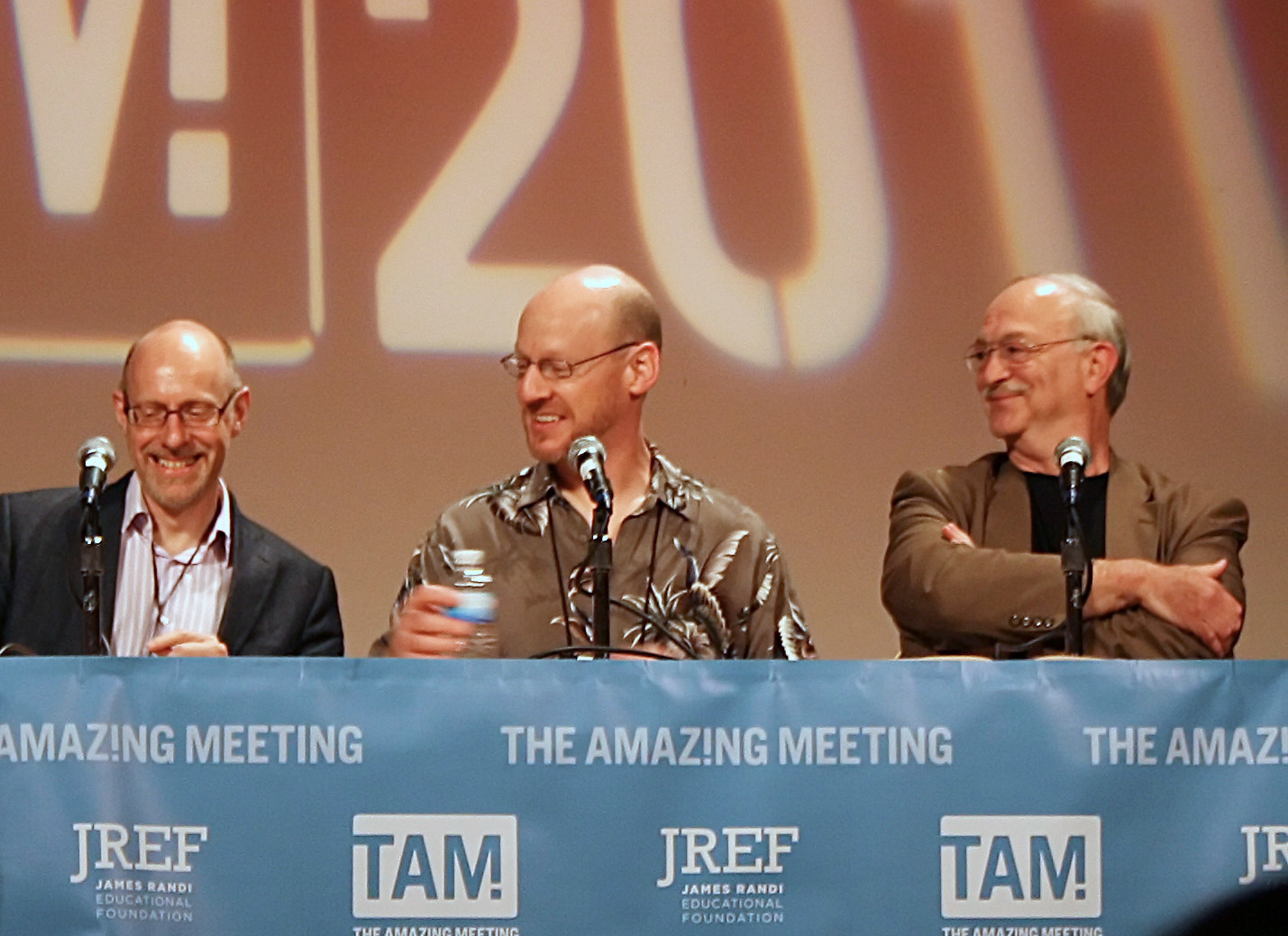
Joe Nickell (right) during TAM9 in 2011, with Richard Wiseman and Phil Plait

Nickell worked professionally as a stage magician, carnival pitchman, private detective, blackjack dealer, riverboat manager, university instructor, author, and paranormal investigator, and he lists more than 1,000 personae on his website. Since the early 1980s, he has researched, written, co-authored, and edited books in many genres.

He was profiled by The New Yorker writer Burkhard Bilger, who met Nickell during the summer of 2002 at Lily Dale, New York. The investigator had disguised himself to investigate Spiritualist psychics.

Nickell was a recurring guest on the Point of Inquiry podcast and conducted the annual Houdini Seance at the Center for Inquiry every Halloween.

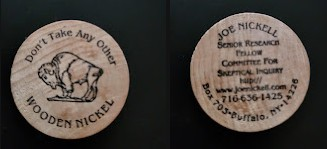
Joe Nickell used a wooden nickel as his business card.

He was frequently consulted by news and television producers for his skeptical perspective.

Nickell explained his philosophy to Blake Smith of the Skeptic podcast MonsterTalk:

I don't like debunkers and I don't like dismissers, people who are just trying to say, "Oh, humbug... Those people were probably drunk or lying or hoaxing." I just think we shouldn't do that. If I'm studying vampires, I don't have to believe they exist to talk about the history of vampires, the cultural and literary history. There are many aspects, all worthy of some scholarly discussion.

He served as a character consultant to Hilary Swank in her starring role in the horror film The Reaping (2007), in which she plays a paranormal investigator.

== Books ==
Nickell's books can be divided into four main categories—religious, forensic, paranormal, and mysteries. He also wrote two books for young readers and two stand-alone books (one on UFOs, one on a regional alcoholic drink), and several additional small press and "contributed to" books.

=== Miracles and religious artifacts ===
Nickell investigated religious artifacts and claimed phenomena. Beginning in 1982 with his book Inquest on the Shroud of Turin: Latest Scientific Findings, Nickell demonstrated his research model of collecting evidence and following that evidence to a sustainable conclusion. He updated the book in 1998 with more recent historical, iconographic, forensic, physical and chemical evidence, with special explanations of the radiocarbon dating process.

In his 1993 book Looking for a Miracle: Weeping Icons, Relics, Stigmata, Visions and Healing Cures, updated in 1998, Nickell analyzes miracles claimed by various religions. For each incident, Nickell reviews the contemporaneous written accounts, explores various natural explanations, explains the cultural environment surrounding the events, and speculates on the motivations of the affected religious community. He concludes that the claimed miracles were either hoaxes or misinterpretations of natural phenomena.

For instance, after studying the weeping St. Irene icon in Queens, New York, Nickell said,

The glistening varnish and certain surface irregularities created a play of light that produced the appearance of weeping. A religious supplicant predisposed to see tears... could, especially if carrying a candle, see in the resultant glimmering in the tiny eyes, aided by vertical cracks and other streaks, the effect of tears.

Relics of the Christ (2007, British edition published as The Jesus Relics: From the Holy Grail to the Turin Shroud), focuses on the Christian tradition of relics. Speaking with D.J. Grothe on the Point of Inquiry podcast, Nickell proposed that veneration of relics had become a new idolatry; that is, worship of an actual deity within the relics in form of an entity that moves its eyes, weeps, bleeds, and walks. He said that although no icon in history has ever been proven authentic in the sense of displaying such attributes, he approaches each case with a suspension of disbelief: "I'm interested in the evidence because I want us to know what the truth is... I urge skeptics... not to be as closed-minded as the other side is ridiculously open-minded."

In 2008, Prometheus Books published John Calvin's Treatise on Relics with an introduction by Nickell. He wrote a brief biography of Calvin and uses references from his own 2007 Relics book.

In his The Science of Miracles: Investigating the Incredible (2013), Nickell applied his investigative technique to 57 reported miracles. From the Virgin Mary's face appearing on a grilled cheese sandwich, to the Cross's regeneration after pieces were removed, to the structural deficiencies of the Loretto Chapel staircase, Nickell's described fact and myth are presented with clarity and respect. The book was criticized in the New York Journal of Books for research limited to non-Biblical sources.

Less satisfying to the reader is the approach taken to miracles described in the Bible. Mr. Nickell focuses on the miracles of Jesus, dismissing them primarily as parables told to make a point that were later converted into miracle stories... Equally dismissive is his approach to glossolalia (speaking in tongues)... he does not bring to bear the available and abundant data that support the reality of this spiritual gift. He also ignores the discussion about glossolalia that can be found in the Apostle Paul's first letter to the Corinthian church (I Corinthians chapters 12 and 14).

=== Forensic investigations ===
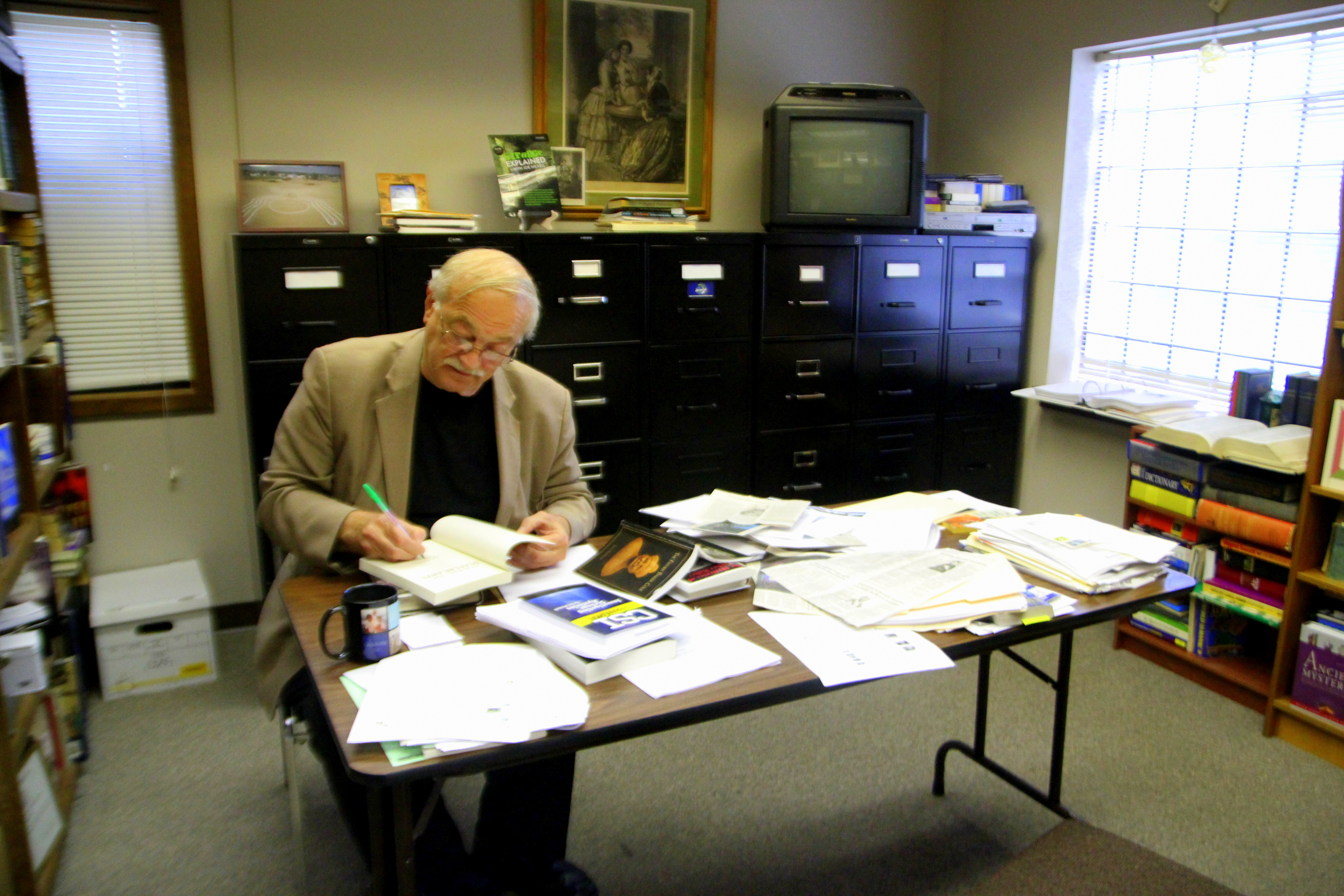
Joe Nickell in his office Amherst, New York, 2013

Nickell's first book in the authentication genre was Pen, Ink, and Evidence: A Study of Writing and Writing Materials for the Penman, Collector, and Document Detective, described as a definitive work for researchers and practitioners. Mary Hood of the Georgia Review praised Nickell's scholarship:

"Enthusiasm" does not quite express Nickell's sober authority of tone; "quiet passion" is more apposite... Both Nickell's interest in the subject and his treatment of it are devout... Although the book contains a useful index for the fact-checker who has no time to saunter, the true and earnest pen collector, paper-freak pilgrim, or office-supply junkie will find that every polished page contains its blessing and bliss.

In Camera Clues: A Handbook for Photographic Investigation, Nickell begins with the history of photography. He presents methods of dating photographs, from the physical characteristics of the work to the subject and contents of the photo. He explains how old photographs can be faked and how those fakes can be detected. He also describes identification of persons and places in old photos and the use of photography by law enforcement. He explains various trick photography techniques, including ghost and spirit photography. These have become even more elaborate with the use of computer images or digital camera technology.

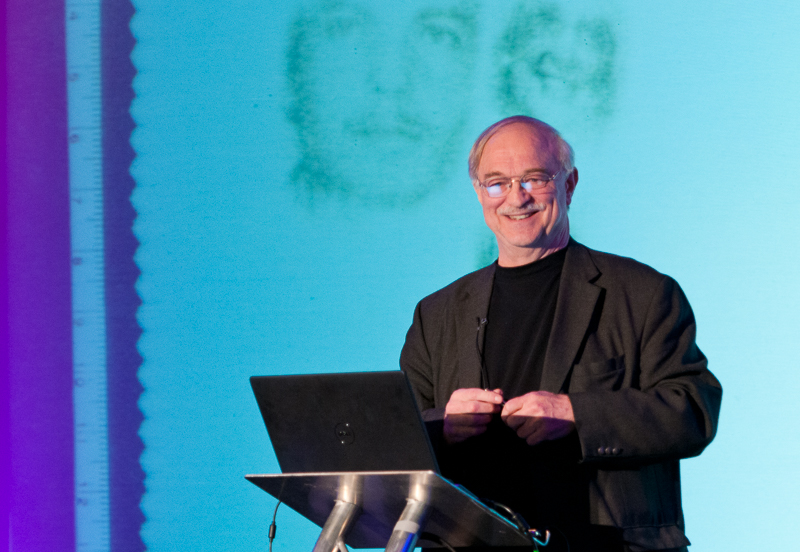
Joe Nickell at QED Con 2012 with spirit photos

Detecting Forgery: Forensic Investigation of Documents (1996) presents an overview of a document expert's work. He says that forged documents are often revealed by the forgers' ignorance of or inability to re-create historic typefaces, inks, papers, pens, watermarks, signatures, and historic styles. Nickell explains forgeries of Daniel Boone's musket, Mark Hofmann's Mormon papers, and the Vinland Map.

According to Publishers Weekly, Crime Science: Methods of Forensic Detection (1998) provided extensive basic information, with brief case studies.

In Real or Fake: Studies in Authentication (2009), Nickell drew on his early work related to technical aspects of paper, ink, typefaces, pens, and other keys to determining authenticity of paper documents. New material details the step-by-step investigations of specific cases: the purported diary of Jack the Ripper (fake), The Bondwoman's Narrative (date authenticated, author unknown), Lincoln's Lost Gettysburg Address (fake), and An Outlaw's Scribblings (fake).

=== Paranormal investigations ===
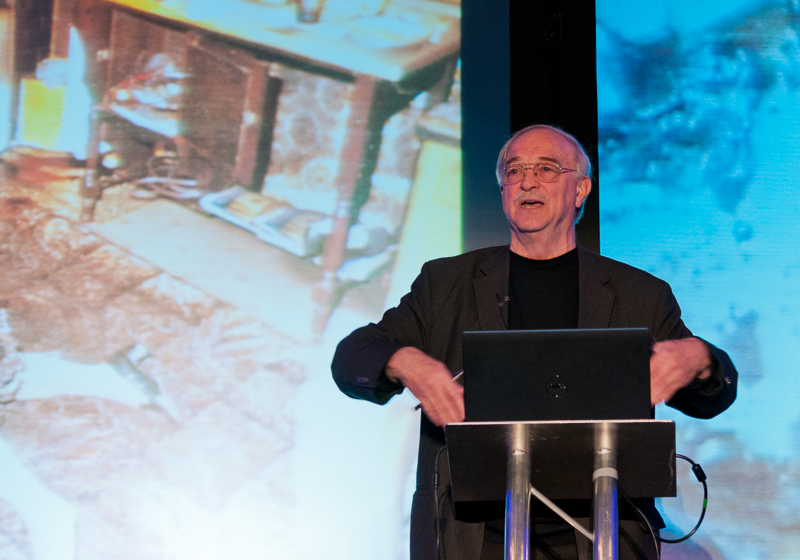
Joe Nickell at QED Con 2012 with photo of alleged Spontaneous Human Combustion

Secrets of the Supernatural: Investigating the World's Occult Mysteries was Nickell's first book of his paranormal investigation genre. He and his collaborator, John F. Fisher, looked for the answers to the Crystal Skulls, spontaneous human combustion, the Mackenzie House, and lesser known mysteries. On a Point of Inquiry podcast years later, Nickell explained that the same mysteries are reported over and over again because, "For each new generation, they have to re-learn that there is controversy ... Each new generation hears these for the first time ... It's an endless process in which you have to be willing to speak to the next crop of people."

Missing Pieces: How to Investigate Ghosts, UFOs, Psychics, and Other Mysteries, written by Nickell and Robert A. Baker, is a handbook that combines the practical techniques of investigating the paranormal with a description of the psychology of believers. Nickell often quoted Baker, "... there are no haunted places, only haunted people."

Mysterious Realms: Probing Paranormal, Historical, and Forensic Enigmas, written by Nickell and Fisher, analyzes 10 frequently reported mysteries, including the Kennedy assassination, Kentucky's Gray Lady ghost, and UFO cover-up conspiracy theories.

Nickell asked several researchers to investigate claims of psychic detectives. He collected their reports in Psychic Sleuths: ESP and Sensational Cases. None of the reports credits the psychics with factually supported insights. Nickell concludes that these individuals were either self-deluded or frauds. They used other psychological techniques to gain information, such as cold reading in discussions with police detectives, or retrofitting.

In Entities: Angels, Spirits, Demons, and Other Alien Beings, Nickell shows the development of ghost stories since the 17th century, and how they have been influenced by changing technology and communication methods. The faked Cottingley Fairies photographs, for example, became possible only when cameras became available to the general public.

The Outer Edge: Classic Investigations of the Paranormal is a collection of articles edited by Nickell, Barry Karr and Tom Genoni. It features Nickell and John F. Fischer's 1987 article, "Incredible Cremations: Investigating Spontaneous Combustion Deaths," along with essays by Martin Gardner, Ray Hyman, Susan Blackmore, and James Randi.

Adventures in Paranormal Investigation is a more detailed work than many of Nickell's. He ranges from dowsing to Frankenstein to healing spas. He includes an essay about learning that he had an adult daughter and accepting that she attributed her search for him to "intuition".

The first half of CSI Paranormal is a handbook on how to investigate paranormal claims. Nickell discusses his investigative strategy to:

1. Investigate on site
2. Check details of an account
3. Research precedents
4. Carefully examine physical evidence
5. Analyze development of a phenomenon
6. Assess a claim with a controlled test or experiment
7. Consider an innovative analysis
8. Attempt to recreate the "impossible"
9. Go undercover to investigate

In the second half of the book, Nickell shows how this strategy has been used to evaluate the claims of the Giant Ell, the Roswell UFO, the grilled cheese Madonna, and John Edward.

In The Science of Ghosts (2012), Nickell relates several archetype ghost stories—the girl in the snow, Elvis, phantom soldiers, and haunted lighthouses, castles, ships, and theaters. By tracking the development of these stories over the years, he demonstrates that the stories are not evidence of spirits, but evidence of the effects an appropriate setting can have on susceptible witnesses. He includes an analysis of 21st-century paranormal investigators, particularly Jason Hawes and Grant Wilson of the Syfy Channel's Ghost Hunters. He compares their investigations of the Myrtles Plantation, the Winchester Mystery House and the St. Augustine Lighthouse with his own.

=== Mysteries ===
Ambrose Bierce Is Missing And Other Historical Mysteries was Nickell's 1992 foray presenting historical investigations to the reading public. In the introduction, he uses the legal concepts of "a preponderance of the evidence" and "clear and compelling evidence" as standards by which hypotheses explaining mysteries should be objectively measured. Subjectively wishing an explanation is true can lead to imposing a hypothesis on the data instead of using data to test a hypothesis (the scientific method). Nickell's 2005 update of Ambrose Bierce, Unsolved History: Investigating Mysteries of the Past, is the same text with the addition of two books to its "Recommended Works".

Real-Life X-Files and its sequel, The Mystery Chronicle are a series of short essays on the histories, expanding mythologies, and likely causes of several dozen mysteries. In some cases, Nickell re-creates the legends, demonstrating that no special powers are needed to duplicate the effects. In others, he answers common lore with facts uncovered in his research. In 1982, Nickell and five of his relatives created a 440 foot long condor in a field in Kentucky by plotting coordinates of points on a drawing, a technique Nickell believes could have been used to create the Nazca Lines in Peru. "That is, on the small drawing we would measure along the center line from one end (the bird's beak) to a point on the line directly opposite the point to be plotted (say a wing tip). Then we would measure the distance from the center line to the desired point. A given number of units on the small drawing would require the same number of units—larger units—on the large drawing." In the case of West Virginia's Mothman, Nickell interviewed witnesses and conducted on-site experiments to find the most likely explanation for the original sightings. This investigation found that the mis-identification of an owl—most likely a Barred owl—was the most likely explanation.

Harry Eager of the Maui News calls Secrets of Sideshows "... virtually an encyclopedia of that nearly extinct form of entertainment." He faults Nickell for downplaying the brutality and grim fakery of the shows, especially what he calls "prettying" the geeks.

Lake Monster Mysteries: Investigating the World's Most Elusive Creatures is a collaboration of Nickell and Ben Radford. Author Ed Grabianowski summarizes one of the many possible explanations for lake monster sightings,

... a convincing argument based, again, on data mapping. He plotted the distribution of North American lake monster sightings. Then he overlaid the distribution of the common otter and found a near perfect match. It turns out that three or four otters swimming in a line look remarkably like a serpentine, humped creature undulating through the water. It is very easy to mistake for a single creature if you see them from a distance. "This isn't speculation. I'm not making this up," Nickell said. "I've spoken to people who saw what they thought was a lake monster, got closer and discovered it was actually a line of otters. That really happens." Clearly, not every lake monster sighting can be accounted for with otters, but it's an excellent example of how our perceptions can be fooled.

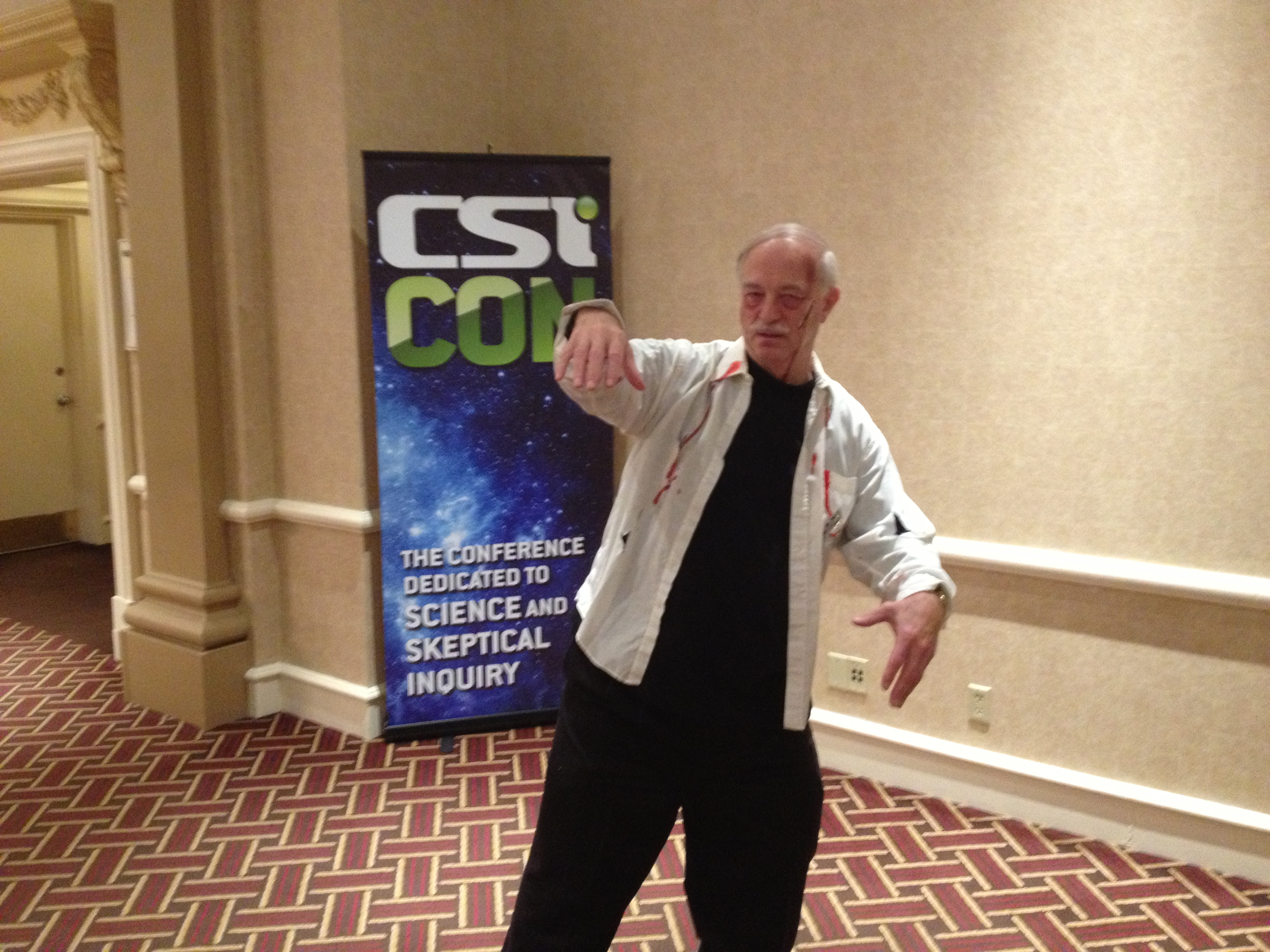
Joe Nickell as a zombie CSICon in Nashville 2012

The research for Tracking the Man-Beasts: Sasquatch, Vampires, Zombies, and More took Nickell to many locations of reported monster sightings—the Pacific Northwest for Bigfoot, Australia for the Yowie, Austria for werewolves, New England for vampires, Argentina for the Chupacabra, West Virginia for aliens, and Louisiana for the swamp creatures. Nickell traces the monsters' iconography from first reports to latest sightings, concluding that the tales reflect the evolution of their cultural environment, not any basis in fact. A quote from his guide in the Louisiana swamps provides insight into the genesis of the tales, "... frightening tales could sometimes have been concocted to keep outsiders away—to safeguard prime hunting territory or even possibly to help protect moonshine stills. Charbonnet also suggested that such stories served in a bogyman fashion, frightening children so they would keep away from dangerous areas."

=== Young readers ===
In 1989, Nickell wrote his first book for young readers, The Magic Detectives: Join Them in Solving Strange Mysteries, engaging children by presenting paranormal stories in the form of mysteries with clues embedded in the narrative. The solutions, printed upside down, follow each story. The book also contains teachers' guides for additional assignments and recommended readings.

The 1991 Wonder Workers! How They Perform the Impossible was summarized by P.J. Rooks as:

"... a 200-year, biographical tour of some of the more famous shenanigans and side show splendors of both sincere and charlatan magicians ... {that} guides readers on a fascinating exposé of magical history that leaves us, at the end of every page, thinking, "A-ha! I was wondering how they did that!'"

=== UFOs ===
In 1997, Nickell, with Kendrick Frazier and Barry Karr, published The UFO Invasion, an anthology of UFO articles written for the Skeptical Inquirer covering the topic from history and abductions to Roswell and crop circles. The editors included six of Nickell's articles in the book. Nickell explained the physiology of alien abduction stories, "People claiming to be abducted by aliens is such an astonishing thing that you think they have either be crazy or lying, and in fact they may be perfectly sane and normal. ... They probably were having these powerful waking dreams. ... In this state, they tend to see bizarre imagery. ... The other kind of experience is hypnosis. ... Hypnosis is the yellow brick road to fantasy land."

== Other investigations ==
=== The Shroud of Turin ===
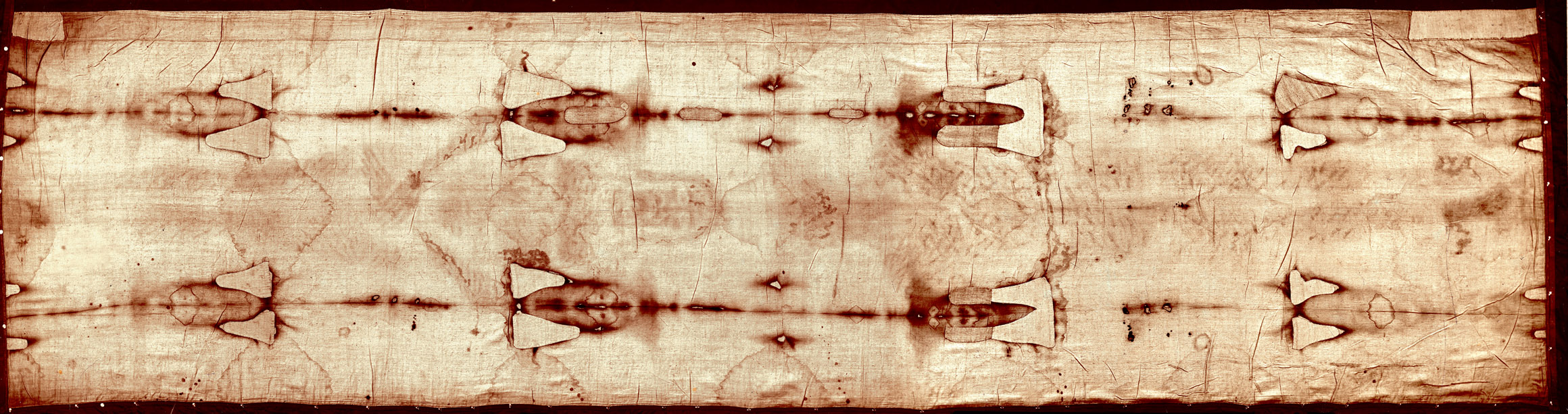
Shroud of Turin

The Shroud of Turin, claimed to be the burial cloth of Jesus miraculously imprinted with the image of his crucified body, is one of Christianity's most famous icons. The Roman Catholic Church, in possession of the Shroud since 1983, has allowed several public viewings and encourages devotions to the image, but takes no official position on the icon's authenticity. Nickell and others contend the Shroud is a 14th-century painting on linen, suggested through the 1988 radiocarbon dating. One of Nickell's many objections to the Shroud's authenticity is the proportions of the figure's face and body. Both are consistent with the proportions used by Gothic artists of the period and are not those of an actual person. Experts on both sides of the controversy have tried to duplicate the Shroud using medieval and modern methods. Claimants to the Shroud's authenticity believe the image could have been produced at the moment of resurrection by radiation, electrical discharge, or ultraviolet radiation; Nickell created a credible shroud using the bas relief method and contends that forgers had equivalent materials available during the 14th century.

People assume it was about religion. ... I put together a team that had Catholics, Protestants, Jews, and agnostics. ... For us it was not a religious issue, it was a matter of evidence. ... You want people to be precisely correct about evidence. Details matter.

=== The Warrens ===
Although Nickell rejected the term "debunker" to describe his work, his evidenced-based investigations of paranormal events did not uncover any miracles, ghosts or monsters. His insistence on documented facts led to a heated exchange with Ed and Lorraine Warren on the Sally show in 1992. Nickell and the Warrens appeared on Sally Jessy Raphael's talk show with the Snedeker family, whose reports of ghosts and demons led to the 1992 book, In A Dark Place, The Story of a True Haunting by novelist Ray Garton and the 2009 movie, The Haunting in Connecticut. After an on-air threat of violence from Ed Warren, Nickell stated:

I've investigated haunted houses for some twenty years. I've not met a house that I thought was haunted; I think the Warrens have not met a house they didn't think was haunted. ... The houses that sincere people report they think are haunted usually follow a certain pattern. This is a hodgepodge of the sort of ghost tale, poltergeist, part demon, part this, part that. We saw a similar pattern with the Amityville Horror, a case that the Warrens thought was genuine. It turned out to be a blatant hoax, concocted over several bottles of wine.

Nickell continued to cite the Warrens as an example of exploitative and harmful charlatans. He told Blake Smith, host of the MonsterTalk podcast,

The next thing you know, the Warrens have convinced everybody that there were demons involved. Lorraine would go into one of her light trances, which would mean she would just close her eyes and haul off and say something. She would sense some demonic presence. The two of them would talk a good talk about this. You see these poor unsuspecting people who first of all don't know anything about the paranormal and not aware that there are no haunted places, only haunted people, as Robert Baker used to say. When you have someone who's an expert explaining to them that there are these different kinds of spirits and this and that and the other, they don't know any better. They think maybe these people know what they're talking about. It's interesting that in every case of this, these were Catholic families. Ed and Lorraine would show up and convince them that it was really demonic and that they really needed to use their Catholic powers of exorcism and holy water and so forth. They were converted into a demonic book and then they would get a ghost writer. All of the shenanigans would be restyled and exaggerated and spooky elements thrown in.

=== Aliens ===
Nickell proposed that alien encounters are the result of misinterpreted natural phenomena, hoaxes, or a fantasy prone personality. To explain the evolving nature of alien sightings, Nickell told the Skeptics' Guide to the Universe podcast team,

I did an alien timeline, and did sort of Walt Disney-esque cartoon drawings of the different types of aliens, starting in 1947 with some little green men, and showing the sort of imaginative variety of alien types over the years, of hairy dwarves, and cyclopean figures, and robotic forms and blobs and just all manner. Just as people would imagine; if I asked someone to imagine an alien creature, it would be all over the place. But then, with the Betty and Barney Hill case, you began to get the little big-eyed, big-headed humanoid, and that type came back and back until now, if you go into a toy store and you look at aliens, you see pretty much that's the standard model. Very unlikely that if life developed on some distant planet, that it would look so much like us. We tend to make the various entities that we're interested in in our own image. And so Bigfoot is our big, stupid cousin from the past, and ET is our futuristic relative coming from the future back to save us. These are forms of us. Of course, ghosts are transparent forms of us; angels are us with wings, and of course, vampires are us with an attitude.

== Magazine articles and website blogs ==
Nickell wrote the "Investigative Files" column for the Skeptical Inquirer (SI) magazine from 1995 until his death and contributed frequently to the Center for Inquiry website. The articles reflect the range of Nickell's interests and investigative skills, including spontaneous human combustion, ghost photographs, reincarnation, voodoo, Bigfoot, quack medicine, Elvis, psychic frauds, and phrenology. In his SI article about the Bell Witch Poltergeist, Nickell analyzed the content of the alleged Bell Manuscript for anachronistic references and word use, comparing the writing styles of Richard Williams Bell, the reported original author, and M.V. Ingram, the reporter who expanded on the story 50 years later. Nickell concludes, "Given all of these similarities between the texts, in addition to the other evidence, I have little hesitation in concluding that Ingram was the author of 'Bell'".

Nickell's writing for the Center for Inquiry (CfI) included "Nickell-odeon Reviews", written with an emphasis on the facts behind the scripts. Nickell added credibility to the plot of the Charles Dickens movie, The Invisible Woman. "Although not mentioned in the movie, posthumous confirmation of the affair came from Dickens' letters. Although many had been destroyed by his family, some merely had offending passages inked out. But that cloak of invisibility was ineffective: Dickens scholars turned to forensics, using infrared photography to read the obscured portions. These contained references to "Nelly" and confirmed the persistent rumors."

== Awards ==
Nickell received the 2004 Isaac Asimov Award from the American Humanist Association and was a co-recipient of the 2005 and the 2012 Robert P. Balles Prize in Critical thinking, awarded by CSICOP, now called CSI. In 2000 he was presented with the Distinguished Skeptic award from CSI.

He was also presented an award for promotion of science in popular media at the 3rd Annual Independent Investigative Group IIG Awards, held on May 18, 2009.

In October 2011 asteroid 31451 (1999 CE10) was named JoeNickell in his honor by its discoverer James E. McGaha.

== Personal life ==
In late 2003, Nickell reconnected with his college girlfriend Diana Harris after Harris searched for him because her daughter Cherette questioned her lack of resemblance to the man who raised her. Harris had briefly dated Nickell in college. After a DNA test proved he was the biological father to Cherette he wrote an article for Skeptical Inquirer about his daughter’s intuition. In it he concluded: "Cautions notwithstanding, I must admit to a new appreciation of intuition, without which I would not have known of my wonderful daughter – and two grandsons! It's enough to warm an old skeptic's heart." Harris and Nickell married April 1, 2006. Harris had since assisted Nickell in his investigative work.

Nickell died in Buffalo, New York, on March 4, 2025, at the age of 80.

== Major works ==
- Inquest on the Shroud of Turin: Latest Scientific Findings (Prometheus Books: Amherst, NY; 1983). Revised edition, 1998.
- Secrets of the Supernatural: Investigating the World's Occult Mysteries (Prometheus Books: Amherst, NY; 1988, 1991; with John F. Fischer).
- The Magic Detectives: Join Them in Solving Strange Mysteries (Prometheus Books: Amherst, NY; 1989).
- Pen, Ink, and Evidence: A Study of Writing and Writing Materials for the Penman, Collector, and Document Detective (Oak Knoll Books: New Castle, DE; 1990, 2000, 2003).
- Wonder-Workers! How They Perform the Impossible (Prometheus Books: Amherst, NY; 1991).
- Unsolved History: Investigating Mysteries of the Past originally published as Ambrose Bierce is Missing and Other Historical Mysteries (University Press of Kentucky: Lexington; 1992, 2005).
- Missing Pieces: How to Investigate Ghosts, UFOs, Psychics, and Other Mysteries (Prometheus Books: Amherst, NY; 1992; with Robert A. Baker).
- Mysterious Realms: Probing Paranormal, Historical, and Forensic Enigmas (Prometheus Books: Amherst, NY; 1992; with John F. Fischer).
- Looking for a Miracle: Weeping Icons, Relics, Stigmata, Visions and Healing Cures (Prometheus Books: Amherst, NY; 1993, 1998).
- Psychic Sleuths: ESP and Sensational Cases (Prometheus Books: Amherst, NY; 1994).
- Camera Clues: A Handbook for Photographic Investigation (University Press of Kentucky: Lexington; 1994, 2005).
- Entities: Angels, Spirits, Demons, and Other Alien Beings (Prometheus Books: Amherst, NY; 1995).
- Detecting Forgery: Forensic Investigation of Documents (University Press of Kentucky: Lexington; 1996, 2005).
- The Outer Edge: Classic Investigations of the Paranormal (CSICOP: Amherst, NY; 1996, co-edited with Barry Karr and Tom Genoni).
- The UFO Invasion: The Roswell Incident, Alien Abductions, and Government Coverups (Prometheus Books: Amherst, NY; 1997; co-edited with Kendrick Frazier and Barry Karr).
- Crime Science: Methods of Forensic Detection (University Press of Kentucky: Lexington; 1999; with co-author John F. Fischer).
- Real-Life X-Files: Investigating the Paranormal (University Press of Kentucky: Lexington; 2001).
- The Kentucky Mint Julep (University Press of Kentucky: Lexington; 2003).
- Investigating the Paranormal (Barnes & Noble Books: New York; 2004).
- The Mystery Chronicles: More Real-Life X-Files (University Press of Kentucky: Lexington; 2004).
- Secrets of the Sideshows (University Press of Kentucky: Lexington; 2005).
- Cronache del Misterio (Newton Compton editori: Rome; 2006).
- Lake Monster Mysteries: Investigating the World's Most Elusive Creatures, (University Press of Kentucky: Lexington; 2006; with co-author Benjamin Radford).
- Relics of the Christ (University Press of Kentucky: Lexington; 2007).
- Adventures in Paranormal Investigation (University Press of Kentucky: Lexington; 2007).
- Tracking The Man-Beasts: Sasquatch, Vampires, Zombies, and More (Prometheus Books: Amhurst, NY; 2011).
- Real or Fake: Studies in Authentication (University Press of Kentucky: Lexington; 2009).
- CSI Paranormal, (Inquiry Press): Amherst, NY; 2012.
- The Science of Ghosts (Prometheus Books: Amherst, NY; 2012).
- The Science of Miracles: Investigating the Incredible (Prometheus Books: Amherst, NY; 2013).

== See also ==
- James Randi
- Óscar González-Quevedo
