= Richard Macksey =

American humanities professor (1931–2019)

Richard Alan Macksey (July 25, 1931 – July 22, 2019) was Professor of Humanities and co-founder and longtime Director of the Humanities Center (now the Department of Comparative Thought and Literature) at The Johns Hopkins University, where he taught critical theory, comparative literature, and film studies. Macksey was educated at Princeton and Johns Hopkins, earning his B.A. at the latter in 1953 and his Ph.D. in 1957. He taught at Johns Hopkins (both the school of Arts & Sciences as well as the Medical School) beginning in the autumn of 1958 as an assistant professor in The Writing Seminars. He was the longtime Comparative Literature editor of MLN (Modern Language Notes), published by Johns Hopkins University Press. He was a recipient of the University's George E. Owen Teaching Award in 1992, honouring his teaching ability and dedication to undergraduates and the Hopkins Distinguished Alumnus Award in 1999.

During this time, he also played a significant role in the creation of the Humanities Center, aiding in the sponsorship of courses in literature, art, philosophy, and history. Macksey also presided over one of the largest private libraries in Maryland, with over 70,000 books and manuscripts. An image of the room overspilling with books has been a popular internet meme in the 2010s and 2020s.

As Director for the Humanities Center, Macksey, with funding from the Ford Foundation, organized the influential international literary theory symposium, "The Languages of Criticism and the Sciences of Man," which featured prominent academics such as Paul de Man, Jacques Derrida, Roland Barthes, and Jacques Lacan, and where Derrida presented his lecture "Structure, Sign, and Play in the Discourse of the Human Sciences", credited with "tear[ing] down the temple of structuralism." These lectures were collected as The Structuralist Controversy, the most recent version of which was published in 2005.

In May 1999, the Richard A. Macksey Professorship for Distinguished Teaching in the Humanities was established by a former student Edward T. Dangel III and his wife, Bonni Widdoes. The professorship is currently held by Alice McDermott.

Notable students of Richard Macksey include Susan Stewart, Caleb Deschanel, Peter Koper, Walter Murch, Matthew Robbins, and Hollis Robbins.

== Personal life and attributes ==
Not much is known about Macksey's personal life. In an article written by Greg Rienzi, Macksey describes his own " lack of focus" as his most defining characteristic. Described as "known to wander sometimes during a conversation", however, despite this, as well as a tendency to be difficult to get a straight answer out of, successfully became a respected and popular member of faculty.

Macksey had a range of interests. Despite describing himself as lacking in focus, he appeared to be capable of dedicating immense time and effort to various fields of knowledge. Macksey was able to read and write in six languages. This may have also been possible due to his, as described by colleague Neil Hertz, professor of English and director of the Humanities Center, "astonishing memory".

Students, such as the aforementioned Terry Dangel recall being "overwhelmed by the level of knowledge the young Professor Macksey had".

== Publications ==
- The Structuralist Controversy: The Languages of Criticism and the Sciences of Man. JHU Press 1970.
- Velocities of Change: Critical Essays from MLN (Modern Language Notes) JHU Press 1974.
- The Johns Hopkins Guide to Literary Theory & Criticism. (Foreword) 2nd Edition. Baltimore: The Johns Hopkins University Press, 2005.
