= The Bondwoman's Narrative =

19th-century slave narrative by Hannah Crafts

- First edition
- Editor: Henry Louis Gates Jr.
- Author: Hannah Crafts
- Cover artist: Giorgetta B. McRee
- Language: English language
- Publisher: Warner Books
- Publication date: 2002
- Publication place: United States
- Media type: Print (Paperback& Hardback)
- Pages: 365
- ISBN: 0-446-69029-5 (Paperback), ISBN 0-446-53008-5 (Hardback)
- OCLC: 52082864

The Bondwoman's Narrative is a novel by Hannah Crafts whose plot revolves around an escape from slavery in North Carolina. The manuscript was not authenticated and properly published until 2002. Scholars believe that the novel was written between 1853 and 1861. It is one of the first novels by an African-American woman; another is the novel Our Nig by Harriet Wilson, published in 1859, while an autobiography from the same time period is Incidents in the Life of a Slave Girl by Harriet Jacobs, published in 1861.

The 2002 publication includes a preface by Henry Louis Gates Jr., professor of African-American literature and history at Harvard University, describing his buying the manuscript, verifying it, and research to identify the author. Crafts was believed to be a pseudonym of an enslaved woman who had escaped from the plantation of John Hill Wheeler.

In September 2013, Gregg Hecimovich, a professor of English at Winthrop University, documented the novelist as Hannah Bond, who later adopted her pen name, Crafts, an African-American slave who escaped about 1857 from the plantation of Wheeler in Murfreesboro, North Carolina. She reached the North and settled in New Jersey.

== Plot summary ==
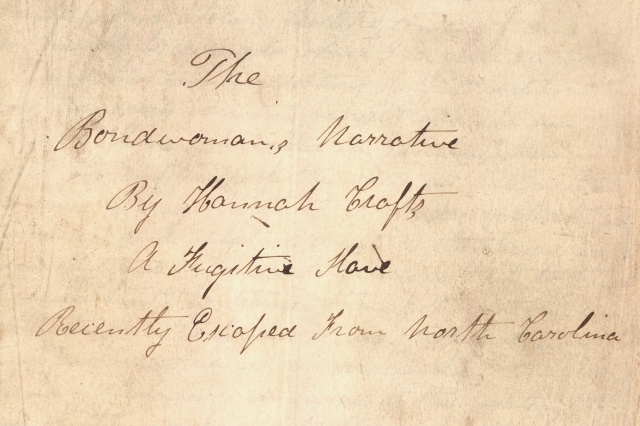
Title page of manuscript of The Bondwoman's Narrative. Beinecke Rare Book and Manuscript Library, gift of Henry Louis Gates Jr.

Crafts explores the experiences of Hannah, a house slave in North Carolina. In the preface, Crafts writes that she hopes "to show how slavery blights the lives of whites as well as the black race."

The novel opens by narrating how Hannah grew up on a plantation in Virginia, where she was taught as a child to read and write by Aunt Hetty, a kind old white woman, who was subsequently discovered and reprimanded, as the education of slaves was supposed to be limited. This establishes her literacy, which is important in grounding her right and ability to tell her story. She describes herself as of a "complexion almost white." After a carriage accident, she recovers with the Henrys, who then sell her to the Wheelers, ending up in North Carolina with the latter family.

As a young woman, Hannah serves as a lady's maid at Lindendale plantation. Her master and mistress host a large wedding. During the party, Hannah notices an unattractive old man following her new mistress. Hannah concludes that "each one was conscious of some great and important secret on the part of the other." In the coming weeks, after observing her new mistress lock herself away most of the day, Hannah comes to learn that the old man is Mr. Trappe, a crooked lawyer who has discovered that the mistress is a fair-skinned mulatto who is passing for white.

Hannah and the mistress flee the plantation in the middle of the night, become lost, and stay the night in a gloomy shack in the forest. The shack was recently the scene of a murder, and is strewn with bloodstained weapons and clothes. Under these conditions, Hannah's mistress starts to go insane.

Months later, the women are found by a group of hunters who escort them to prison. One of them, Horace, informs Hannah that her master slit his throat after their escape. The women are taken to prison, where they meet Mrs. Wright, a senile woman imprisoned for trying to help an enslaved girl escape. The mistress' insanity worsens. After several months, the women are moved to a house, where conditions are much better, but they are unable to leave or know the identity of their captor. After a lengthy imprisonment, it is revealed that their captor is Mr. Trappe. The mistress, upon learning this, suffers a brain aneurysm and dies.

Hannah is sold to a slave trader. As she is being transported, the cart horse bolts and runs the cart off a ledge. The slave trader is killed instantly. Hannah wakes up in the home of her new mistress, Mrs. Henry, a kindly woman who treats her well. As Hannah recuperates, Mrs. Henry is told that Hannah's previous owner wishes to claim her.

Despite Hannah's pleas, the young woman is returned to the status of house slave, but she is sold to the Wheelers. She describes Mrs. Wheeler as a vain, self-centered woman. At one time, her husband serves as the United States Minister to Nicaragua. (This was one of the details that led to tracing Crafts as a slave held by John Hill Wheeler.)

One day, when sent to town for facial powder, Hannah hears news of Mr. Trappe's death. After Mrs. Wheeler uses the new facial powder, she discovers that it reacts with her perfume or smelling salts, causing a blackening effect on her skin. Mrs. Wheeler realizes she had blackface in an encounter with a prominent woman, causing her much emotional discomfort. After the family moves to North Carolina and she replaces Hannah as her maid with another house slave, Mrs. Wheeler suspects Hannah of telling others about the blackface incident. As punishment, she orders Hannah to the fields for labor, and plans for her to be raped. Hannah escapes and flees to the North.

Along the way, Hannah comes under the care again of Mrs. Hetty, the kind white woman who originally taught her to read and write. Mrs. Hetty facilitates Hannah's escape to the North, where the young woman rejoins her mother. There she marries a Methodist minister and lives in New Jersey.

== Characters ==
- Hannah — The narrator of the story. She is a young slave woman of mixed race who twice runs away. The character is believed to be analogous to Hannah Crafts, the author of the book, although the name was most likely a pseudonym.
- The Mistress — The Mistress at Lindendale (who remains unnamed throughout the novel) is a fair-skinned mulatto who was switched with another baby at birth and raised as a wealthy aristocrat. After her secret is discovered by Mr. Trappe, she is manipulated until she succumbs to the pressure and dies.
- Aunt Hetty — The kindly white woman who originally teaches Hannah to read and write. After running away a second time, Hannah is aided by Aunt Hetty in her escape to the North. It is not known if this character is based on someone in the author's life.
- Mr. Trappe — The main antagonist of the story. A crooked lawyer, Mr. Trappe discovers and exploits the secrets of rich families. The character may be modeled after Mr. Tulkinghorn from Charles Dickens' novel Bleak House.
- Mrs. Wheeler — A woman who buys Hannah after her accident. She has little respect for Hannah. After being humiliated in a blackface incident, she orders Hannah to be given to a slave overseer to use as his wife. Hannah flees before this can occur.

== Major influences ==
The novel shows that Hannah Crafts was aware of and influenced by the popular literary trends of the day and major works by British novelists. Henry Louis Gates Jr. found that her master John Hill Wheeler's library was filled with works of contemporary fiction. Compared to the 100 autobiographical works by Blacks published before 1865, Crafts exceeded them in the number of quotes from other texts, demonstrating her wide reading. Literacy for slaves was an act of resistance, and scholars are interested in evidence of what they were reading.

Literary scholar Hollis Robbins first observed that Crafts must have read Charles Dickens' Bleak House (although this was not included on Wheeler's library list), Walter Scott's Rob Roy, and Scientific American. Robbins has written that Crafts may have read a serialized version of Dickens' novel in Frederick Douglass's Paper, which had a high circulation among fugitive slaves. Scholar Catherine Keyser has noted influences from Charlotte Brontë's Jane Eyre in Crafts' writing.

In total, Gates and Robbins document that Crafts

echoes or lifts passages from a remarkably impressive range of English and American literature, including Horace Walpole's Castle of Otranto, Charlotte Brontë's Jane Eyre, Walter Scott's Rob Roy and Redgauntlet, Thomas Campbell's Life and Letters, Dickens's Old Curiosity Shop and Bleak House, Felicia Heman's poetry, John Gauden's Discourse on Artificial Beauty, William Wirt's Life of Patrick Henry, Shakespeare's Macbeth and Antony and Cleopatra, Michel Chevalier's Society, Manners and Politics in the United States and Phillis Wheatley's To a Lady on the Death of Her Husband, as well as Douglass's Narrative and Harriet Beecher Stowe's Uncle Tom's Cabin. Each of these -- except for Bleak House -- appears in the 1882 catalog listing the books that her master owned (and Wheeler owned four other works by Dickens).

Gregg Hecimovich of Winthrop University, who in 2013 documented the author as Hannah Bond, learned that girls from a nearby school often boarded at the Murfreesboro plantation where she worked as a lady's maid for Ellen Wheeler. Part of the girls' curriculum required them to read and memorize Dickens' Bleak House. Bond borrowed some of its elements for her novel, and may have heard the girls reading aloud or read from one of their copies of the book.

== Scholarly response ==
The initial scholarly response to the book appeared in a collection of essays entitled In Search of Hannah Crafts, featuring literary scholars Nina Baym, Lawrence Buell, William Andrews, John Stauffer, William Gleason, and many others. Scholar Anne Fabian, for example, argued that Crafts is a literary iconoclast and rule breaker, breaking the rules that governed texts previously written and published by slaves. Jean Fagan Yellin examined the influence of Harriet Beecher Stowe's Uncle Tom's Cabin on Crafts and Shelley Fisher Fishkin examined the influence of William Wells Brown's well-known play The Escape, or, A Leap for Freedom, casting light on Crafts's class and race consciousness. William Gleason argued that The Bondwoman's Narrative is deeply invested in the politics of architectural form and reveals a sophisticated sense of the relationship between race and architecture. In addition to Hollis Robbins's work on the borrowings from Charles Dickens and Walter Scott, Catherine Keyser focuses on Crafts's borrowings from Charlotte Brontë's Jane Eyre, making a thorough textual-critical case for her literary transformations.

Important scholarly work published after In Search of Hannah Crafts includes:

- Gill Ballinger, Tim Lustig and Dale Townshend (2005), "Missing Intertexts: Hannah Crafts's The Bondwoman's Narrative and African American Literary History."
- R. J. Ellis (2007), "'Whatever the law permits': Hannah Crafts's The Bondwoman's Narrative."
- Daniel Hack (2008), "Close Reading at a Distance: The African Americanization of Bleak House."
- R. J. Ellis (2009), "'So amiable and good': Hannah Crafts's The Bondwoman's Narrative and its Lineages."
- Rachel Teukolsky (2009), "Pictures in Bleak Houses: Slavery and the Aesthetics of Transatlantic Reform."
- Rebecca Soares (2011), "2010 VanArsdel Prize Essay: Literary Graftings: Hannah Crafts's The Bondwoman's Narrative and the Nineteenth-Century Transatlantic Reader."
- Vicent Cucharilla-Ramon (2015), "The black female slave takes literary revenge: Female gothic motifs against slavery in Hannah Crafts’s 'The Bondwoman’s Narrative.'"

Other recent scholarship builds upon existing findings. Richard J. Gray, for example, re-emphasizes that Crafts creates a heroine who is a young orphan woman, and who is literate and refined, as found in novels by Jane Austen and Charlotte Brontë.

== Background of manuscript ==
Henry Louis Gates Jr. acquired the manuscript in 2001 in an annual auction by Swann Galleries. The catalogue described the novel as an "Unpublished Original Manuscript; a fictionalized biography, written in an effusive style, purporting to be the story, of the early life and escape of one Hannah Crafts." Its history could be traced to the 1940s, when it was owned by African-American scholar Dorothy Porter.

Gates bought the historic manuscript at a relatively low price of $8,500. He proceeded to verify the text as an historical artifact, and drew on expertise by a variety of scholars. Wyatt Houston Day, a bookseller and authenticator, wrote: "I can say unequivocally that the manuscript was written before 1861, because had it been written afterward, it would have most certainly contained some mention of the war or at least secession." Kenneth W. Rendell identified the original ink as iron gall ink, most widely used up until 1860. Joe Nickell, the author of numerous books on literary assessment, used a variety of techniques to evaluate the manuscript, studying the paper, ink, provenance, writing style, etc. As a result of his review, Gates agreed with others who concluded that Crafts was most likely black because she portrays her black characters first as people, and demonstrates knowledge of the slave caste system. In addition, she demonstrates insider knowledge of specifics regarding slave escape routes; and makes numerous conventional mistakes in language.

Henry Louis Gates Jr. noted that Crafts referred to historical figures and actual places in her novel; among those were the Cosgroves, found in the Virginia census; Mr. Henry, a Presbyterian minister in Stafford County, Virginia; and Jane Johnson, a slave from John H. Wheeler's Washington, DC household, who gained freedom in 1855 in Philadelphia, Pennsylvania (a free state). Wheeler was taking her and her two young sons along with his family en route to his posting as US Minister in Nicaragua. The case received national coverage because abolitionist Passmore Williamson was jailed for contempt of court by a federal district judge, and because of conflicts between state and federal laws related to slavery.

After verification and editing, Gates arranged for publication of the novel by Time-Warner in 2002, as The Bondwoman's Narrative by Hannah Crafts (Author), Henry Louis Gates Jr. (Editor) (it includes material about his authentication and attempts to identify the author.) Due to the intense interest in such an early work, the only known novel by a fugitive slave and likely the first by an African-American woman, its publication was followed closely. The book quickly became a bestseller.

== Identifying Hannah Crafts ==
Efforts continued to identify the author, and the book attracted widespread attention. Learning that Jane Johnson lived in Boston, Katherine E. Flynn, a scientist and skilled genealogist, began to research her life. In addition to being able to document major life events for Johnson after she reached Boston, Flynn concluded that she might have been Hannah Crafts, as her novel appeared to have been written by someone close to the John Hill Wheeler household. Flynn published an article on this in 2002 in the National Genealogical Society Quarterly.

In 2003, Gates and Hollis Robbins published In Search of Hannah Crafts, about their research on this topic, as well as more on the literary influences found in the novel. No conclusions were reached as to Crafts' identity, though Gates and Robbins note the promise of Gregg Hecimovich's research.

In 2013, Gregg Hecimovich of Winthrop University in South Carolina announced having documented Crafts' identity as Hannah Bond, an enslaved African-American woman on the plantation of John H. Wheeler and his wife Ellen in Murfreesboro, North Carolina. Bond served there as a lady's maid to Ellen Wheeler, and escaped about 1857, settling finally in New Jersey. In his documentation of Hannah Bond's life, Hecimovich found that the paper in her manuscript was a distinctive one used by the Wheeler family and kept in their library. It had already been established that Crafts/Bond had read widely among the books of the library, as she quoted these in her work.

== See also ==
- Our Nig (1859) by Harriet Wilson (found, edited and republished by Gates Jr.)
- Slave narratives
- African-American literature
