= The Parent's Assistant =

1796 collection of children's stories by Maria Edgeworth

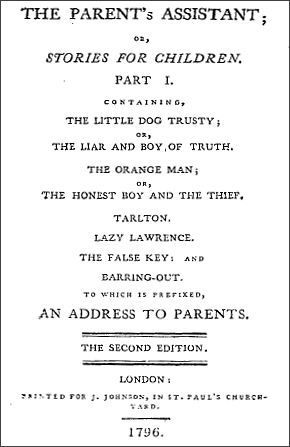
- Title page from the second edition
- Author: Maria Edgeworth
- Language: English
- Genre: children's literature
- Publisher: Joseph Johnson
- Publication date: 1796
- Publication place: United Kingdom
- Media type: Print

The Parent's Assistant is the first collection of children's stories by Maria Edgeworth, published by Joseph Johnson in 1796.

== Contents ==
Illustration for the story Lazy Lawrence.

The first edition (Part I) had five stories: Lazy Lawrence, Tarlton, The Little Dog Trusty, The Orange Man and The False Key. Barring Out was included in the second edition of Part I published the same year. In later editions more material was added, most notably, "The Purple Jar", and a play for children, Old Poz. The 1865 American edition contained the following stories: "Lazy Lawrence", "Tarlton", "The False Key", "The Birthday Present", "Simple Susan", "The Bracelets", "The Little Merchants", "Old Poz", "The Mimic", "Mademoiselle Panache", "The Basket Woman", "The White Pigeon", "The Orphans", "Waste Not, Want Not", "Forgive and Forget", "The Barring Out, or Party Spirit", and "Eton Montem".

== Influence ==
Queen Victoria was reading The Parent's Assistant in 1837, just three months before her coronation. She recalls reading "The Birthday Present" in "Miss Edgeworth's inimitable and delightful Parent's Assistant" while doing her hair. The collection is also mentioned in William Thackeray's novel Vanity Fair and is mentioned in Eight Cousins also.
