= A. S. "Doc" Young =

American journalist

- Born: October 29, 1919; Dunbrooke, Virginia
- Died: September 6, 1996 (aged 76); Los Angeles, California
- Education: Hampton Institute
- Occupations: Journalist, writer
- Notable credit(s): Chicago Defender; Ebony Magazine; Los Angeles Sentinel; Sepia
- Spouse: Hazel M. Young
- Children: Norman Gregory Young, PhD; Brenda L. Young, Esq.
- Relatives: Ruth Y. Wilson, sister

Andrew Spurgeon "Doc" Young (October 29, 1919 – September 6, 1996) was an American sports journalist and author. He was also one of the first African American publicists working in Hollywood. Throughout his career he received numerous honors from the National Newspaper Publishers Association.

== Background ==
Andrew Spurgeon Young was born in Dunbrooke, Virginia, the eldest child of Andrew P. Young and Gertrude Norman. In 1941, he graduated from Hampton Institute (now Hampton University) with a bachelor's degree in business administration. While a student at Hampton, he served as editor of the school newspaper.

== Career ==
As a young man, he was influenced by the work of Frank A. (Fay) Young (no relation), the first African American to have a weekly sports column.

In the 1950s, he served in several top editorial positions at Jet Magazine and Ebony Magazine. He also worked in editorial positions at the Los Angeles Sentinel, Sepia and the Chicago Defender.

Young also has the distinction of being the first black publicist in Hollywood. He worked as a unit publicist on the films The Defiant Ones and Kings Go Forth.

Additionally, Young is the author of several books, including Negro Firsts in Sports (Johnson Publishing Company, 1963).

=== Death ===
Young died in 1996 from pneumonia in Los Angeles.
