= Robert A. Baker =

American psychologist and scientific skeptic (1921–2005)

- Born: June 27, 1921; Blackford, Kentucky, U.S.
- Died: August 8, 2005 (aged 84); Lexington, Kentucky, U.S.
- Education: University of Kentucky; Stanford University
- Known for: Ghost and UFO investigations. Critic of psychiatric pseudoscience and coercion.
- Scientific career
- Fields: Psychology
- Workplaces: Massachusetts Institute of Technology Lincoln Laboratory; Human Resources Research Office at Fort Knox; University of Kentucky

Robert Allen Baker Jr. (June 27, 1921 – August 8, 2005) was an American psychologist, professor of psychology emeritus of the University of Kentucky, skeptic, author, and investigator of ghosts, UFO abductions, lake monsters and other paranormal phenomena. He is the editor of Psychology in the Wry, a collection of satire, and was formerly the co-editor of Approaches, a quarterly journal of contemporary poetry. His satirical and humorous verses have appeared in Vogue, Saturday Review, The Journal of Irreproducible Results, Worm-Runners' Digest, and other journals. He wrote 15 books and is a past fellow of the Committee for Skeptical Inquiry.

== Personal life ==
Baker was born in 1921 in the little community of Blackford, in Webster County, Kentucky. His father did shoe repair and his mother was a drugstore clerk. Despite their own lack of education, his parents encouraged him to study from an early age. He attended primary school in Hopkinsville, Kentucky and graduated from Hopkinsville High School in 1939. He served in the Army Air Forces as a cryptographer during World War II, and began reading about human psychology at that time.

Baker died of congestive heart failure on the 52nd anniversary of his marriage to Rose Paalz "Dolly" Baker, with whom he fathered six children.

== Academic career ==
Baker graduated from the University of Kentucky in 1948 and later returned to receive a master's degree in psychology. He received a doctorate in psychology from Stanford University in 1951.

After completing his PhD, he became a staff scientist at MIT's Lincoln Laboratory, doing military research. In 1953 he joined the Human Resources Research Office at Fort Knox, where he did human factors research relating to the Army.

He served on the faculty of Chico State College and Indiana University Southeast and was a staff psychologist for the Kentucky Department of Corrections. In 1969 he joined the faculty of the University of Kentucky in the psychology department. He was chairman of the psychology department for four years. Baker spent the last 20 years of his career here, until his retirement.

He served as president of the Kentucky Psychological Association and was a fellow of the American Psychological Association.

Baker was a critic of pseudoscience in the practice of psychiatry and psychotherapy, and of the coercive nature of psychiatry. He wrote on this topic and allied himself with Thomas Szasz in his criticism. In a 2002 letter to Szasz, Baker metaphorically referred to psychiatrists as "rapists wearing the mantle of science."

== Career as a skeptic ==
His parents instilled skepticism in him from an early age. He was interested in ghosts as a child, but was disappointed to discover upon investigation that the noises emanating from a nearby "haunted cave" were actually natural in origin.

As a university psychologist, he sometimes encountered cases with a paranormal element. He would do his best to find a non-paranormal explanation or resolution for these cases, and eventually gained a reputation as a "ghost buster".

When Joe Nickell was seeking an advanced degree at the University of Kentucky, the two met. They later worked together on several paranormal investigations and co-wrote a book on the topic. Nickell once said, "No one knew more about alien abductions than Robert Baker."

After retiring from the university in 1989, he devoted much of his time to anomalistic psychology and scientific skepticism, writing several books on related topics including hypnosis, ghosts, alien abductions and false memory syndrome. Baker wrote that many paranormal phenomena can be explained via psychological effects such as hallucinations, sleep paralysis and hidden memories, a phenomenon in which experiences that originally make little conscious impression are filed away in the brain to be suddenly remembered later in an altered form.

He was an organizer with and served as president of the Kentucky Association of Science Educators and Skeptics. He wrote numerous articles and book reviews for Skeptical Inquirer magazine and CSI's Skeptical Briefs newsletter.

In 2000, he was acknowledged when a panel of experts chose the outstanding skeptics of the 20th Century.

At a meeting of the executive council of the Committee for Skeptical Inquiry (CSI) in Denver, Colorado in April 2011, Baker was selected for inclusion in CSI's Pantheon of Skeptics. The Pantheon of Skeptics was created by CSI to remember the legacy of deceased fellows of CSI and their contributions to the cause of scientific skepticism.

== Plagiarism allegations ==
Readers of Skeptical Inquirer, noticed in 1994 similarities between one of Baker's articles and William Grey's article Philosophy and the Paranormal, Part 2. After discovering this, Baker wrote to Grey apologizing for "forgetting both the direct quotation and the reference citation", he claims that it was an oversight. Grey publicly accepted Baker's apology in the Skeptical Inquirer. In the following year, author Terence Hines accused Baker of unattributed quotations from an article by Melvin Harris and from his own book Pseudoscience and the Paranormal. Baker responded in Skeptical Inquirer. stating that he used Melvin Harris' book Investigating the Unexplained as a source, rather than the article or Hines' book, and that he gave Harris credit but forgot the quotation marks.

== Bibliography ==
- Baker, Robert A. (1963), A Stress Analysis of a Strapless Evening Gown, and Other Essays for a Scientific Age, New York: Prentice Hall, ISBN 0-13-852608-7, OCLC 338410
- Baker, Robert A. (1963), Psychology In The Wry, Princeton, New Jersey: Van Nostrand Company, ISBN 0-442-09861-8, OCLC 656894
- Baker, Robert Allen; Nietzel, Michael T. (1985), Private Eyes: 101 Knights : a Survey of American Detective Fiction, 1922-1984, Bowling Green, Ohio: Popular Press, ISBN 0-87972-330-0
- Baker, Robert A. (1990), They Call It Hypnosis, Amherst, New York: Prometheus Books, ISBN 0-87975-576-8
- Baker, Robert A.; Nickell, Joe (1992), Missing Pieces: How to Investigate Ghosts, Ufos, Psychics, & Other Mysteries, Amherst, New York: Prometheus Books, ISBN 0-87975-729-9
- Baker, Robert A. (1996), Hidden Memories: Voices and Visions from Within, Amherst, New York: Prometheus Books, ISBN 0-87975-576-8
- Baker, Robert A. (1996), Mind Games: Are We Obsessed With Therapy?, Amherst, New York: Prometheus Books, ISBN 1-57392-071-1
- Baker, Robert A. (1998), Baker, Robert A. (ed.), Child Sexual Abuse and False Memory Syndrome, Amherst, New York: Prometheus Books, ISBN 1-57392-182-3
