= Our Nig =

1859 autobiographical novel by Harriet E. Wilson

Our Nig: Sketches from the Life of a Free Black
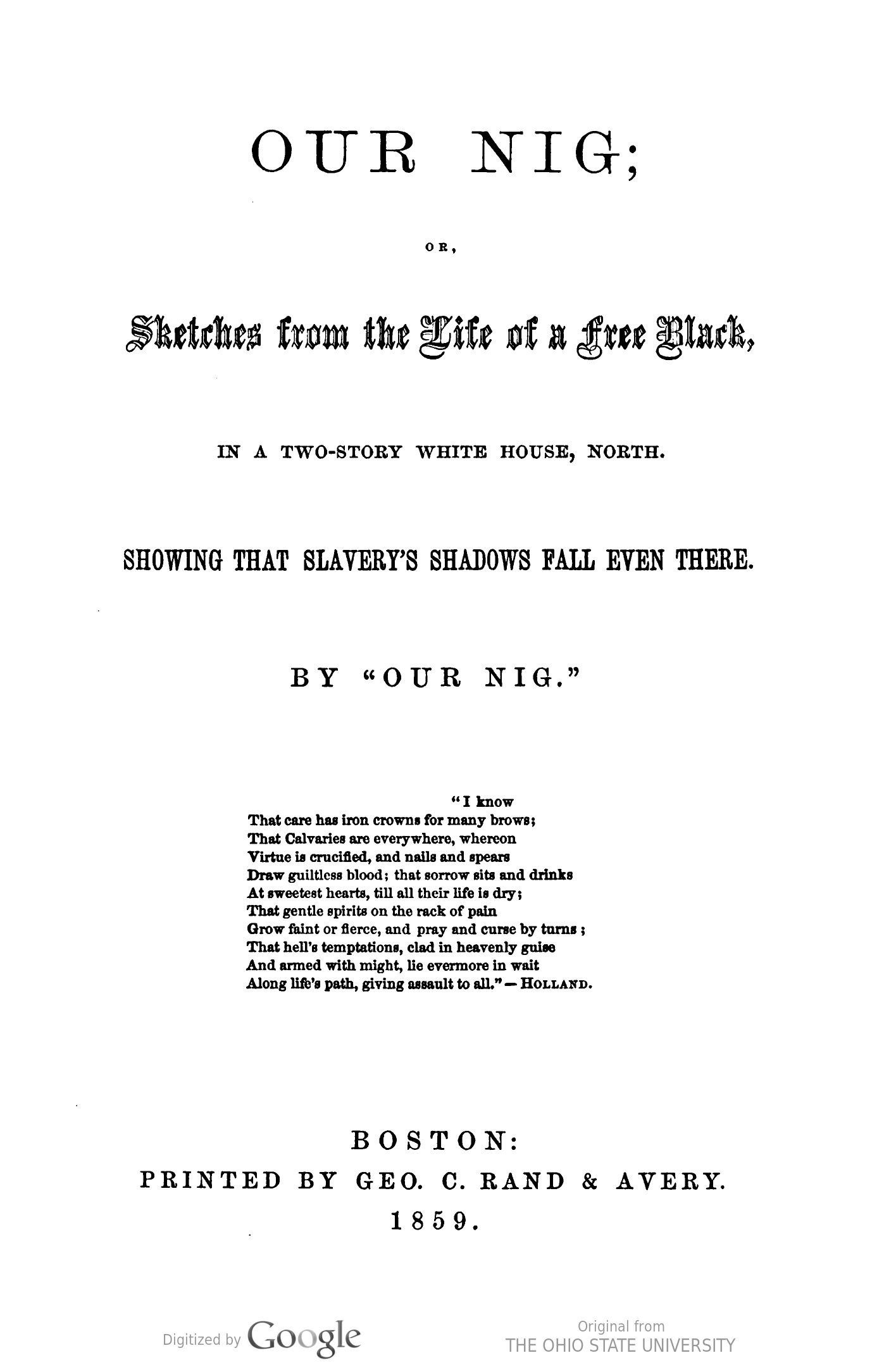
- Original title page (1859)
- Author: Harriet E. Wilson
- Language: English
- Genre: Novel
- Publisher: Geo. C. Rand & Avery
- Publication date: 1859; 167 years ago
- Publication place: United States
- Media type: Print - hardback and paperback
- Pages: 131 pages
- ISBN: 978-0-486-44561-8 (2005 paperback edition)
- Text: Our Nig: Sketches from the Life of a Free Black at Wikisource

Our Nig: Sketches from the Life of a Free Black is an autobiographical novel by Harriet E. Wilson. First published in 1859, it was rediscovered in 1981 by Henry Louis Gates Jr. and was subsequently reissued with an introduction by Gates (London: Allison & Busby, 1984). Our Nig has since been republished in several other editions. It was long considered the first novel published by an African-American woman in North America, though that record is now contested by another manuscript found by Gates, The Bondwoman's Narrative, which may have been written a few years earlier.

== Plot summary ==
=== Beginning ===
Our Nig opens with the story of Mag Smith, a white woman who lives in the northern United States. She has been seduced and left with a child born out-of-wedlock. After the child dies, Mag moves away to a place where no one knows her. In this new town, she meets a "kind-hearted African" man named Jim who falls in love with her. Impoverished, she soon realizes that she can either marry Jim or become a beggar. Jim and Mag marry and they have two children, a daughter, Frado, and an unnamed son.

Jim becomes sick and dies, leaving Mag to provide for their children. Embittered, she allows Seth, one of Jim's business partners, to become her common-law husband. Eventually, Mag and Seth decide they must leave town to search for work, and do not want to take both of the children. He suggests they send her daughter Frado to live with and work for the Bellmonts, a lower middle-class white family who live nearby. Mag, indifferent, agrees. Six-year-old Frado is dropped off at the Bellmonts under the pretense that Mag will be back to pick her up later in the day.

After a few days, the Bellmonts and Frado realize Mag never intended to return. Mr. Bellmont is portrayed as kind and humane but Mrs. Bellmont is the complete opposite. The Bellmonts have five children, three boys, Jack, James, and Lewis (the latter two are not currently living with the family) and two girls (sickly Jane and irascible Mary). Mr. Bellmont's sister, Abby, also lives with the family. The family debates whether or not to keep Frado, and if they do, where she will sleep. Frado is sent to live in a separate part of the house that she will soon outgrow. The following day, Mrs. Bellmont calls for Frado early in the morning and puts her to work in the kitchen, washing dishes, preparing food, etc.

=== Life with the Bellmonts ===
Jack accepts Frado since her skin is not very dark. His sister Mary resents Frado being there and wants her to go to the County Home instead. Mrs. Bellmont is not happy with Frado living with them but puts her to work doing household chores, frequently upbraiding her and hitting her. Mr. Bellmont is kindlier but does not wish to interfere with his wife's right to rule the house and so does not protest Mrs. Bellmont's treatment of her. Frado now lives in a small room, an unfinished chamber over the kitchen. As a year passes, Frado accepts that she is part of the Bellmont family. Jack buys Frado a dog named Fido, who becomes her friend and eases her loneliness.

Frado is allowed to attend school with Mary. One afternoon on their way home, Mary tries to force Frado into a stream but falls in instead. Mary runs home to tell her mother that Frado pushed her into the water. Frado receives a whipping from Mrs. Bellmont while Jack tries to defend the girl.

Frado runs away; Mr. Bellmont, Jack and a visiting James search for her. After she is found she tells James that if God made him, Aunt Abby and Mrs. Bellmont white, then she dislikes God for making her black.

On the first day of spring a letter arrives from James about his declining health. He returns with his wife and son to visit the family. Mrs. Bellmont beats Frado senseless and says if she tells James, Mrs. Bellmont will "cut her tongue out".

By November, James' health starts to deteriorate further. Mary leaves home to stay with her brother Lewis. James requests that Frado stay by his bed side until further notice. Mrs. Bellmont discovers Frado reading the Bible and speaks to her husband about Frado going to the evening meetings.

James dies the following spring.

=== Illness and sorrow ===
After James' death, Frado suffers conflict, feeling she is unworthy to be in Heaven. She seeks the aid of Aunt Abby (Mr. Bellmont's sister), who teaches Frado about God and the Bible, invites her to a church meeting, and encourages her to believe in God and seek the passage of Heaven.

Mr. Bellmont grows concerned for Frado's health from her beatings by Mrs. Bellmont, and advises Frado to avoid them whenever she can. Before Mrs. Bellmont strikes her for taking too long to bring firewood, Frado threatens to stop working for her if she does. Mrs. Bellmont unexpectedly relents. After that incident, she whips the girl less frequently.

News arrives that Mary Bellmont has died of illness. Frado rejoices in the death of her tormentor, and considers leaving the Bellmonts, but Aunt Abby counsels her against it. Frado decides to wait until her indenture contract is over at the age of 18. In the course of time, Jane Bellmont leaves the house. Jack moves in with his wife, whom Mrs. Bellmont verbally abuses because of her poverty in Jack's absence. Frado helps Jack's wife escape Mrs. Bellmont's tormenting.

When Frado turns 18, arrangements are made for her to sew for the Moore family. Due to her ailing health, she slowly becomes unable to work. She moves to a shelter where two elderly women take care of her for two years. For a while, she is nursed by Mrs. Moore, but after her husband leaves, Frado is forced to find work. She eventually is employed by a poor woman in Massachusetts who instructs her on making bonnets.

=== Aftermath ===
Though growing feebler and declining in health, Frado makes substantial wages. Despite three years of failing health, a few years later Frado moves to Singleton. She marries a fugitive slave named Samuel but finds that her back has been more seriously marked by beatings than his. He constantly leaves her to go "lecture" on the abolitionist circuit. During his travels, Frado is at home with little money. She must depend on herself alone, especially during the birth of her child.

During Samuel's absence, Frado becomes sick again. She takes her child and finds shelter in the home of a poor woman, where she later recovers. She receives word that her husband has died of yellow fever in New Orleans. Forced to find work, Frado travels through the different towns of Massachusetts. After a friend (Horatio W. Foster, 1816–1860, manufactured Foster's Mountain Compound) gives her a recipe for turning gray hair back to its original color, she maintains herself by making and selling the preparation.

The third person narrator concludes the story by relating the destinies of all its characters. Mr. and Mrs. Bellmont, Aunt Abby, Jack, and his wife have all died. Jane and her husband Henry, Susan (James' wife) and her son all have become old. No one remembers Frado. The last line of the book ends with "but she will never cease to track them till beyond mortal vision". Even though the families she worked for may have forgotten about Frado, she still remembers them.

== List of characters ==
- Mr. Bellmont - The patriarch of the Bellmont family.
- Mrs. Bellmont - The matriarch of the Bellmont family, tyrannical and capricious.
- Mag Smith - The mother of Frado, a poverty-stricken white woman.
- Jim - Mag's black husband and Frado's father.
- Seth Shipley - Jim's partner, later Mag's common-law husband.
- Frado - The protagonist of the novel.
- Mary Bellmont - Most active daughter in the household.
- Jack Bellmont - The youngest of the three sons belonging to the Bellmont household.
- Jane Bellmont - Sickly daughter of the family.
- James Bellmont - The middle son of the Bellmonts.
- Lewis Bellmont - The eldest son of the Bellmonts.
- Fido - Frado's dog.
- Aunt Abby - Mr. Bellmont's sister.

== Literary criticism ==
John Ernest in Economies of Identity: Harriet E. Wilson's Our Nig argues that Wilson's book was marginalized by a white audience because it appealed directly to a "colored audience". The distribution of Our Nig: Sketches in the Life of a Free Black was limited, and not appreciated by northern abolitionists because Wilson called for awareness of the abuse and "shadow of slavery" that existed even in the Northern United States. Ernest asserts that Wilson risked undermining the paradigm that African-American narratives portrayed of the "New England ideal".

Robin Bernstein in Racial Innocence: Performing American Childhood from Slavery to Civil Rights argued that the novel responds critically to Harriet Beecher Stowe's novel, Uncle Tom's Cabin, and to other works of abolitionist fiction that debate whether black children who die may become angels.

Cynthia J. Davis's article "Speaking the Body's Pain: Harriet Wilson's Our Nig" argues and analyzes the alternative representations of a black woman that Harriet Wilson presents. Davis includes other critics' comments and perspectives in order to come to her own conclusions. "One marker of the way in which Our Nig 'signifies' on dominant representations is the fact that, in light of the extreme sexualization of black women's bodies, it is a white woman whom Wilson represents as sexual — Frado's mother Mag, but not Frado herself." Wilson presents a challenging view of a white woman and a black woman. Although Frado is born to a white mother, because her father is black and she has identifiably African features, she is considered black. She defies convention, as she is not promiscuous. But, her white mother lost her virginity before marriage, had a child out of wedlock, and married twice.

Eric Gardner's article, "'This Attempt of Their Sister': Harriet Wilson's Our Nig from Printer to Readers", explores why the novel initially escaped notice and was not widely publicized. He argues that "of the owners of Our Nig who have been traced, more than half were children…" (238). Many white abolitionists were not as concerned with the issue of race as they were with the issue of slavery, and Our Nig may have seemed unflattering to Northerners and abolitionists in its content; "Wilson depicts aspects of Northern life that abolitionists would have regretted" (242). Gardner concludes that although Wilson may have not received the support she wanted or even needed, publishing Our Nig may have succeeded in aiding Wilson to reach her goal of achieving "self-sufficiency and self-satisfaction…" (246). She did gain a faithful group of supporters, however small.

Lois Leveen's article, "Dwelling in the House of Oppression: The Spatial, Racial, and Textual Dynamics of Harriet Wilson's Our Nig", incorporates her view on the "two story house" symbolizing the ties that bind her. The substandard space which Frado is given makes her believe in her low status. She starts to believe that she must fit within these spatial restrictions. Frado knows only what she has been surrounded by; the Bellmonts and others in their society believe the individual is determined by race. Frado cannot break the chains of this household where such inhumane conditions are set, so breaking the chains in her mind would be equally, if not more difficult, to escape.

The physical prison, in which she has been doomed to live in, translates into her mental incapacity. Although she leaves the "white house", due to the damage and treatment she received there, she will never be free. Growing up, that environment is all Frado knew, it's all the familiarity that she had to compare every other upcoming experience to. The fact that she grew up in the North, a free place, further incapacitates her. For there is no escape for her, there is no geographical positive. She has no sense of freedom because she was raised as a prisoner in a free land and was cheated out of ever claiming it. She had no choices, she had no will, she had only her thoughts and her pain to look to. She can leave the walls that held her restrained in the past but she cannot leave her mind, thoughts and memories; they hold her eternally captive.

== Reception ==
Our Nig did not sell well, partly because rather than criticizing slavery in the South, it also indicts the economy of the northern states. Specifically, the novel lambasts the practice of keeping poor people as indentured servants, and the poor treatment of blacks by whites. Critic David Dowling, in "Other and More Terrible Evils: Anticapitalist Rhetoric in Harriet Wilson's Our Nig and Proslavery Propaganda", states that northern abolitionists did not publicize her book because it criticized the North.

== See also ==
- African American literature
- Narrative of the Life of Frederick Douglass, an American Slave
- The Bondwoman's Narrative by Hannah Crafts a preface by Henry Louis Gates Jr., describing his and its acquisition, verification and publication
- Free Negro
- Free person of color
