= The Purple Jar =

1796 short story by Maria Edgeworth

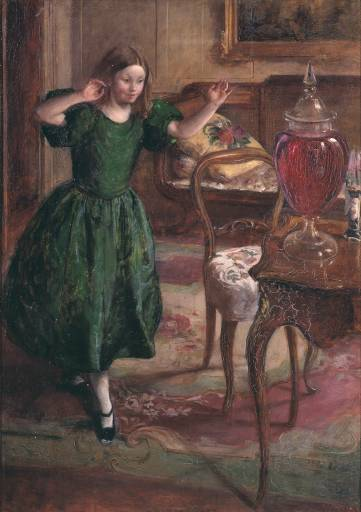
Rosamund and The Purple Jar, 1900 painting

"The Purple Jar" is a well-known short story by Maria Edgeworth (1768-1849), an Anglo-Irish writer of novels and stories. "The Purple Jar" first was published in The Parent's Assistant (1796) and reappeared in Rosamond (1801). Edgeworth's parable of desire and disappointment is now popularly read as the story of a girl getting her first period or menstruation in general.

The story is about a young girl, Rosamond, who needs new pair of shoes but is attracted to a purple jar which she sees displayed in a shop window. When her mother gives her the choice of spending her money on shoes or the jar, she chooses the purple jar. "You might be disappointed", her mother cautions, adding that Rosamond will not be able to buy new shoes until the next month. When the girl gets home, she discovers that the jar was not purple but clear and filled with a dark liquid. She cries: "I didn't want this black stuff!" Adding to her disappointment, her father refuses to take her out in public because she looks slovenly without good shoes.

In the 21st century, scholars have also read this story as a parable of consumer capitalism.

== Cultural references ==
As Hollis Robbins has shown, many contemporary women authors refer to "The Purple Jar." Elizabeth Gaskell's Mary Barton (1849) alludes to Edgeworth's story. The character Rose Campbell in Louisa May Alcott's Eight Cousins (1875) refers to the story:

I always thought it very unfair in her mother not to warn the poor thing a little bit; and she was regularly mean when Rosamond asked for a bowl to put the purple stuff in, and she said, in such a provoking way, 'I did not agree to lend you a bowl, but I will, my dear.' Ugh! I always want to shake that hateful woman, though she was a moral mamma.

A character in E. Nesbit's 1913 novel Wet Magic alludes to the "icy voice" of Rosamond’s mother, "the one who was so hateful about the purple jar."

"The Purple Jar" was read and commented on by Princess Victoria, the actress Fanny Kemble, Theodore Roosevelt (who admired it), and Eudora Welty (who did not).

Miss Milliment in Elizabeth Jane Howard's The Light Years, volume 1 of The Cazalet Chronicles, thinks, "I am as bad as Rosamond in "The Purple Jar"" when she procrastinates over getting her shoes mended.

Rudyard Kipling referred to 'Three superb glass jars ... of the sort that led Rosamond to parting with her shoes' in his 1902 story Wireless (short story).
