= Sinah Estelle Kelley =

American chemist (1916–1982)

- Born: April 23, 1916; New York City
- Died: December 21, 1982 (aged 66)
- Education: Ethical Culture Fieldston School, Radcliffe College, New York University
- Known for: Worked on the mass production of penicillin.
- Scientific career
- Fields: Chemistry
- Institutions: Federal laboratories in Indiana, Pennsylvania, and Illinois during World War II; U. S. Department of Agriculture; Atomic Energy Commission

Sinah Estelle Kelley (April 23, 1916 – December 21, 1982) was an American chemist who worked on the mass production of penicillin.

== Early life and education ==
Sinah Estelle Kelley was born in New York City in 1916. Her father was the managing editor (1922–1934) of the New York Amsterdam News, William Melvin Kelley Sr., and her mother was Gladys Caution Kelley, a probation officer. Her much younger brother (from her father's second marriage) is author William M. Kelley Jr.

Kelley attended the Ethical Culture Fieldston School of New York City, and was a 1934 graduate of the high school there. Kelley began her scientific studies at Radcliffe College, under organic chemistry professor Louis Fieser, and during summer internships at Harlem Hospital.

== Career ==
After graduating from Radcliffe in 1938, Sinah Kelley took some graduate courses at New York University, and worked at federal laboratories in Indiana, Pennsylvania, and Illinois during World War II. She stayed in Peoria, Illinois, after the war, with a team working on the mass production of penicillin for the U. S. Department of Agriculture. More specifically, she worked in the lab as part of the Fermentation Division, where she performed chemical analyses on sugar and other products of fermentation. Though Kelley did not hold an advanced degree, she was listed an author on several scientific papers from this group, with titles such as "Production of Fumaric Acid by Rhizopus arrhizus" (1959) and "Production of Itaconic Acid by Aspergillus terreus in 20-Liter Fermentors" (1952).

In 1958, she returned to New York to work on the effects of strontium 90, working with how to stabilize it with flame photometry at an Atomic Energy Commission laboratory. She retired from that work in the 1970s.

== Personal life and legacy ==
While she lived in Peoria, Kelley was the only African-American member of the Mayor's Interracial Committee. Sinah Estelle Kelley died in 1982, age 66. Her papers are part of the William Melvin Kelley Family Papers, at Emory University.
