= Julia C. Collins =

American educator and writer

- Born: c. 1842; Northern United States
- Died: November 25, 1865 (aged 22–23); Williamsport, Pennsylvania
- Spouse: Stephen C. Collins (also known as Simon C. Collins)
- Children: Annie C. Collins (Mrs. John L. Caution)
- Writing career
- Genres: Fiction, essay
- Notable works: Curse of Caste, or the Slave Bride

Julia C. Collins (c. 1842 – November 25, 1865), was an African American schoolteacher in Williamsport, Pennsylvania, who in 1864 and 1865 contributed essays and other writings to The Christian Recorder, a publication of the African Methodist Episcopal Church. Starting in January 1865, her novel, The Curse of Caste, or the Slave Bride, was serialized in the pages of the Christian Recorder. The novel remains unfinished due to Collins' death from Tuberculosis in November 1865.

In 2006, William L. Andrews of University of North Carolina at Chapel Hill and Mitch Kachun of Western Michigan University collected Collins' writings and her unfinished novel and published them, with commentary and notes, through Oxford University Press.

== Life and literary work ==
=== Life ===
Little is known about Julia Collins' life. Scholars believe she was born a free woman in the northern United States, though her birth name and birthdate are unknown. Only one African American woman named "Julia" appears in the 1860 Williamsport, Pennsylvania census, a 17-year-old Julia Green who was living with the family of Enoch Gilchrist, a black abolitionist and Underground Railroad conductor. It is plausible that the two Julias are the same person, but cannot be verified. Indicating that the author was educated and well-read, Collins referenced Alexander Pope, William Shakespeare, Alfred, Lord Tennyson, Henry Wadsworth Longfellow, and classical antiquity in her essays.

What is known about Collins comes primarily from references to her in the Christian Recorder. In the April 16, 1864 issue, Enoch Gilchrist announced that Julia Collins was appointed as schoolteacher for the African-American children in Williamsport, Pennsylvania. There was no school building open to African American children at that time. The school committee authorized a teacher's salary, but the teacher had to provide the materials and space. The school was likely located in the African-American section near the Susquehanna River and the city's African Methodist Episcopal Church. It is not known where Collins lived before April 1864.

More is known about her husband, Stephen Carlisle Collins. Stephen was born a free man in Pennsylvania and lived in Williamsport. During the Civil War, he was an officer's servant, before enlisting in the 6th United States Colored Infantry Regiment. For a period of time after the war, he operated a barber shop in Williamsport and served as commander of the Fribley Post of the Grand Army of the Republic, a veterans' organization for Civil War soldiers. Barbering and school-teaching were higher-status occupations for African Americans in the 19th century, which meant the Collinses would have likely been well-respected and connected in the Williamsport community.

Julia Collins died on November 25, 1865. She became a member of the African Methodist Episcopal Church on her deathbed. As reported in The Christian Recorder, she left "motherless children", which leads to speculations that she was in her twenties when she died. These children have been identified as Sarah and Annie Collins. Since Stephen was previously married, the eldest daughter Sarah, born around 1858, was likely not Julia Collins’ biological daughter. Born around 1862, Annie was raised by her grandparents after her mother's death. Annie worked as a domestic servant, married lumberer John L. Caution in 1884, and died suddenly in 1889.

=== Literary work ===
Collins' novel, The Curse of Caste, or The Slave Bride, was published weekly in the Christian Recorder over a period of eight months in 1865. The story focuses on racial identity, interracial marriage, and the injustices of American slavery and racism. The story abruptly ends just as the plot reaches the climax and resolution, as Collins died of tuberculosis in November 1865, leaving the novel unfinished. In 2006, Oxford University Press published the novel, including an introduction and two alternative endings written by the editors Mitch Kachun and William Andrews.

In addition to the novel, The Curse of Caste, Collins published six essays in the Christian Recorder over the course of ten months from April 19, 1864, to January 20, 1865. The essays are titled: "Mental Improvement", "School Teaching", "Intelligent Women", "A Letter from Oswego: Originality of Ideas", "Life is Earnest", and "Memory and Imagination". The first four essays are datelined "Williamsport, Pennsylvania", while the fourth and fifth are datelined "Oswego" and "Owego, New York". The essays convey a message of racial uplift and empowerment to the African-American community.

=== Literary reception ===
Mitch Kachun, associate professor of history at Western Michigan University, "rediscovered" The Curse of Caste while searching through the microfilm collection of the Christian Recorder. Along with colleague William L. Andrews, Kachun argues that the serialized novel is the first novel written by an African-American woman. The pair argue that previous novels written by African-American women – such as Our Nig (1859) by Harriet E. Wilson and Incidents in the Life of a Slave Girl (1861) by Harriet Ann Jacobs – are basically autobiographical. During a presentation at Saginaw Valley State University, Kachun remarked how it is unusual that Collins' characters are allowed to be married and (briefly) happy in a tumultuous America. Kachun speculated that "[Collins] is exploring what could be a happy ending, an empowering ending, in which marriage and civility are things that African American women can aspire to."

A few scholars argue that the statements by Kachun and Andrews are inaccurate and presumptuous. Harvard scholar Henry Louis Gates Jr. counters that many first novels are autobiographical fiction, and that Harriet E. Wilson's Our Nig (which he brought to light in 1982) is the first novel by an African-American woman. Gates also retorts that the book by Collins is not "rediscovered" as he published it in microfiche form in 1989 as part of "The Black Periodical Fiction Project". At Gates' request, Andrews and Kachun added a footnote in the book acknowledging this. Sven Birkerts, a book reviewer for The New York Times, argues that the "sketchily developed romance" novel is simply not "worthy of the canonically foundational 'first novel by an African-American woman slot.'" He believes arguing the importance of this unfinished and editorially presumptuous novel takes away from the achievement of vital African-American literary works.

No matter the stances on the classification of The Curse of Caste, scholars believe the novel provides significant views on racial identity, interracial romance, hidden African ancestry, and gender ideologies. The story illuminates how racial prejudice persisted across generations and has the power to deprive people of trust social and emotional freedom. Veta Smith Tucker of the African American Review states that the lack of knowledge about Collins gives scholars great opportunity for discovery and calls the piecing together of facts "literary archeology." Collins used the vehicle of the Christian Recorder to share her voice with a broad audience, and Tucker hopes Collins' messages of self-improvement, racial uplift, and gender ideologies resonate with people today.

In June 2010, a Pennsylvania State Historical Marker was installed on Williamsport’s River Walk, near the presumed site of Collins' home and school, to recognize the importance of her life and work.
