= Harriet E. Wilson =

African-American novelist (1825–1900)

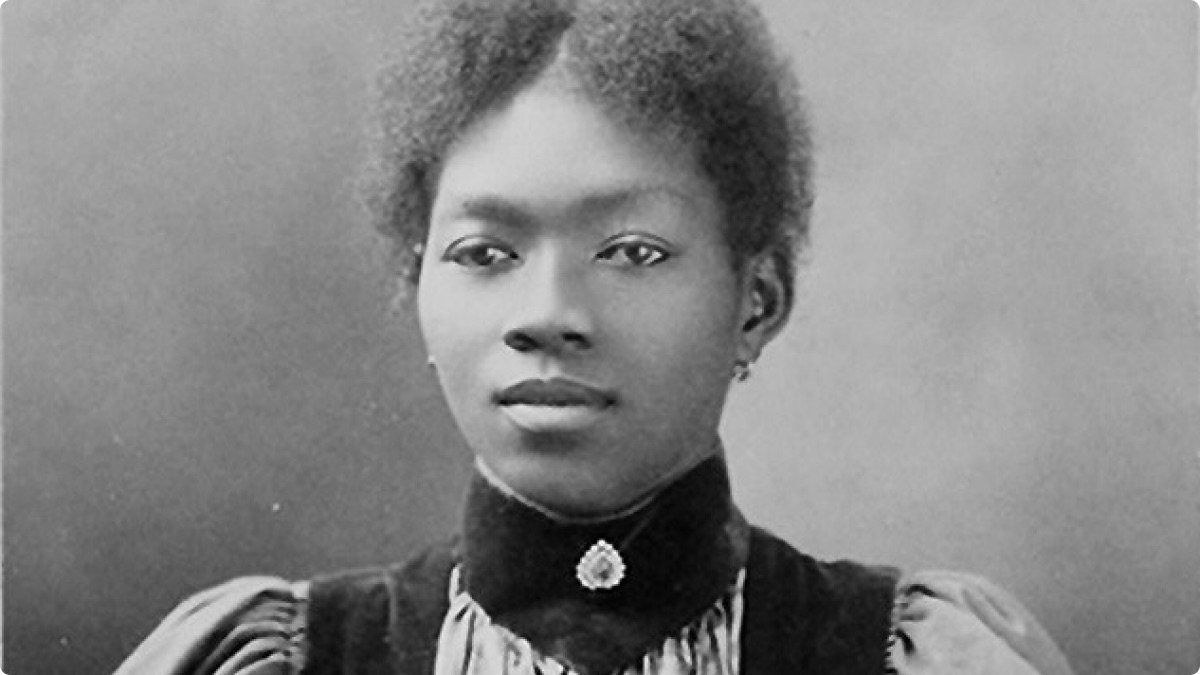
- Born: Harriet E. Adams; March 15, 1825; Milford, New Hampshire, United States
- Died: June 28, 1900 (aged 75); Quincy, Massachusetts, United States
- Resting place: Mount Wollaston Cemetery
- Occupation: Novelist
- Spouse(s): Thomas Wilson, m. 1851 (died); John Gallatin Robinson, m. 1870
- Writing career
- Notable work: Our Nig (1859)

Harriet E. Wilson (March 15, 1825 – June 28, 1900) was an African-American novelist. She was the first African American to publish a novel in North America.

Her novel Our Nig, or Sketches from the Life of a Free Black was published anonymously in 1859 in Boston, Massachusetts, and was not widely known. The novel was discovered in 1982 by the scholar Henry Louis Gates Jr., who documented it as the first African-American novel published in the United States.

Born a free person of color (free Negro) in New Hampshire, Wilson was orphaned when young and bound until the age of 18 as an indentured servant. She struggled to make a living after that, marrying twice. Her only son George died at the age of seven in the poor house, where she had placed him while trying to survive as a widow. She wrote one novel. Wilson later was associated with the Spiritualist church, was paid on the public lecture circuit for her lectures about her life, and worked as a housekeeper in a boarding house.

== Biography ==
Born Harriet E. "Hattie" Adams in Milford, New Hampshire, she was the mixed-race daughter of Margaret Ann (or Adams) Smith, a washerwoman of Irish ancestry, and Joshua Green, an African-American "hooper of barrels" of mixed African and Indian ancestry. After her father died when Hattie was young, her mother abandoned Hattie at the farm of Nehemiah Hayward Jr., a wealthy Milford farmer "connected to the Hutchinson Family Singers". As an orphan, Adams was bound by the courts as an indentured servant to the Hayward family, a customary way for society at the time to arrange support and education for orphans. The intention was that, in exchange for labor, the orphan child would be given room, board and training in life skills, so that she could later make her way in society.

From their documentary research, the scholars P. Gabrielle Foreman and Reginald H. Pitts believe that the Hayward family were the inspiration for the "Bellmont" family depicted in Our Nig. (This was the family who held the young "Frado" in indentured servitude, abusing her physically and mentally from the age of six to 18. Foreman and Pitts' research material was incorporated in supporting sections of the 2004 edition of Our Nig.)

After the end of her indentured servitude at the age of 18, Hattie Adams (as she was then known) worked as a house servant and a seamstress in households in southern New Hampshire.

=== Marriage and family ===
Adams married Thomas Wilson in Milford on October 6, 1851. An escaped slave, Wilson had been traveling around New England giving lectures based on his life. Although he continued to lecture periodically in churches and town squares, he told Hattie that he had never been a slave and that he had created the story to gain support from abolitionists.

Wilson abandoned Harriet soon after they married. Pregnant and ill, Harriet Wilson was sent to the Hillsborough County, New Hampshire Poor Farm in Goffstown, where her only son, George Mason Wilson, was born. His probable birth date was June 15, 1852. Soon after George's birth, Wilson reappeared and took the two away from the Poor Farm. He returned to sea, where he served as a sailor, and died soon after.

As a widow, Harriet Wilson returned her son George to the care of the Poor Farm, as she could not make enough money to support them both and provide for his care while she worked. However, George died at the age of seven on February 16, 1860, of bilious fever.

After that, Wilson moved to Boston, hoping for more work opportunities. On September 29, 1870, Wilson married again, to John Gallatin Robinson in Boston. An apothecary, he was either a native of Sherbrooke, Quebec or of Woodbury, Connecticut. Robinson was of English and German ancestry; he was nearly 18 years younger than Wilson. From 1870 to 1877, they resided at 46 Carver Street, after which they appear to have separated. After that date, city directories list Wilson and Robinson in separate lodgings in Boston's South End. No record has been found of a divorce, but divorces were infrequent at the time.

=== Writing a novel ===
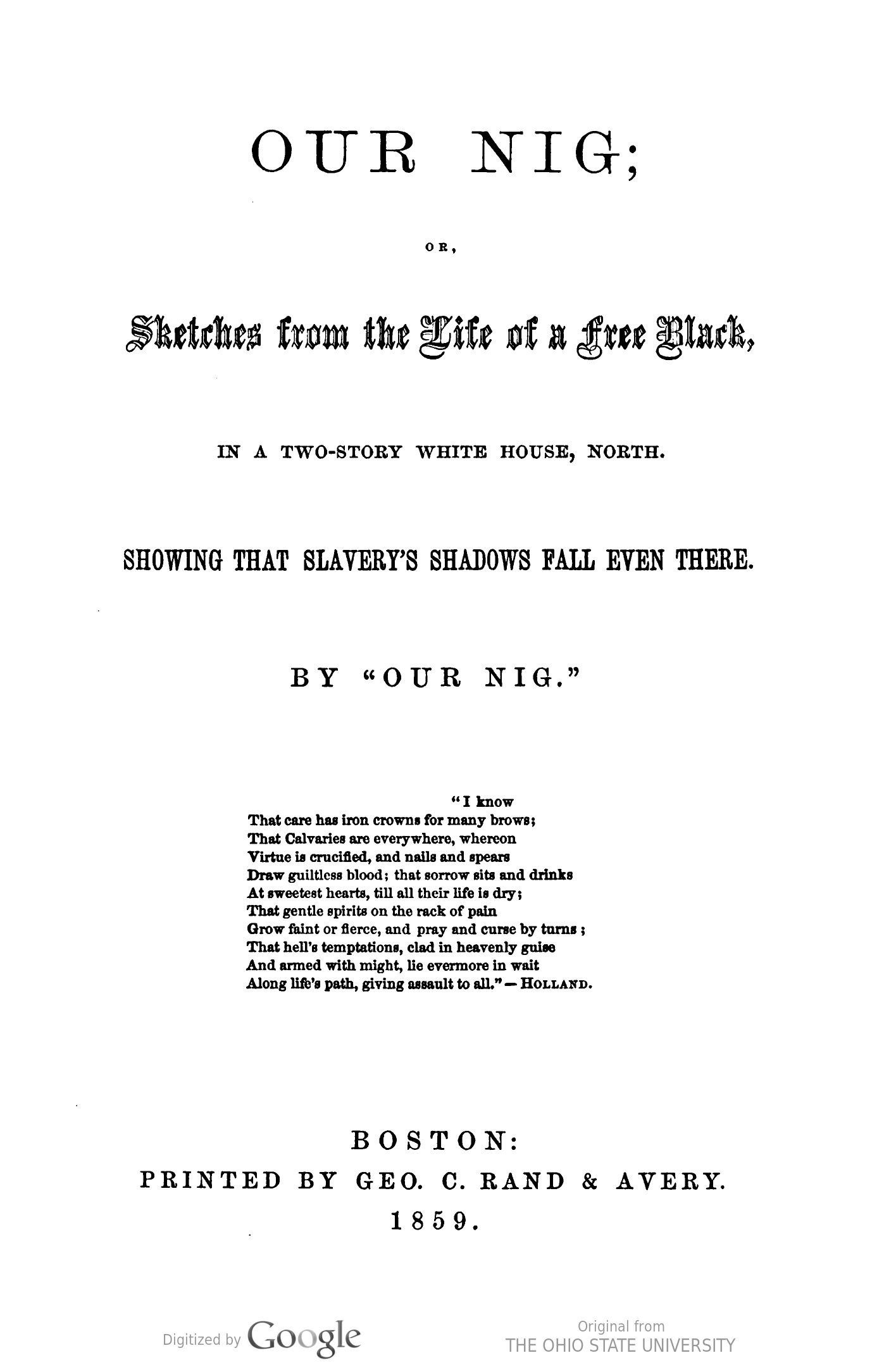
Original title page of Our Nig, published by George C. Rand and Avery (1859).

While living in Boston, Wilson wrote Our Nig. On August 14, 1859, she copyrighted it, and deposited a copy of the novel in the Office of the Clerk of the U.S. District Court of Massachusetts. On September 5, 1859, the novel was published anonymously by George C. Rand and Avery, a publishing firm in Boston. Wilson writes in the book's preface that she wrote the novel to raise money to help care for her sick child, George.

In 1863, Harriet Wilson appeared on the "Report of the Overseers of the Poor" for the town of Milford, New Hampshire. After 1863, she disappeared from records until 1867, when she was listed in the Boston Spiritualist newspaper, Banner of Light, as living in East Cambridge, Massachusetts. She subsequently moved across the Charles River to the city of Boston, where she became known in Spiritualist circles as "the colored medium." From 1867 to 1897, "Mrs. Hattie E. Wilson" was listed in the Banner of Light as a trance reader and lecturer. She was active in the local Spiritualist community, and she would give "lectures," either while entranced, or speaking normally, wherever she was wanted. She spoke at camp meetings, in theaters and meeting houses and in private homes throughout New England; she shared the podium with speakers such as Victoria Woodhull, Cora L. V. Scott and Andrew Jackson Davis. In 1870, Wilson traveled as far as Chicago, Illinois as a delegate to the American Association of Spiritualists convention. Wilson delivered lectures on labor reform and children's education. Although the texts of her talks have not survived, newspaper reports imply that she often spoke about her life experiences, providing sometimes trenchant and often humorous commentary.

Wilson worked as a Spiritualist nurse and healer ("clairvoyant physician"); as a "spiritual healer," she was also available for medical consultations and would make house calls. She was active in the organization and operation of Children's Progressive Lyceums, that served as Sunday Schools for the children of Spiritualists; she organized Christmas celebrations; she participated in skits and playlets; and at meetings she sometime sang as part of a quartet. She was also known for her floral centerpieces, and the candies she would make for the children were long remembered.

In addition, for nearly 20 years from 1879 to 1897, Wilson was the housekeeper of a boardinghouse in a two-story dwelling at 15 Village Street (near the present corner of East Berkeley Street and Tremont Streets in the South End.) She rented out rooms, collected rents and provided basic maintenance.

In Wilson's life after Our Nig, there is no evidence that she wrote anything else for publication.

On June 28, 1900, Hattie E. Wilson died in the Quincy Hospital in Quincy, Massachusetts.

== Competition for "first novel" ==
Scholar Henry Louis Gates Jr. rediscovered Our Nig in 1982 and documented it as the first novel by an African American to be published in the United States. His discovery and the novel gained national attention, and in 1984 it was republished by Allison & Busby with an introduction by Gates. It has subsequently been republished in several other editions.

In 2006, William L. Andrews, an English literature professor at the University of North Carolina at Chapel Hill, and Mitch Kachun, a history professor at Western Michigan University, brought to light Julia C. Collins' The Curse of Caste; or The Slave Bride (1865), first published in serial form in The Christian Recorder, newspaper of the AME Church. Publishing it in book form in 2006, they maintained that The Curse of Caste should be considered the first "truly imagined" novel by an African American to be published in the U.S. They argued that Our Nig was more autobiography than fiction.

Gates responded that numerous other novels and other works of fiction of the period were in some part based on real-life events and were in that sense autobiographical, but they were still considered novels. Examples include Fanny Fern's Ruth Hall (1854), Louisa May Alcott's Little Women (1868–69), and Hannah Webster Foster's The Coquette (1797).

The first known novel by an African American is William Wells Brown's Clotel; or, The President's Daughter (1853), published in the United Kingdom, where he was living at the time. The critic Sven Birkerts argued that the unfinished state of The Curse of Caste (Collins died before completing it) and its poor literary quality should disqualify it as the first building block of African-American literature. He contended the works by Wilson and Brown were more fully realized.

Eric Gardner thought that Our Nig did not receive critical acclaim from abolitionists when first published because it did not conform to the contemporary genre of slave narratives. He thinks the abolitionists may have refrained from promoting Our Nig because the novel recounts "slavery's shadow" in the North, where free blacks suffered as indentured servants and from racism. It does not offer the promise of freedom, and it features a protagonist who is assertive toward a white woman.

In her article "Dwelling in the House of Oppression: The Spatial, Racial, and Textual Dynamics of Harriet Wilson's Our Nig ", Lois Leveen argues that, although the novel is about a free black in the north, the "free black" is still oppressed. The "white house" of the novel represents, as Leveen puts it: "The model home for American society is built according to the spatial imperatives of slavery." Frado is a "free black", but she is treated as a lower-class person and is often abused as a slave would be. Leveen argues that Wilson was expressing her view that even the "free blacks" were not free in a racist society.

== Legacy and honors ==
Since Gates' work in 1982, Wilson has been recognized as the first African American to publish a novel in the United States. The Harriet Wilson Project commissioned a statue of Wilson in 2006—sculpted by Fern Cunningham, the statue is located in Bicentennial Park in Milford, New Hampshire. A historical marker honoring Wilson was unveiled by the Black Heritage Trail of New Hampshire in Milford on May 20, 2023. A second marker honoring Wilson, located at the Nehemiah Hayward Homestead in Milford, was unveiled in 2025.

== See also ==
- African-American literature
