= Bibliography of the Reconstruction era =

Era's main scholarly literature (1863–1877)

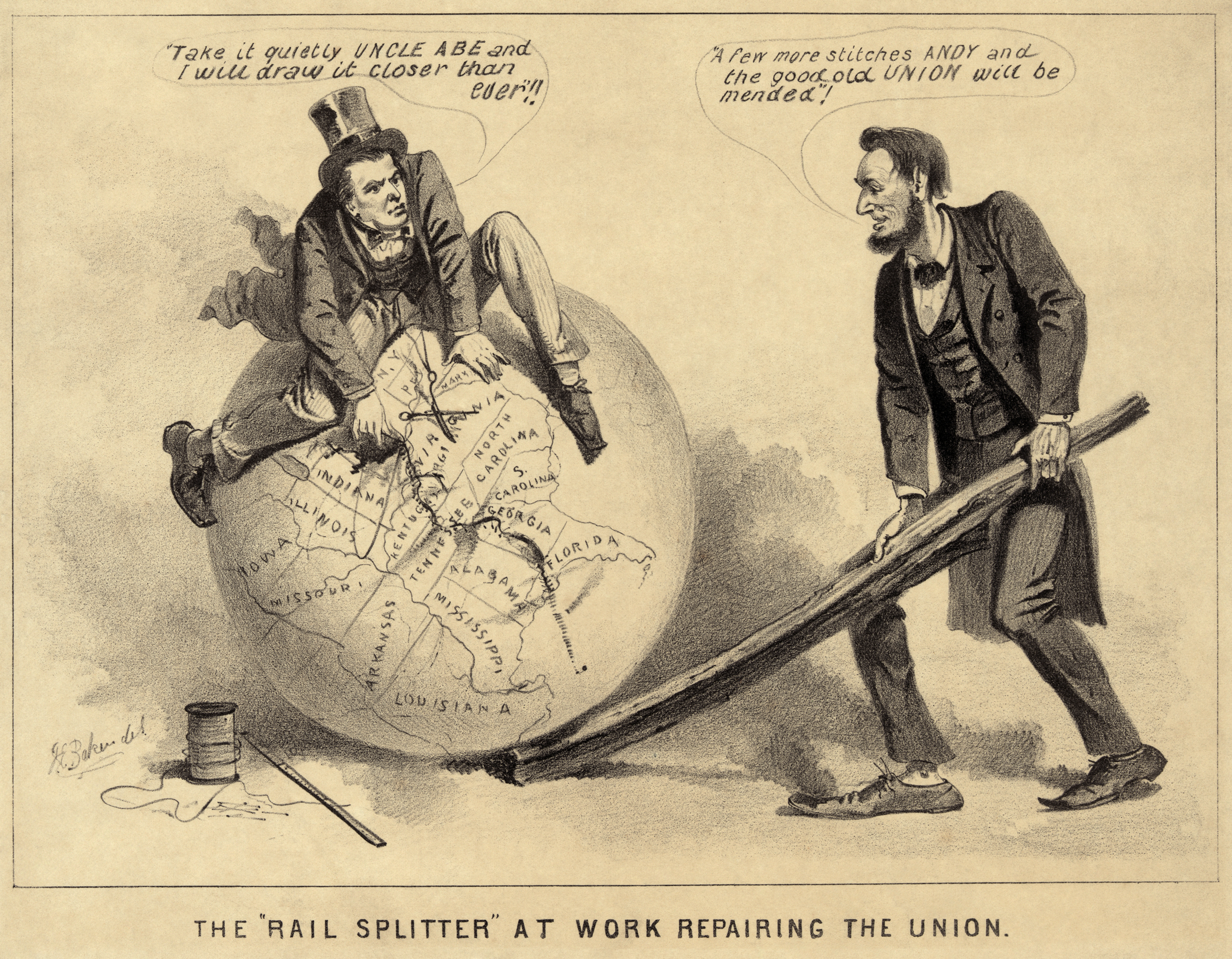
A political cartoon of Andrew Johnson and Abraham Lincoln, 1865, entitled "The Rail Splitter At Work Repairing the Union." The caption reads (Johnson): Take it quietly Uncle Abe and I will draw it closer than ever. (Lincoln): A few more stitches Andy and the good old Union will be mended.

This is a selected bibliography of the main scholarly books and articles of Reconstruction, the period after the American Civil War, 1863–1877 (or 1865 to 1877).

== Secondary sources ==
=== Surveys and reference ===
- Bowers, Claude G. (1929). The Tragic Era. The Revolution after Lincoln. Riverside. Provoked answer by Du Bois
- Brands, H. W. (2010). American Colossus: The Triumph of Capitalism, 1865–1900. Doubleday.
- Brown, Thomas J., ed. Reconstructions: New Perspectives on Postbellum America (2006) essays by 8 scholars excerpt and text search
- Du Bois, W.E.B. Black Reconstruction in America 1860–1880 (1935), 1998 edition reissued with introduction by David Levering Lewis ISBN 0-684-85657-3.) Explores the economics and politics of the era from a labor perspective; an early rejection of the Dunning School viewpoint.
- Du Bois, W.E.B. "Reconstruction and its Benefits," American Historical Review, 15 (July, 1910), 781–799 JSTOR
- Dunning, William Archibald. Reconstruction: Political & Economic, 1865–1877 (1905). Blames Carpetbaggers for what it deems to have been a failed Reconstruction. online edition
- Fitzgerald, Michael W. Splendid Failure: Postwar Reconstruction in the American South (2007), 224 pp; excerpt and text search
- Fleming, Walter L. The Sequel of Appomattox, A Chronicle of the Reunion of the States (1918). Written with viewpoint of Dunning School.
- Foner, Eric and Mahoney, Olivia. America's Reconstruction: People and Politics After the Civil War. ISBN 0-8071-2234-3, short well-illustrated survey
- Foner, Eric. Reconstruction: America's Unfinished Revolution, 1863–1877 (1988) ISBN 0-06-015851-4. Award-winning history and most detailed synthesis of original and previous scholarship.
- Foner, Eric. "Reconstruction Revisited" in Reviews in American History, Vol. 10, No. 4, The Promise of American History: Progress and Prospects (Dec., 1982), pp. 82–100, review of the historiography, online in Project MUSE
- Foner, Eric. Forever Free: The Story of Emancipation and Reconstruction. 2005. 268 pp.
- Ford, Lacy K., ed. A Companion to the Civil War and Reconstruction. Blackwell, 2005. 518 pp.
- Franklin, John Hope. Reconstruction after the Civil War (1961), University of Chicago Press, 280 pp. ISBN 0-226-26079-8. Explores the brevity of the North's military occupation of the South, limited power of former slaves, influence of moderate southerners, flaws in constitutions drawn by Radical state governments, and reasons for downfall of Reconstruction.
- Gates Jr., Henry Louis. Stony the Road: Reconstruction, White Supremacy, and the Rise of Jim Crow. 2019. 320 pp.
- Guelzo, Allen C. Reconstruction: A Concise History (2018), 180 pp by a leading scholar
- Henry, Robert Selph. The Story of Reconstruction (1938).
- Jenkins, Wilbert L. Climbing up to Glory: A Short History of African Americans during the Civil War and Reconstruction. SR Books, 2002. 285 pp.
- Litwack, Leon. Been in the Storm So Long (1979). Pulitzer Prize
- Milton, George Fort. The Age of Hate: Andrew Johnson and the Radicals. (1930).
- Oberholtzer, Ellis Paxson. A History of the United States since the Civil War. Vol 1 and vol 2 (1917). Based on Dunning School
- Perman, Michael. Emancipation and Reconstruction (2003). 144 pp.
- Randall, J. G. The Civil War and Reconstruction (1953). Long the standard survey, with elaborate bibliography
- Rhodes, James G. History of the United States from the Compromise of 1850 to the McKinley-Bryan Campaign of 1896. Volume: 6. (1920). 1865–72; Volume: 7. (1920). 1872–77; Highly detailed narrative by Pulitzer prize winner; argues was a political disaster because it violated the rights of white Southerners. vol 6 online at Google.books vol 7 in Google.books
- Richardson, Heather Cox. West from Appomattox: The Reconstruction of America after the Civil War (2007)
- Richter, William L. The A to Z of the Civil War and Reconstruction (2009) excerpt and text search; earlier version was Historical Dictionary of the Civil War and Reconstruction (2004)
- Schouler, James. History of the United States of America: Under the Constitution vol. 7. 1865–1877. The Reconstruction Period (1917) online
- Stalcup, Brenda. ed. Reconstruction: Opposing Viewpoints (Greenhaven Press: 1995); uses primary documents to present opposing viewpoints.
- Stampp, Kenneth M. The Era of Reconstruction, 1865–1877 (1967); short survey
- Stampp, Kenneth M. and Leon M. Litwack, eds. Reconstruction: An Anthology of Revisionist Writings, (1969), essays by scholars
- Trefousse, Hans L. Historical Dictionary of Reconstruction Greenwood (1991), 250 entries excerpt and text search
- White, Richard The Republic for Which It Stands, Oxford University Press, 2017.
- Williams, T. Harry. "An Analysis of Some Reconstruction Attitudes" The Journal of Southern History, Vol. 12, No. 4. (Nov., 1946), pp. 469–486. JSTOR
- Wilson, Woodrow. The Reconstruction of the Southern States (1901); interpretive essay by Wilson, written before his election as president in 1912.
- Zuczek, Richard. Encyclopedia of the Reconstruction Era (2 vol. 2006)

=== National politics ===
- Beale, Howard K. The Critical Year: A Study of Andrew Johnson and Reconstruction (New York: Harcourt Brace, 1930; reprint 1958); influential "revisionist" thesis argument that Reconstruction was controlled by Northern industrialists
- Beale, Howard K. "The Tariff and Reconstruction," American Historical Review (1930) 35#2 pp. 276–294 in JSTOR; concise statement of Beale-Beard interpretation
- Belz, Herman. A New Birth of Freedom: The Republican Party and Freedman's Rights, 1861–1866 (2000) pro-moderate.
- Benedict, Michael Les. The Impeachment and Trial of Andrew Johnson (1999), pro-Radical.
- Benedict, Michael Les. A Compromise of Principle: Congressional Republicans and Reconstruction (1974) pro-Radical
- Benedict, Michael Les. "Preserving the Constitution: The Conservative Bases of Radical Reconstruction," Journal of American History vol 61 #1 (1974) pp. 65–90, online in JSTOR
- Benedict, Michael Les. "Constitutional History and Constitutional Theory: Reflections on Ackerman, Reconstruction, and the Transformation of the American Constitution." Yale Law Journal Vol: 108. Issue: 8. 1999. pp 2011–2038.
- Blaine, James. Twenty Years of Congress: From Lincoln to Garfield. With a review of the events which led to the political revolution of 1860 (1886). By Republican Congressional leader
- Blight, David. Race and Reunion: The Civil War in American Memory (2001). Examines national memory of Civil War, Reconstruction, and Redemption, north–south reunion, and the retreat from equality for African Americans.
- Blum, Edward J. "Reforging the White Republic: Race, Religion, and American Nationalism, 1865–1898" (2005).
- Brandwein, Pamela; "Slavery as an Interpretive Issue in the Reconstruction Congresses" Law & Society Review. Volume: 34. Issue: 2. 2000. pp 315+ shows Democratic party history, grounded on white supremacy was crucial in legitimating the Court's narrow doctrinal interpretations of the Fourteenth Amendment.
- Burg, Robert W. "Amnesty, Civil Rights, And The Meaning Of Liberal Republicanism, 1862–1872". American Nineteenth Century History 2003 4(3): 29–60.
- Dunning, William A. "The Constitution of the United States in Reconstruction" in Political Science Quarterly Vol. 2, No. 4 (Dec., 1887), pp. 558–602 JSTOR
- Dunning, William A. "Military Government in the South During Reconstruction" Political Science Quarterly Vol. 12, No. 3 (Sep., 1897), pp. 381–406 JSTOR
- Gambill, Edward. Conservative Ordeal: Northern Democrats and Reconstruction, 1865–1868. (1981). Political history of Democratic Party unable to shed its Civil War label of treason and defeatism, even as it successfully blocked a few elements of Radical Reconstruction.
- Gillette, William. Retreat from Reconstruction, 1869–1879. Louisiana State University Press: 1979. Traces failure of Reconstruction to the power of Democrats, administrative inefficiencies, racism, and lack of commitment by northern Republicans.
- Harris, William C. With Charity for All: Lincoln and the Restoration of the Union (1997) portrays Lincoln as opponent of Radicals.
- McAfee, Ward. Religion, Race, and Reconstruction: The Public School in the Politics of the 1870s SUNY Press, 1998.
- McKitrick, Eric L. Andrew Johnson and Reconstruction (1961) portrays Johnson as weak politician unable to forge coalitions.
- McPherson, James M. The Abolitionist Legacy: From Reconstruction to the NAACP (1975) (ISBN 0-691-10039-X)
- Mantell, Martin E. Johnson, Grant and the Politics of Reconstruction. Columbia University Press. 1973.
- Nicolay, John and John Hay, "First Plans for Emancipation," Century (Dec 1888): pp 276–294; Online Authors were Lincoln's top aides in the White House
  - Nicolay, John and John Hay, "The Wade-Davis Manifesto" Century (July 1889): pp 414–421 online version
- Summers, Mark Wahlgren.The Press Gang: Newspapers and Politics, 1865–1878 (1994)

=== Constitutional issues ===
- Belz, Herman. Emancipation and Equal Rights: Politics and Constitutionalism in the Civil War Era (1978) pro-moderate.
- Belz, Herman. Abraham Lincoln, Constitutionalism, and Equal Rights in the Civil War Era, (1998) 268 pp.
- Foner, Eric (November 2012). "The Supreme Court and the history of reconstruction – and vice-versa". Columbia Law Review. 112 (7). Columbia Law School: 1585–1606. JSTOR 41708159. Archived from the original on 2015-11-17. Pdf.
- Foner, Eric. The Second Founding: How the Civil War and Reconstruction Remade the Constitution (2019)
- Guelzo, Allen C. "'The most awful problem that any nation ever undertook to solve': Reconstruction as a Crisis in Citizenship." Chapman Law Review 12.3 (Spring 2009) 705–720.
- Hyman, Harold M. A More Perfect Union (1975), constitutional history of Civil War & Reconstruction.
- Kaczorowski, Robert, The Politics of Judicial Interpretations: The Federal Courts, Department of Justice and Civil Rights, 1866–1876. Justice Department fight against KKK
- McLaughlin, Andrew. A Constitutional History of the United States (1935) Pulitzer Prize; ch 45–47 are on Reconstruction ISBN 978-1-931313-31-5
- Pildes, Richard H., "Democracy, Anti-Democracy, and the Canon", Constitutional Commentary, 17, (2000).
- Soifer, Aviam (November 2012). "Federal protection, paternalism, and the virtually forgotten prohibition of voluntary peonage". Columbia Law Review. 112 (7). Columbia Law School: 1607–1639. JSTOR 41708160. Archived from the original on 2015-11-17. Pdf.
- Zietlow, Rebecca E. (November 2012). "James Ashley's Thirteenth Amendment". Columbia Law Review. 112 (7). Columbia Law School: 1697–1731. JSTOR 41708162. Archived from the original on 2015-11-17. Pdf.

=== National politics: biographies ===
- Donald, David Herbert. Charles Sumner and the Rights of Man (1970), Pulitzer prize winning biography
- Frantz, Edward O. ed. A Companion to the Reconstruction Presidents 1865–1881 (2014) 30 essays by scholars excerpt and text search; emphasis on historiography
- Gienapp, William. Abraham Lincoln and Civil War America Oxford U. Press, (2002), short biography
- Hesseltine, William. Ulysses S. Grant: Politician. (1935).
- Hyman, Harold M. and Benjamin P. Thomas. Stanton: The Life and Times of Lincoln's Secretary of War. 1962.
- McFeely, William S. Grant: A Biography (1981); Pulitzer Prize.
- Simpson, Brooks D. The Reconstruction Presidents (2009), on Lincoln, Johnson and Grant
- Simpson, Brooks D. Let Us Have Peace: Ulysses S. Grant and the Politics of War and Reconstruction, 1861–1868 (1991).
- Stryker, Lloyd Paul; Andrew Johnson: A Study in Courage 1929. pro-Johnson Praeger, 2002. 444 pp.
- Olsen, Otto H. ed., Reconstruction and Redemption in the South (1980), state by state, neoabolitionist
- Perman, Michael. The Road to Redemption: Southern Politics, 1869–1879 University of North Carolina Press. 1984. detailed state-by-state narrative of Conservatives
- Rabinowitz, Howard N. editor. Southern Black Leaders of the Reconstruction Era (University of Illinois Press: 1982) ISBN 0-252-00929-0.
- Russ Jr., William A. "The Negro and White Disfranchisement During Radical Reconstruction" The Journal of Negro History Vol. 19, No. 2 (Apr., 1934), pp. 171–192 JSTOR
- Russ Jr., William A. "Registration and Disfranchisement Under Radical Reconstruction," The Mississippi Valley Historical Review Vol. 21, No. 2 (Sep., 1934), pp. 163–180 JSTOR
- Trelease, Allen W. White Terror: The Ku Klux Klan Conspiracy and Southern Reconstruction, (Louisiana State University Press: 1971, 1995). detailed treatment of the Klan, and similar groups.
- Wharton, V. L. "The Race Issue in the Overthrow of Reconstruction in Mississippi," Phylon (1940–1956) Vol. 2, No. 4 (4th Qtr., 1941), pp. 362–370 in JSTOR

=== Southern politics: biographies and leadership ===
- Bellani, Luna, Anselm Hager and Stephan Maurer. "The Long Shadow of Slavery: The Persistence of Slave Owners in Southern Lawmaking". Journal of Economic History, 82.1 (2022), pp. 250–283
- Dray, Philip. Capitol men: the epic story of Reconstruction through the lives of the first Black congressmen (2010).
- Foner, Eric. Freedom's Lawmakers: A Directory of Black Officeholders during Reconstruction (1993).
- Gatewood, Willard B. (2000). Aristocrats of color: the Black elite, 1880–1920. University of Arkansas Press. ISBN 978-1610750257.
- Hales, Douglas (2003). A southern family in white & Black: the Cuneys of Texas. Texas A&M University Press. ISBN 978-1585442003.
- Holt, Thomas. Black over white: Negro political leadership in South Carolina during Reconstruction (1979).
- Hume, Richard L. and Jerry B. Gough. Blacks, Carpetbaggers, and Scalawags: The Constitutional Conventions of Radical Reconstruction (LSU Press, 2008); statistical classification of delegates.
- Jenkins, Jeffery A., and Boris Heersink. "Republican Party Politics and the American South: From Reconstruction to Redemption, 1865–1880." (2016 paper the 2016 Annual Meeting of the Southern Political Science Association); online.
- Logan, Trevon D. "Do Black Politicians Matter? Evidence from Reconstruction". Journal of Economic History. 80.1 (2020), pp. 1–37
- Rabinowitz, Howard N., ed. Southern Black Leaders of the Reconstruction Era (1982), 422 pp.; 16 chapters by experts, on leaders and key groups
- Walters, Ronald W. and Robert C. Smith (1999). African American leadership. SUNY Press. ISBN 978-0791441459.

=== Social and economic history ===
- Ash, Stephen V. A Year in the South: Four Lives in 1865. Palgrave, 2002. 289 pp.
- Moore, A. B. "Railroad Building in Alabama During the Reconstruction Period" The Journal of Southern History, Vol. 1, No. 4. (Nov., 1935), pp. 421–441. JSTOR
- Morrow, Ralph E. "Northern Methodism in the South during Reconstruction." Mississippi Valley Historical Review, 41#2 (1954), pp. 197–218. in JSTOR
- Ransom, Roger L. and Sutch, Richard. One Kind of Freedom: The Economic Consequences of Emancipation. (2nd ed. 2001). 458 pp.
- Ruef, Martin, and Kelly Patterson, "Organizations and Local Development: Economic and Demographic Growth among Southern Counties during Reconstruction," Social Forces, 87 (June 2009), 1743–1771. statistical analysis
- Stover, John F. The Railroads of the South, 1865–1900: A Study in Finance and Control (1955)
- Summers, Mark Wahlgren. Railroads, Reconstruction, and the Gospel of Prosperity: Aid Under the Radical Republicans, 1865–1877 (1984)
- Tyack, David, and Robert Lowe. "The constitutional moment: Reconstruction and Black education in the South." American Journal of Education (1986): 236–256. in JSTOR
- Vaughn, William Preston. Schools for All: The Blacks and Public Education in the South, 1865–1877 (University Press of Kentucky, 2015).
- Williams, Heather Andrea. Self-Taught: African American Education in Slavery and Freedom (2006)
- Wilson, Kirt H. The Reconstruction Desegregation Debate: The Politics of Equality and the Rhetoric of Place, 1870–1875. (2002). 276 pp.

==== Women, family and gender ====
- Bond, Beverly G. "'Every Duty Incumbent Upon Them': African-American Women in Nineteenth Century Memphis." Tennessee Historical Quarterly 59.4 (2000): 254.
- Censer, Jane Turner. The Reconstruction of White Southern Womanhood, 1865–1895. (LSU Press, 2003). 316 pp.
- Clinton, Catherine. "Bloody terrain: Freedwomen, sexuality and violence during reconstruction." Georgia Historical Quarterly 76#2 (1992): 313–332. in JSTOR
- Edwards, Laura F. Gendered Strife and Confusion: The Political Culture of Reconstruction (1997).
- Farmer-Kaiser, Mary. Freedwomen and the Freedmen's Bureau: Race, Gender, and Public Policy in the Age of Emancipation (Fordham Univ Press, 2010). online review
- Frankel, Noralee. Freedom's women: Black women and families in Civil War era Mississippi (1999).
- Hunter, Tera W. To 'Joy My Freedom: Southern Black Women's Lives and Labors after the Civil War (Harvard University Press, 1997).
- Jones, Catherine A. Intimate Reconstructions: Children in Postemancipation Virginia (2015)
- Kennedy-Nolle, Sharon D. Writing Reconstruction: Race, Gender, and Citizenship in the Postwar South (U of North Carolina, 2015); historiography
- Oglesby, Catherine. "Gender and History of the Postbellum US South." History Compass 8.12 (2010): 1369–1379; historiography focused on white women.
- Olson, Lynne. Freedom's daughters: The unsung heroines of the civil rights movement from 1830 to 1970 (2001).
- Stout IV, Arthur Wendel. "White Manhood in Louisiana During Reconstruction, 1865–1877." (PhD Diss. Louisiana State University, 2015) online.
- Tsesis, Alexander (November 2012). "Gender discrimination and the Thirteenth Amendment". Columbia Law Review. 112 (7). Columbia Law School: 1641–1695. JSTOR 41708161. Archived from the original on 2014-11-28. Pdf.
- Whites, LeeAnn. Gender Matters: Civil War, Reconstruction, and the Making of the New South. (Palgrave, 2005). 244 pp.

=== Border states ===
- Coulter, E. Merton. The Civil War and Readjustment in Kentucky (U of North Carolina Press, 1926).
- Curry, Richard Orr, ed. Radicalism, Racism, and Party Realignment: The Border States during Reconstruction. (Johns Hopkins University Press, 1969). essays by scholars on each state.
- Hoskins, Patricia. "'The Old First is With the South:' The Civil War, Reconstruction, and Memory in the Jackson Purchase Region of Kentucky." (PhD dissertation, Auburn U. 2009). online Bibliography on pp 296–315.
- Howard, Victor B. Black Liberation in Kentucky: Emancipation and Freedom, 1862–1884. (U Press of Kentucky, 1983).
- Lewis, Patrick A. "The Democratic partisan militia and The Black Peril: the Kentucky militia, racial violence, and the fifteenth amendment, 1870–1873." Civil War History 56.2 (2010): 145–174. online
- McKinney, Gordon. Southern Mountain Republicans, 1865–1900 (U of North Carolina Press, 1978).
- Maslowski, Peter (1978). Treason Must Be Made Odious: Military Occupation and Wartime Reconstruction in Nashville, Tennessee, 1862–65. Millwood, N.Y: KTO Press. ISBN 978-0-527-62185-8. LCCN 78016799. OCLC 4004346.
- Marshall, Suzanne. Violence in the Black Patch of Kentucky and Tennessee (U of Missouri Press, 1994).
- Tapp, Hambleton and James C. Klotter. Kentucky: Decades of Discord, 1865–1900 (Kentucky Historical Society, 1977).
- Webb, Ross. Kentucky in the Reconstruction Era (University Press of Kentucky, 1979).

=== South: regional, state and local studies ===
- Abbott, Richard H. For Free Press and Equal Rights: Republican Newspapers in the Reconstruction South U of Georgia Press, 2004. 266 pp. online review
- Baggett, James Alex. The Scalawags: Southern Dissenters in the Civil War and Reconstruction. (LSU Press, 2003). 323 pp.
- Behrend, Justin. Reconstructing Democracy: Grassroots Black Politics in the Deep South after the Civil War (University of Georgia Press, 2015), 355 pp.
- Bradley, Mark. Bluecoats and Tar Heels: Soldiers and Civilians in Reconstruction North Carolina (University Press of Kentucky, 2009)
- Brown, Canter Jr. Florida's Black Public Officials, 1867–1924
- Coulter, E. Merton. The Civil War and Readjustment in Kentucky (1926)
- Coulter, E. Merton. The South During Reconstruction, 1865–1877 (1947). Dunning School. region-wide history
- Davis, William Watson. The Civil War and Reconstruction in Florida (Columbia University, 1913), Dunning School online
- Donald, David H. "The Scalawag in Mississippi Reconstruction," The Journal of Southern History Vol. 10, No. 4 (Nov., 1944), pp. 447–460 JSTOR
- Fields, Barbara Jean, Slavery and Freedom on the Middle Ground: Maryland (1985)
- Fitzgerald, Michael W. Urban Emancipation: Popular Politics in Reconstruction Mobile, 1860–1890. (LSU Press, 2002. 301 pp.
- Foner, Eric. Freedom's Lawmakers: A Directory of Black Officeholders During Reconstruction (Revised edition, LSU Press, 1996) biographies of more than 1,500 officeholders.
- Garner, James Wilford. Reconstruction in Mississippi (1901), Dunning School
- Hahn, Steven. A Nation under Our Feet: Black Political Struggles in the Rural South from Slavery to the Great Migration (2003)
- Hamilton, Peter Joseph. The Reconstruction Period (1906), full length history of era; Dunning School approach; 570 pp; chapters on each state
- Harris, William C. The Day of the Carpetbagger: Republican Reconstruction in Mississippi (1979)
- Hume, Richard L. and Jerry B. Gough. Blacks, Carpetbaggers, and Scalawags: The Constitutional Conventions of Radical Reconstruction (LSU Press, 2008); statistical classification of delegates.
- Jenkins, Jeffery A., and Boris Heersink. "Republican Party Politics and the American South: From Reconstruction to Redemption, 1865–1880." (2016 paper at the 2016 Annual Meeting of the Southern Political Science Association); online.
- Middleton, Stephen, ed. Black Congressmen during Reconstruction: A Documentary Sourcebook. Praeger, 2002. 444 pp.
- Olsen, Otto H. ed., Reconstruction and Redemption in the South (1980), state by state, neoabolitionist
- Perman, Michael. The Road to Redemption: Southern Politics, 1869–1879 University of North Carolina Press. 1984. detailed state-by-state narrative of Conservatives
- Rabinowitz, Howard N. editor. Southern Black Leaders of the Reconstruction Era (University of Illinois Press: 1982) ISBN 0-252-00929-0.
- Russ Jr., William A. "The Negro and White Disfranchisement During Radical Reconstruction" The Journal of Negro History Vol. 19, No. 2 (Apr., 1934), pp. 171–192 JSTOR
- Russ Jr., William A. "Registration and Disfranchisement Under Radical Reconstruction," The Mississippi Valley Historical Review Vol. 21, No. 2 (Sep., 1934), pp. 163–180 in JSTOR
- Trelease, Allen W. White Terror: The Ku Klux Klan Conspiracy and Southern Reconstruction, (LSU Press: 1971, 1995). detailed treatment of the Klan, and similar groups.
- Wharton, V. L. "The Race Issue in the Overthrow of Reconstruction in Mississippi," Phylon (1940–1956) 2#4 (1941), pp. 362–370 in JSTOR

==== Alabama ====
- Bethel, Elizabeth . "The Freedmen's Bureau in Alabama," Journal of Southern History Vol. 14, No. 1, Feb., 1948 pp. 49–92 online at JSTOR
- Bond, Horace Mann. "Social and Economic Forces in Alabama Reconstruction," Journal of Negro History 23 (1938): 290–348 in JSTOR
- Fitzgerald, Michael R. Urban Emancipation: Popular Politics in Reconstruction Mobile, 1860–1890. (2002). 301 pp. ISBN 0-8071-2837-6.
- Fitzgerald, Michael R. "Radical Republicanism and the White Yeomanry During Alabama Reconstruction, 1865–1868." Journal of Southern History 54 (November 1988): 565–596. JSTOR
- Fleming, Walter L. Civil War and Reconstruction in Alabama (1905). the most detailed study; Dunning School full text online from Project Gutenberg
- Kolchin, Peter. First Freedom: The Responses of Alabama's Blacks to Emancipation and Reconstruction. (Greenwood Press: 1972) Explores black migration, labor, and social structure in the first five years of Reconstruction.
- Moore, A. B. "Railroad Building in Alabama During the Reconstruction Period" The Journal of Southern History, Vol. 1, No. 4. (Nov., 1935), pp. 421–441. JSTOR
- Rogers, William Warren. The One-Gallused Rebellion; Agrarianism in Alabama, 1865–1896 (1970).
- Storey, Margaret M. Loyalty and Loss: Alabama's Unionists in the Civil War and Reconstruction. Louisiana State U. Press, 2004. 296 pp.
- Wiener, Jonathan M. Social Origins of the New South; Alabama, 1860–1885. (1978) new social history
- Wiggins, Sarah Woolfolk. The Scalawag in Alabama Politics, 1865–1881 (1991)
- Wiggins, Sarah Woolfolk. "Alabama: Democratic Bulldozing and Republican Folly." in Reconstruction and Redemption in the South, edited by Otto H. Olson. (1980).

==== Arkansas ====
- Atkinson, James H. "The Brooks-Baxter Contest." Arkansas Historical Quarterly 4.2 (1945): 124–149. in JSTOR
- DeBlack, Thomas A. "'A Harnessed Revolution': Reconstruction in Arkansas." in Arkansas: A Narrative History, eds. Jeannie M. Whayne, Thomas A. DeBlack, George Sabo III, and Morris S. Arnold, (University of Arkansas Press, 2002) pp. 219–227.
- DeBlack, Thomas A. With Fire and Sword: Arkansas, 1861–1874. U. of Arkansas Pr., 2003. 307 pp.
- Dillard, Tom. "To the Back of the Elephant: Racial Conflict in the Arkansas Republican Party." Arkansas Historical Quarterly 33.1 (1974): 3–15. in JSTOR
- Donovan, Timothy Paul, Willard B. Gatewood, and Jeannie M. Whayne, eds. The Governors of Arkansas: Essays in Political Biography (U of Arkansas Press, 1995).
- Hume, Richard L. "The Arkansas Constitutional Convention of 1868: A Case Study in the Politics of Reconstruction." Journal of Southern History 39.2 (1973): 183–206. in JSTOR
- Ledbetter, Cal. "The Constitution of 1868: Conqueror's Constitution or Constitutional Continuity?." Arkansas Historical Quarterly 44.1 (1985): 16–41. in JSTOR
- Moneyhon, Carl H. The Impact of the Civil War and Reconstruction on Arkansas: Persistence in the Midst of Ruin (U of Arkansas Press, 2002).
- Neal, Diane, and Thomas W. Kremm. The Lion of the South: General Thomas C. Hindman (Mercer University Press, 1997).
- Richter, William L. "'A Dear Little Job': Second Lieutenant Hiram F. Willis, Freedmen's Bureau Agent in Southwestern Arkansas, 1866–1868." Arkansas Historical Quarterly 50.2 (1991): 158–200. in JSTOR
- Staples, Thomas Starling. Reconstruction in Arkansas, 1862–1874. (Columbia UP, 1923).
- Wintory, Blake. "William Hines Furbush: African-American Carpetbagger, Republican, Fusionist, and Democrat." Arkansas Historical Quarterly 63.2 (2004): 107–165. in JSTOR
- Wintory, Blake J. "African-American Legislators in the Arkansas General Assembly, 1868–1893." Arkansas Historical Quarterly 65.4 (2006): 385–434. in JSTOR
- Woodward, Earl F. "The Brooks and Baxter War in Arkansas, 1872–1874." Arkansas Historical Quarterly 30.4 (1971): 315–336. in JSTOR

==== Georgia ====
- Abbott, Richard H. "The Republican Party Press in Reconstruction Georgia, 1867–1874." Journal of Southern History 61.4 (1995): 725–760. in JSTOR
- Bryant, Jonathan M. How Curious a Land: Conflict and Change in Greene County, Georgia, 1850–1885 (University of North Carolina Press, 1996).
- Cimbala, Paul A. Under the Guardianship of the Nation: The Freedmen's Bureau and the Reconstruction of Georgia, 1865–1870 (2003)
- Conway, Alan. The Reconstruction of Georgia (University of Minnesota Press, 1967).
- Drago, Edmund L. Black Politicians and Reconstruction in Georgia: A Splendid Failure (1992)
- Nathans, Elizabeth Studley. Losing the Peace: Georgia Republicans and Reconstruction, 1865–1871 (LSU Press, 1969)
- Sims-Alvarado, Falechiondro Karcheik. "The African-American Emigration Movement in Georgia during Reconstruction." (Dissertation, Georgia State University, 2011). online
- Thompson, C. Mildred. Reconstruction In Georgia: Economic, Social, Political 1865–1872 (1915; 2010 reprint) excerpt and text search; full text online free
- Wetherington, Mark V. Plain Folk's Fight: The Civil War and Reconstruction in Piney Woods Georgia (2005).
- Wynne, Lewis Nicholas. The continuity of cotton: planter politics in Georgia, 1865–1892 (Mercer University Press, 1986).

==== Louisiana ====
- Arnesen, Eric. Waterfront Workers of New Orleans: race, class, and politics, 1863–1923. (Oxford UP, 1991).
- Blassingame, John W. Black New Orleans 1860–1880 (U of Chicago Press, 1973).
- Capers, Gerald M. Occupied City, New Orleans Under the Federals 1862–1865. (U of Kentucky Press, 1965).
- Fischer, Roger. The Segregation Struggle in Louisiana, 1862–1877. (University of Illinois Press: 1974) Study of free persons of color in New Orleans who provided leadership in the unsuccessful fight against segregation of schools and public accommodations.
- Hogue, James Keith. Uncivil War: Five New Orleans Street Battles and the Rise and Fall of Radical Reconstruction (LSU Press, 2006)
- Hollandsworth Jr, James G. The Louisiana Native Guards: The Black Military Experience During the Civil War (LSU Press, 1995).
- Hollandsworth, James G. An Absolute Massacre: The New Orleans Race Riot of July 30, 1866 (LSU Press, 2001).
- Long, Alecia P. The Great Southern Babylon: Sex, Race, and Respectability in New Orleans, 1865–1920 (LSU Press, 2005).
- McCrary, Peyton. Abraham Lincoln and Reconstruction: The Louisiana Experiment (1978).
- Rabinowitz, Howard N. Race Relations in the Urban South 1865–1890 (Oxford UP, 1978).
- Rousey, Dennis Charles. Policing the Southern City: New Orleans 1805–1889 (LSU Press, 1996).
- Stout IV, Arthur Wendel. "A Return to Civilian Leadership: New Orleans, 1865–1866" (MA thesis, LSU, 2007). online bibliography pp 58–62.
- Taylor, Joe Gray. Louisiana Reconstructed, 1863–1877 (LSU Press, 1974).
- Wetta, Frank J. The Louisiana Scalawags: Politics, Race, and Terrorism During the Civil War and Reconstruction (LSU Press; 2012) 256 pages
- White, Howard A. The Freedmen's Bureau in Louisiana (LSU Press, 1970).

==== South Carolina ====
- Cisco, Walter Brian. Wade Hampton: Confederate warrior, conservative statesman (Potomac Books, 2004) on South Carolina politics
- Holt, Thomas. Black over White: Negro Political Leadership in South Carolina During Reconstruction. (University of Illinois Press: 1977). Black elected officials, their divisions, and battles with white governors who controlled patronage and their ultimate failure.
- King, Ronald F. "Counting the votes: South Carolina's stolen election of 1876." Journal of Interdisciplinary History 32.2 (2001): 169–191. statistical
- Reynolds, John S. Reconstruction in South Carolina, 1865–1877, Negro Universities Press, 1969
- Rose, Willie Lee . Rehearsal for Reconstruction: The Port Royal Experiment (1967) Blacks given land in 1863 in coastal South Carolina
- Rubin, Hyman III. South Carolina Scalawags (2006)
- Kantrowitz, Stephen David. Ben Tillman & the Reconstruction of White Supremacy (University of North Carolina Press, 2000), on South Carolina politics after 1877
- Simkins, Francis Butler, and Robert Hilliard Woody. South Carolina during Reconstruction (1932), revisionist (Beardian) school; comprehensive coverage
- Taylor, Alrutheus, Negro in South Carolina During the Reconstruction (AMS Press: 1924) ISBN 0-404-00216-1
- Taylor, A. A. "The Negro in South Carolina During the Reconstruction" The Journal of Negro History, Vol. 9–11 (1924–1926) (multi-part article) JSTOR full text
- Williamson, Joel. After Slavery: The Negro in South Carolina during Reconstruction, 1861–1877 1965.
- Woody, R. H. "The Labor and Immigration Problem of South Carolina during Reconstruction" The Mississippi Valley Historical Review 18#2 (1931), pp. 195–212 JSTOR
- Zuczek, Richard. State of Rebellion: Reconstruction in South Carolina (U of South Carolina Press, 1996)

==== Tennessee ====
- Alexander, Thomas B. Political Reconstruction in Tennessee (1950)
  - Alexander, Thomas B. "Political Reconstruction in Tennessee, 1865–1870,'" in Richard O. Curry, ed., Radicalism, Racism, and Party Realignment: The Border States during Reconstruction (Johns Hopkins UP, 1969) pp 37–79; an abridged version of Alexander's 1950 book.
- Alexander, Thomas B. "Kukluxism in Tennessee, 1865–1869." Tennessee Historical Quarterly (1949): 195–219. in JSTOR
- Binning, F. Wayne. "The Tennessee Republicans in Decline, 1869–1876: Part I." Tennessee Historical Quarterly 39.4 (1980): 471–484. in JSTOR
- Cimprich, John. Slavery's End in Tennessee (U of Alabama Press, 2002).
- Cimprich, John. "The Beginning of the Black Suffrage Movement in Tennessee, 1864–65." Journal of Negro History 65.3 (1980): 185–195. in JSTOR
- Coulter, E. Merton. William G. Brownlow: Fighting Parson of the Southern Highlands (1937) online
- Fisher, Noel C. War at Every Door: Partisan Politics and Guerrilla Violence in East Tennessee, 1860–1869 (U of North Carolina Press, 2001).
- Fraser Jr., Walter J. "Black Reconstructionists in Tennessee." Tennessee Historical Quarterly 34 (1975): 362–382.
- Groce, W. Todd. Mountain Rebels: East Tennessee Confederates and the Civil War, 1860–1870 (U of Tennessee Press, 2000).
- Harcourt, Edward John. "Who were the pale faces? New perspectives on the Tennessee Ku Klux." Civil War History 51.1 (2005): 23–66. online
- Harcourt, Edward John. "The Whipping of Richard Moore: Reading Emotion in Reconstruction America," Journal of Social History 36.2 (2002): 261–282.
- Hardaway, Roger D. “Race, Sex, and Law: Miscegenation in Tennessee.” Journal of East Tennessee History 74 (2002): 24–37.
- Hardy, William E. “The Margins of William Brownlow’s Words: New Perspectives on the End of Radical Reconstruction in Tennessee.” Journal of East Tennessee History 84 (2012) 78–86.
- Hardy, William Edward. "'Fare well to all Radicals': Redeeming Tennessee, 1869–1870." (PhD dissertation, U of Tennessee, 2013). online Bibliography on pp 249–75.
- Hooper, Ernest Walter. Memphis, Tennessee, Federal occupation and reconstruction, 1862–1870. (U of North Carolina, 1957).
- Jones, Robert B. “The Press in the Election: Ending Tennessee’s Reconstruction.” Tennessee Historical Quarterly 65 (2006): 320–341.
- Jordan, Weymouth T. “The Freedmen’s Bureau in Tennessee.” East Tennessee Historical Society’s Publications 11 (1939): 47–61.
- LeForge, Judy Bussell. “State Colored Convention of Tennessee, 1865–1866.” Tennessee Historical Quarterly 65 (2006): 230–253.
- McKinney, Gordon B. Southern Mountain Republicans, 1865–1900: Politics and the Appalachian Community (U of Tennessee Press, 1998).
- Maslowski, Peter. Treason must be made odious: military occupation and wartime reconstruction in Nashville, Tennessee, 1862–65. (Kto Press, 1978).
- Maslowski, Peter. "From Reconciliation to Reconstruction: Lincoln, Johnson, and Tennessee, Part II." Tennessee Historical Quarterly 42.4 (1983): 343–361. in JSTOR
- Miscamble, Wilson D. "Andrew Johnson and the Election of William G. ('Parson') Brownlow as Governor of Tennessee." Tennessee Historical Quarterly 37.3 (1978): 308–320. in JSTOR
- Parker, James C. “Tennessee Gubernatorial Elections: 1869 – The Victory of the Conservatives.” Tennessee Historical Quarterly 33 (1974): 34–48.
- Patton; James Welch. Unionism and Reconstruction in Tennessee, 1860–1869 (1934)
- Phillips, Paul David. “Education of Blacks in Tennessee During Reconstruction, 1865–1870.” Tennessee Historical Quarterly 46 (1987): 98–109.
- Phillips, Paul David. "White Reaction to the Freedmen's Bureau in Tennessee." Tennessee Historical Quarterly 25.1 (1966): 50–62. in JSTOR
- Queener, Verton M. “A Decade of East Tennessee Republicanism, 1867–1876.” East Tennessee Historical Society’s Publications 14 (1942): 59–84.
- Taylor, Alrutheus A. Negro in Tennessee 1865–1880 (1974) ISBN 0-87152-165-2

==== Texas ====
- Barr, Alwyn. Reconstruction to Reform: Texas Politics, 1876–1906 (1971)
- Bellani, Luna, Anselm Hager and Stephan Maurer. "The Long Shadow of Slavery: The Persistence of Slave Owners in Southern Lawmaking". Journal of Economic History, 82.1 (2022), pp. 250–283
- Buenger, Walter L. The Path to a Modern South: Northeast Texas between Reconstruction and the Great Depression (2001)
- Campbell, Randolph B. Grass-Roots Reconstruction in Texas, 1865–1880 (1997).
- Crouch, Barry A. "'Unmanacling' Texas Reconstruction: A Twenty-Year Perspective," Southwestern Historical Quarterly 1990 93(3): 275–302
- Crouch, Barry A. The Freedmen's Bureau and Black Texans. (1992).
- Crouch; Barry A. "The 'Chords of Love': Legalizing Black Marital and Family Rights in Postwar Texas" The Journal of Negro History, Vol. 79, 1994
- Gould, Lewis N. Progressives and Prohibitionists: Texas Democrats in the Wilson Era (1973).
- Howell, Kenneth W., ed. Still the Arena of Civil War: Violence and Turmoil in Reconstruction Texas, 1865–1874 (University of North Texas Press, 2012) 445 pp. scholarly essays
- McArthur, Judith N. Creating the New Woman: The Rise of Southern Women's Progressive Culture in Texas, 1893–1918. (1998).
- Moneyhon, Carl H. "The Civil War and Reconstruction (1861–1874)" in Bruce A. Glasrud and Cary D. Wintz, eds. Discovering Texas History (University of Oklahoma Press, 2014) pp 210–242; historiography.
- Moneyhon, Carl H. Edmund J. Davis of Texas: Civil War General, Republican Leader, Reconstruction Governor (Texas Christian University Press, 2010) 337 pp. ISBN 978-0-87565-405-8
- Moneyhon, Carl H. Texas after the Civil War: The Struggle of Reconstruction. Texas A. & M. U. Press, 2004. 237 pp.
- Pitre, Merline. "The Evolution of Black Political Participation in Reconstruction Texas." East Texas Historical Journal 26.1 (1988): 8+. online
  - Pitre, Merline. Through Many Dangers, Toils, and Snares: The Black Leadership of Texas, 1868–1900 Eakin Press, 1985.
- Ramsdell, Charles William. Reconstruction in Texas (1910). full text online Dunning school
- Ramsdell, Charles W., "Presidential Reconstruction in Texas ", Southwestern Historical Quarterly, (1907) v.11#4 277–317.
- Rice, Lawrence D. The Negro in Texas, 1874–1900 (1971)
- Richter, William L. Overreached on All Sides: The Freedmen's Bureau Administrators in Texas, 1865–1868 1991.
- Smallwood, James M.; Crouch, Barry A.; and Peacock, Larry. Murder and Mayhem: The War of Reconstruction in Texas. Texas A. & M. U. Press, 2003. 182 pp.
- Sneed, Edgar P. "A Historiography of Reconstruction in Texas: Some Myths and Problems," Southwestern Historical Quarterly 1969 72(4): 435–448
- Work, David, "United States Colored Troops in Texas during Reconstruction, 1865–1867," Southwestern Historical Quarterly, 109 (Jan. 2006), 337–357.
- Freedmen's Bureau in Texas

==== Virginia ====
- Dailey, Jane. "Deference and violence in the postbellum urban South: manners and massacres in Danville, Virginia." Journal of Southern History 63.3 (1997): 553–590. in JSTOR
- Eckenrode, Hamilton James. The Political History of Virginia During the Reconstruction (Johns Hopkins Press, 1904); online
- Hume, Richard L. "The Membership of the Virginia Constitutional Convention of 1867–1868: A Study of the Beginnings of Congressional Reconstruction in the Upper South." Virginia Magazine of History and Biography 86.4 (1978): 461–484. in JSTOR
- Jones, Catherine A. Intimate Reconstructions: Children in Postemancipation Virginia (2015).
- Jones, Robert R. "James L. Kemper and the Virginia Redeemers Face the Race Question: A Reconsideration." Journal of Southern History 38.3 (1972): 393–414. in JSTOR
- Lowe, Richard. "Another Look at Reconstruction in Virginia." Civil War History 32.1 (1986): 56–76. online; historiography.
- Lowe, Richard G. Republicans and Reconstruction in Virginia, 1856–70 (U Press of Virginia, 1991).
- Maddex, Jack P. The Virginia conservatives, 1867–1879: a study in Reconstruction politics (U of North Carolina Press, 1970).
- Moore, Louis. "The elusive center: Virginia politics and the general assembly, 1869–1871." Virginia Magazine of History and Biography (1995): 207–236. in JSTOR
- Morsman, Amy Feely. The Big House After Slavery: Virginia Plantation Families and their Postbellum Domestic Experiment (2010).
- Mugleston, William F., and Marcus Sterling Hopkins. "The Freedmen's Bureau and Reconstruction in Virginia: The Diary of Marcus Sterling Hopkins, a Union Officer." Virginia Magazine of History and Biography (1978): 45–102. in JSTOR, primary sources
- Naragon, Michael. "From chattel to citizen: The transition from slavery to freedom in Richmond, Virginia." Slavery and Abolition 21.2 (2000): 93–116.
- Taylor, Alrutheus, The Negro in the Reconstruction Of Virginia (The Association for the Study of Negro Life and History: 1926)
- Thomas, Jerry B. "Jedediah Hotchkiss, gilded-age propagandist of industrialism." Virginia Magazine of History and Biography 84.2 (1976): 189–202. in JSTOR

=== Compromise of 1877 and end of Reconstruction ===
- Benedict, Michael L. "Southern Democrats in the Crisis of 1876–1877: A Reconsideration of Reunion and Reaction". Journal of Southern History 46 (November 1980): 489–524; Says the Compromise was reached before the Wormley hotel meetings discussed by Woodward (1951); in JSTOR
- DeSantis, Vincent P. "Rutherford B. Hayes and the Removal of the Troops and the End of Reconstruction". In Region, Race and Reconstruction Ed. by Morgan Kousser and James McPherson. (1982). 417–450. Provides a more complex account of Hayes's decision.
- De Santis, Vincent P. "President Hayes's Southern Policy." Journal of Southern History 1955 21(4): 476–494. in Jstor
- Hoogenboom, Ari. The Presidency of Rutherford B. Hayes (1988)
- King, Ronald F. "A Most Corrupt Election: Louisiana in 1876." Studies in American Political Development 2001 15(2): 123–137. ISSN 0898-588X Fulltext: online from Cambridge Journals
- Peskin, Allan. "Was There a Compromise of 1877?" Journal of American History (1973) v 60#1, pp 63–75 in JSTOR; Admits that Woodward's interpretation is almost universally accepted but since not all terms were met it should not be called a compromise.
- McPherson, James M. "Coercion or Conciliation? Abolitionists Debate President Hayes's Southern Policy." New England Quarterly 1966 39(4): 474–497. in JSTOR; Argues Hayes had been convinced since 1875 that Grant's approach toward the South had to be abandoned and hoped to substitute conciliation for coercion, believing that the good will of Southern upper class whites would provide better protection for Blacks than the hated Federal troops. A majority of abolitionists disagreed, but about 36% of abolitionists supported Hayes, thereby causing a decided division in their ranks.
- Polakoff, Keith Ian. The Politics of Inertia: The Election of 1876 and the End of Reconstruction. Louisiana State University Press, 1973. Argues the Compromise reflected decentralized parties and weak national leaders
- Simpson, Brooks D. "Ulysses S. Grant and the Electoral Crisis of 1876–1877." Hayes Historical Journal 1992 11(2): 5–22. ISSN 0364-5924. The compromise kept the White House in GOP control. It ended the promise of Reconstruction, as many scholars have argued, and more importantly it maintained the still fragile Union. Historians mostly ignored Grant's decisive role in engineering the compromise. He was not a lame duck but took a deep interest in the behind-the-scenes negotiations. His apparent inaction stemmed from the very real threat of violence that could once again divide the nation, and ultimately his quiet diplomacy was key to the final peaceful outcome. Online text.
- Vazzano, Frank P. "President Hayes, Congress and the Appropriations Riders Vetoes." Congress & the Presidency 1993 20(1): 25–37. ISSN 0734-3469 Fulltext: at Ebsco. Shows Hayes vetoed Democratic bills intended to remove the last remaining Reconstruction-era restraints: federal marshals at Southern polling places and loyalty oaths for jurors.
- Woodward, C. Vann. Reunion and Reaction: The Compromise of 1877 and the End of Reconstruction (1951), emphasizes the role of railroads.
- Woodward, C. Vann. "Yes, There Was a Compromise of 1877" Journal of American History (1973) v 60#2, pp 215–223. in JSTOR. Rebuts Peskin; the main terms were indeed met.

=== Historiography and memory ===
- Bilbija, Marina. "Democracy's New Song: Black Reconstruction in America, 1860–1880 and the Melodramatic Imagination," Annals of the American Academy of Political & Social Science (2011) 637#1 pp 64–77; on DuBois, Black Reconstruction
- Beale, Howard K. "On Rewriting Reconstruction History." American Historical Review (1940) 45#4 pp: 807–827. in JSTOR
- Briley, Ron. "Hollywood's Reconstruction and the Persistence of Historical Mythmaking," History Teacher (2008) 41#4 pp 453–468. in JSTOR
- Brown, Thomas J., ed. Reconstructions: New Perspectives on the Postbellum United States (2007), essays by scholars
  - Giggie, John M. "Rethinking Reconstruction," Reviews in American History (2007) 35#4 pp 545–555. in Project MUSE
- Cimbala, Paul A. "Essay Review: Carpetbaggers, Freedmen, and the Unfinished Revolution: Reconstruction and the American Mind," Pennsylvania Magazine of History and Biography (1989) 113#2 pp. 265–275 in JSTOR
- Davis, Robert Scott, "New Ideas from New Sources: Modern Research in Reconstruction, 1865–1876," Georgia Historical Quarterly, 93 (Fall 2009), 291–306.
- Ebner, David, and Larry Langman, eds. Hollywood's Image of the South: A Century of Southern Films Greenwood Press. 2001. Ch 9–10 on Reconstruction and KKK.
- Foner, Eric. "Reconstruction Revisited," Reviews in American History (1982) 10#1 pp 82–100 in JSTOR
- Franklin, John Hope. "Whither Reconstruction Historiography," Journal of Negro Education (1948) 17: 446–481 in JSTOR
- Frantz, Edward O. ed. A Companion to the Reconstruction Presidents 1865–1881 (Wiley Blackwell Companions to American History) (2014), emphasis on historiography
- Sneed, Edgar P. "A Historiography of Reconstruction in Texas: Some Myths and Problems," Southwestern Historical Quarterly (1969) 72#4 pp. 435–448 in JSTOR
- Thomas, Brook. Literature of Reconstruction: Not in Plain Black and White (2016) looks at writers such as W. E. B. Du Bois, Thomas Dixon, and Charles W. Chesnutt, Albion W. Tourgée, María Amparo Ruiz de Burton, and Constance Fenimore Woolson.
- Weisberger, Bernard A. "The Dark Ground of Reconstruction Historiography," Journal of Southern History (1959) 25#4 427–447. in JSTOR

== Primary sources ==
- Barnes, William H., ed. History of the Thirty-ninth Congress of the United States. (1868) useful summary of Congressional activity.
- Berlin, Ira; Fields, Barbara J.; Miller, Steven F.; Reidy, Joseph P., and Rowland, Leslie S., eds. Free at Last: A Documentary History of Slavery, Freedom, and the Civil War (1995)
- Blaine, James.Twenty Years of Congress: From Lincoln to Garfield. With a review of the events which led to the political revolution of 1860 (1886). By Republican Congressional leader
- Fleming, Walter L. Documentary History of Reconstruction: Political, Military, Social, Religious, Educational, and Industrial 2 vol (1906). Uses broad collection of primary sources; vol 1 on national politics; vol 2 on states; volume 1 493 pp online and vol 2 480 pp online
- Memoirs of W. W. Holden (1911), North Carolina Scalawag governor
- Hahn, Steven; Miller, Steven F.; O'Donovan, Susan E.; Rodrigue, John C., and Rowland, Leslies S., eds. Land and Labor, 1865 (Chapel Hill, N.C., 2008). Series 3, volume 1 of Freedom: A Documentary History of Emancipation, 1861–1867.
- Documents from Freedom: A Documentary History of Emancipation, 1861–1867.
- Hyman, Harold M., ed. The Radical Republicans and Reconstruction, 1861–1870. (1967), collection of long political speeches and pamphlets.
- Lynch, John R. The Facts of Reconstruction. (New York: 1913)Full text online One of first black congressmen during Reconstruction.
- Edward McPherson, The Political History of the United States of America During the Period of Reconstruction (1875), large collection of speeches and primary documents, 1865–1870, complete text online. [The copyright has expired.]
- Palmer, Beverly Wilson and Holly Byers Ochoa, eds. The Selected Papers of Thaddeus Stevens 2 vol (1998), 900 pp; his speeches plus and letters to and from Stevens
- Palmer, Beverly Wilson, ed/ The Selected Letters of Charles Sumner 2 vol (1990); vol 2 covers 1859–1874
- Pike, James Shepherd (1874). The prostrate state: South Carolina under negro government.
- Reid, Whitelaw. After the war: a southern tour, May 1, 1865 to May 1, 1866. (1866) by Republican editor
- Charles Sumner, "Our Domestic Relations: or, How to Treat the Rebel States" Atlantic Monthly September 1863, early Radical manifesto

=== Newspapers and magazines ===
- DeBow's Review major Southern conservative magazine; stress on business, economics and statistics
- Harper's Weekly leading New York news magazine; pro-Radical
- Nast, Thomas. magazine cartoons pro-Radical editorial cartoons
- Primary sources from Gilder-Lehrman collection
- The New York Times daily edition online through ProQuest at academic libraries

=== Freedman's Bureau ===
- Bentley George R. A History of the Freedmen's Bureau (1955)
- Carpenter, John A.; Sword and Olive Branch: Oliver Otis Howard (1999) full biography of Bureau leader
- Cimbala, Paul A. The Freedmen's Bureau: Reconstructing the American South after the Civil War. Krieger, 2005. 220 pp., short survey
- Cimbala, Paul A. and Trefousse, Hans L. (eds.) The Freedmen's Bureau: Reconstructing the American South After the Civil War. 2005. essays by scholars
- W. E. Burghardt Du Bois, "The Freedmen's Bureau" (1901)
- Foner Eric. Reconstruction: America's Unfinished Revolution, 1863–1877 (1988) general history
- Litwack, Leon F. Been in the Storm So Long: The Aftermath of Slavery. 1979. .
- McFeely, William S. Yankee Stepfather: General O.O. Howard and the Freedmen. 1994.

==== Education ====
- Anderson, James D. The Education of Blacks in the South, 1860–1935 (1988)
- Blum, Edward J. Reforging the White Republic: Race, Religion, and American Nationalism, 1865–1898 (2005)
- Butchart, Ronald E. Northern Schools, Southern Blacks, and Reconstruction: Freedmen's Education, 1862–1875 (1980)
- Crouch, Barry A. "Black Education in Civil War and Reconstruction Louisiana: George T. Ruby, the Army, and the Freedmen's Bureau" Louisiana History 1997 38(3): 287–308. ISSN 0024-6816
- Goldhaber, Michael. "A Mission Unfulfilled: Freedmen's Education in North Carolina, 1865–1870" Journal of Negro History 1992 77(4): 199–210. ISSN 0022-2992
- Jones, Jacqueline. Soldiers of Light and Love: Northern Teachers and Georgia Blacks, 1865–1873 U of North Carolina Press 1980
- Morris, Robert C. Reading, 'Riting, and Reconstruction: The Education of Freedmen in the South, 1861–1870 1981.
- Richardson, Joe M. Christian Reconstruction: The American Missionary Association and Southern Blacks, 1861–1890 U of Georgia Press, 1986
- Span, Christopher M. "'I Must Learn Now or Not at All': Social and Cultural Capital in the Educational Initiatives of Formerly Enslaved African Americans in Mississippi, 1862–1869," The Journal of African American History, 2002 pp 196–222
- Swint, Henry Lee. The Northern Teacher in the South: 1862–1870 (New York, 1967).
- Williams, Heather Andrea; "'Clothing Themselves in Intelligence': The Freedpeople, Schooling, and Northern Teachers, 1861–1871" The Journal of African American History 2002. pp 372+.
- Williams, Heather Andrea. Self-Taught: African American Education in Slavery and Freedom U of North Carolina Press, 2006

==== Freedmen's Bureau ====
- Cimbala, Paul A. "On the Front Line of Freedom: Freedmen's Bureau Officers and Agents in Reconstruction Georgia, 1865–1868". Georgia Historical Quarterly 1992 76(3): 577–611. ISSN 0016-8297.
- Cimbala, Paul A. Under the Guardianship of the Nation: the Freedmen's Bureau and the Reconstruction of Georgia, 1865–1870 U. of Georgia Press, 1997.
- Click, Patricia C. Time Full of Trial: The Roanoke Island Freedmen's Colony, 1862–1867 (2001)
- Crouch, Barry. The Freedmen's Bureau and Black Texans (1992)
- Durrill, Wayne K. "Political Legitimacy and Local Courts: 'Politicks at Such a Rage' in a Southern Community during Reconstruction" in Journal of Southern History, Vol. 70 #3, 2004 pp. 577–617
- Farmer-Kaiser, Mary. "'Are They Not in Some Sorts Vagrants?' Gender and the Efforts of the Freedmen's Bureau to Combat Vagrancy in the Reconstruction South" Georgia Historical Quarterly 2004 88(1): 25–49. ISSN 0016-8297
- Faulkner, Carol. Women's Radical Reconstruction: The Freedmen's Aid Movement. U. of Pennsylvania Press, 2004. 208 pp.
- Finley, Randy. From Slavery to Uncertain Future: the Freedmen's Bureau in Arkansas, 1865–1869 U. of Arkansas Press, 1996.
- Gerteis, Louis S. From Contraband to Freedmen: Federal Policy toward Southern Blacks, 1861–1865 1973.
- Lieberman, Robert C. "The Freedmen's Bureau and the Politics of Institutional Structure" Social Science History 1994 18(3): 405–437. ISSN 0145-5532
- Lowe, Richard. "The Freedman's Bureau and Local Black Leadership" Journal of American History 1993 80(3): 989–998. ISSN 0021-8723
- Morrow Ralph Ernst. "The Northern Methodists in Reconstruction". Mississippi Valley Historical Review 41 (September 1954): 197–218. in JSTOR
- May J. Thomas. "Continuity and Change in the Labor Program of the Union Army and the Freedmen's Bureau". Civil War History 17 (September 1971): 245–254.
- Oubre, Claude F. Forty Acres and a Mule: The Freedmen's Bureau and Black Land Ownership 1978.
- Pearson, Reggie L. "'There Are Many Sick, Feeble, and Suffering Freedmen': the Freedmen's Bureau's Health-care Activities During Reconstruction in North Carolina, 1865–1868" North Carolina Historical Review 2002 79(2): 141–181. ISSN 0029-2494 .
- Quarles, Benjamin. The Negro in the Civil War. Russell & Russell. (1953)
- Richter, William L. Overreached on All Sides: The Freedmen's Bureau Administrators in Texas, 1865–1868 1991.
- Ransom, Roger L. Conflict and Compromise. Cambridge University Press. 1989. economic history
- Oubre, Claude F. Forty Acres and a Mule. (LSU Press, 1978).
- Rodrigue, John C. "Labor Militancy and Black Grassroots Political Mobilization in the Louisiana Sugar Region, 1865–1868" in Journal of Southern History, Vol. 67 #1, 2001 pp. 115–145
- Schwalm, Leslie A. "'Sweet Dreams of Freedom': Freedwomen's Reconstruction of Life and Labor in Lowcountry South Carolina" Journal of Women's History, Vol. 9 #1, 1997 pp. 9–32
- Smith, Solomon K. "The Freedmen's Bureau in Shreveport: the Struggle for Control of the Red River District" Louisiana History 2000 41(4): 435–465. ISSN 0024-6816

==== Primary sources ====
- Berlin, Ira; Fields, Barbara J.; Miller, Steven F.; Reidy, Joseph P; and Rowland, Leslie S., eds. Free at Last: A Documentary History of Slavery, Freedom, and the Civil War (New, York, 1995).
- Cimbala, Paul A. The Freedmen's Bureau: Reconstructing the American South after the Civil War (Malabar, Fla., 2005). Brief history and selection of documents.
- Hahn, Steven; Miller, Steven F.; O'Donovan, Susan E.; Rodrigue, John C., and Rowland, Leslies S., eds. Land and Labor, 1865 (Chapel Hill, N.C., 2008). Series 3, volume 1 of Freedom: A Documentary History of Emancipation, 1861–1867.
- Freedmen's Bureau Act (1865).
- Documents from Freedom: A Documentary History of Emancipation, 1861–1867
- Minutes of the Freedmen's Convention, Held in the City of Raleigh, [North Carolina] ...October, 1866
- Freedmen's Bureau Online
- Reports and Speeches
- Slave Emancipation Through the Prism of Archives Records (1997) by Joseph P. Reidy
- General Howard's report for 1869: The House of Representatives, Forty-first Congress, second session
- Elaine C. Everly, "Freedmen's Bureau Records: An Overview," Prologue, Summer 1997
- Georgia: Freedmen's Education during Reconstruction

== See also ==
- Bibliography of Ulysses S. Grant
- Bibliography of the American Civil War
