= Black in Latin America =

- Written by: Henry Louis Gates Jr.
- Directed by: Ricardo Pollack; Diene Petterle; Ilana Trachtman
- Presented by: Henry Louis Gates Jr.
- Country of origin: United States
- No. of episodes: 4

Production
- Executive producers: Henry Louis Gates Jr. Jonathan Hewes; William R. Grant
- Producer: Ricardo Pollack
- Production companies: Inkwell Films; Wall to Wall Productions; THIRTEEN

Original release
- Network: PBS
- Release: 19 April 2011 – May 10, 2011

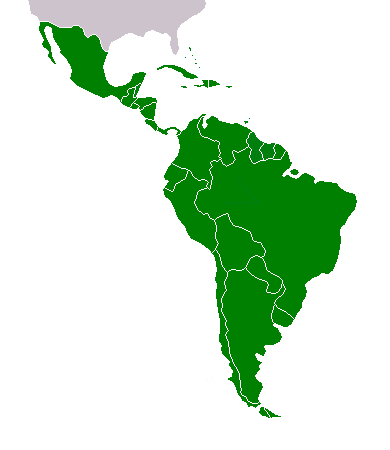
6 Latin American countries: Haiti, the Dominican Republic, Cuba, Brazil, Mexico, and Peru were chosen for the documentary.

Black in Latin America is a documentary television series that aired on PBS on April 19, 2011, in the United States. The series is based on the 2011 book Black in Latin America by Henry Louis Gates Jr., who produced the four-episode series. Both the documentary and book explore the historical roots and influence of Afro-Latin Americans. The book's chapters and the documentary's episodes each focus on individual Latin American countries whose African heritage is often overlooked. Each nation has varying perceptions of race and color, but all had policies in order to lighten the overall skin color of their population. For example, in 1933 Mexico restricted the immigration of Black people into the country, and 4 million white European immigrants were welcomed to Brazil between 1884 and 1939.

Gates' purpose behind creating the documentary was to make African-American history and present-day experiences better known within the context of Latin America. One fact highlighted by Gates was that Barack Obama was not the first black president of a multi-racial nation, but rather Vicente Guerrero, Mexico's president from April to December in 1829, was the first.

== Episodes ==
Episode information
| Episode | Title | Original air date |
|---|---|---|
| 1 | "Haiti & the Dominican Republic: An Island Divided" | April 19, 2011 |
Gates discusses the Dominican Republic's social construction of race and Haiti's history of slave liberation and the formation of a black republic. One thing Gates noticed was that while people from the U.S. would consider some Dominicans as "black," they identified as "indio" and instead viewed Haitians as "negroes." While Haiti did not have as many racial categories as other countries, it still dealt with problems between black and mulatto people.
| 2 | "Cuba: The Next Revolution" | April 26, 2011 |
Gates connects the history of slave labor with Cuba's music and culture, and also explores how the Communist revolution has affected racism in Cuba. Specifically, Gates wondered whether the health and education benefits given to all Cubans helped deal with racism in the nation.
| 3 | "Brazil: A Racial Paradise?" | May 3, 2011 |
Gates focuses on Brazil's Carnival and the country's history "as the world's largest slave economy." With 136 categories of blackness, Brazil is given the title of the "rainbow nation" in the episode's summary. Two reasons Gates chose Brazil to include in his documentary was that it is the largest country of Latin America, and it is Portuguese, in contrast with the majority of Hispanic Latin American nations.
| 4 | "Mexico & Peru: The Black Grandma in the Closet" | May 10, 2011 |
Gates discusses the history of black slaves brought to Mexico and Peru during the 1500s-1600s, in addition to the culture that is now lived by their descendants.The census in Mexico and Peru do not have a category for race, and some activists want to bring this category back because without it, many people ignore the racism existing in their nations.

== Criticism ==
There have been several critiques of Gates' work on Haiti and the Dominican Republic, including essentialist depictions and misunderstanding of popular cultural forms.

John Maddox and Michael Steinkampf of the University of Alabama wrote in a 2015 Afro-Hispanic Review article that Gates leaves out a lot of information in the second episode, "Cuba: The Next Revolution". The authors suggest that due to the strong control of media, the documentary did not provide sufficient information about racism in Cuba. Gates's book Black in Latin America provides more information on the subject.
