= The Signifying Monkey =

1988 book by Henry Louis Gates Jr.

- Author: Henry Louis Gates Jr.
- Language: English
- Genre: Non-fiction
- Publisher: Oxford University Press
- Publication date: 1988
- Publication place: United States
- Pages: 320

The Signifying Monkey: A Theory of African-American Literary Criticism is a work of literary criticism and theory by the American scholar Henry Louis Gates Jr. first published in 1988. The book traces the folkloric origins of the African-American cultural practice of "signifying" and uses the concept of signifyin(g) to analyze the interplay between texts of prominent African-American writers, specifically Richard Wright, Ralph Ellison, Zora Neale Hurston and Ishmael Reed.

Gates' title alludes to the song "Signifyin' Monkey" by Oscar Brown, recorded in 1960.

== Literary signifying ==
Signifyin(g) is closely related to double-talk and trickery of the type used by the Monkey of these narratives, but, as Gates himself admits, "It is difficult to arrive at a consensus of definitions of signifyin(g)." Bernard W. Bell defines it as an "elaborate, indirect form of goading or insult generally making use of profanity". Roger D. Abrahams writes that to signify is "to imply, goad, beg, boast by indirect verbal or gestural means". Signifyin(g) is a homonym with the concept of signification put forth by semiotician Ferdinand de Saussure wherein the signifier (sound image) interacts with the signified (concept) to form one whole linguistic sign. Gates plays off this homonym and incorporates the linguistic concept of signifier and signified with the vernacular concept of signifyin(g).

Gates defines two main types of literary Signifyin(g): oppositional (or motivated) and cooperative (or unmotivated). Unmotivated signifyin(g) takes the form of the repetition and alteration of another text, which "encode admiration and respect" and evidence "not the absence of a profound intention but the absence of a negative critique". Gates more thoroughly focuses on oppositional or motivated Signifyin(g) and how it "functions as a metaphor for formal revision, or intertextuality, within the Afro-American literary tradition". Authors reuse motifs from previous works but alter them and "signify" upon them so as to create their own meanings. Ralph Ellison revises or "signifies" upon Richard Wright's work just as Ishmael Reed goes on to signify upon both authors' work and so forth.

== Critical reception ==
On publication in 1988, The Signifying Monkey received both widespread praise and notoriety. The prominent literary critic Houston A. Baker wrote that it was "a significant move forward in Afro-American literary study" and Andrew Delbanco wrote that it put Gates "at the forefront of the most significant reappraisal of African-American critical thought since the 1960s". It won an American Book Award in 1989. However, it was also closely scrutinized to the point of "being more talked about than read, more excoriated than understood". Complaints against it include that Gates's focus is exclusively Afrocentric, that he presupposes the signifying tradition and then fits his evidence to conform to the tradition, and that he is guilty of circular logic. Nonetheless, The Signifying Monkey has helped contribute to the reputation of Gates as being, along with Houston Baker, one of the two most important African-American literary theorists of the late 20th and early 21st centuries.

== See also ==
- Signifying Rappers: Rap and Race in the Urban Present (1989), contemporary text examining signifyin(g) from a literary theoretical perspective
