= Signifyin' =

Wordplay in Black American communities; emphasizes connotation over literal meaning

Signifyin' (sometimes written "signifyin(g)") is a practice in African-American culture and African-American Vernacular English involving a verbal strategy of indirection that exploits the gap between the denotative and figurative meanings of words. A simple example would be insulting someone to show them affection. Other names for signifyin' include: "Dropping lugs, joaning, sounding, capping, snapping, dissing, busting, bagging, janking, ranking, toasting, woofing, roasting, putting on, or cracking."

Signifyin' directs attention to the connotative, context-bound significance of words, which is accessible only to those who share the cultural values of a given speech community. The expression comes from stories about the signifying monkey, a trickster figure said to have originated during slavery in the United States. Signifyin’ can also be a critical mode, through which African diaspora figures like Jean-Michel Basquiat and Walter J. Hood have expressed their work.

The American literary critic Henry Louis Gates Jr. wrote in The Signifying Monkey (1988) that signifyin' is "a trope, in which are subsumed several other rhetorical tropes, including metaphor, metonymy, synecdoche, and irony (the master tropes), and also hyperbole, litotes, and metalepsis. To this list we could easily add aporia, chiasmus, and catachresis, all of which are used in the ritual of Signifyin(g)."

== Origin and features ==
Rudy Ray Moore, known as "Dolemite", is well known for having used the term in his comedic performances. While signifyin(g) is the term cited by Henry Louis Gates Jr. to represent a black vernacular, the idea stems from the thoughts of Ferdinand De Saussure and the process of signifying—"the association between words and the ideas they indicate." Gates states, "'Signification,' in standard English, denotes the meaning that a term conveys, or is intended to convey." Gates takes this idea of signifying and "doubles" it in order to explain signifyin(g). He states of black vernacular, "their complex act of language Signifies upon both formal language use and its conventions, conventions established, at least officially, by middle-class white people." Signifyin(g) can be used to break the "pattern and regulation" of dominant speech.

=== Power relations ===
Signifyin(g) is often used by African-Americans to challenge existing power structures or powerful figures, re-contextualizing an entity's perceived strengths as weaknesses. Aggression and directness are used when signifyin(g) between friends or equals, but between those of different power positions, "indirection, implication, and innuendo" are used as tools to disrupt hierarchy.

=== Signifying Monkey ===
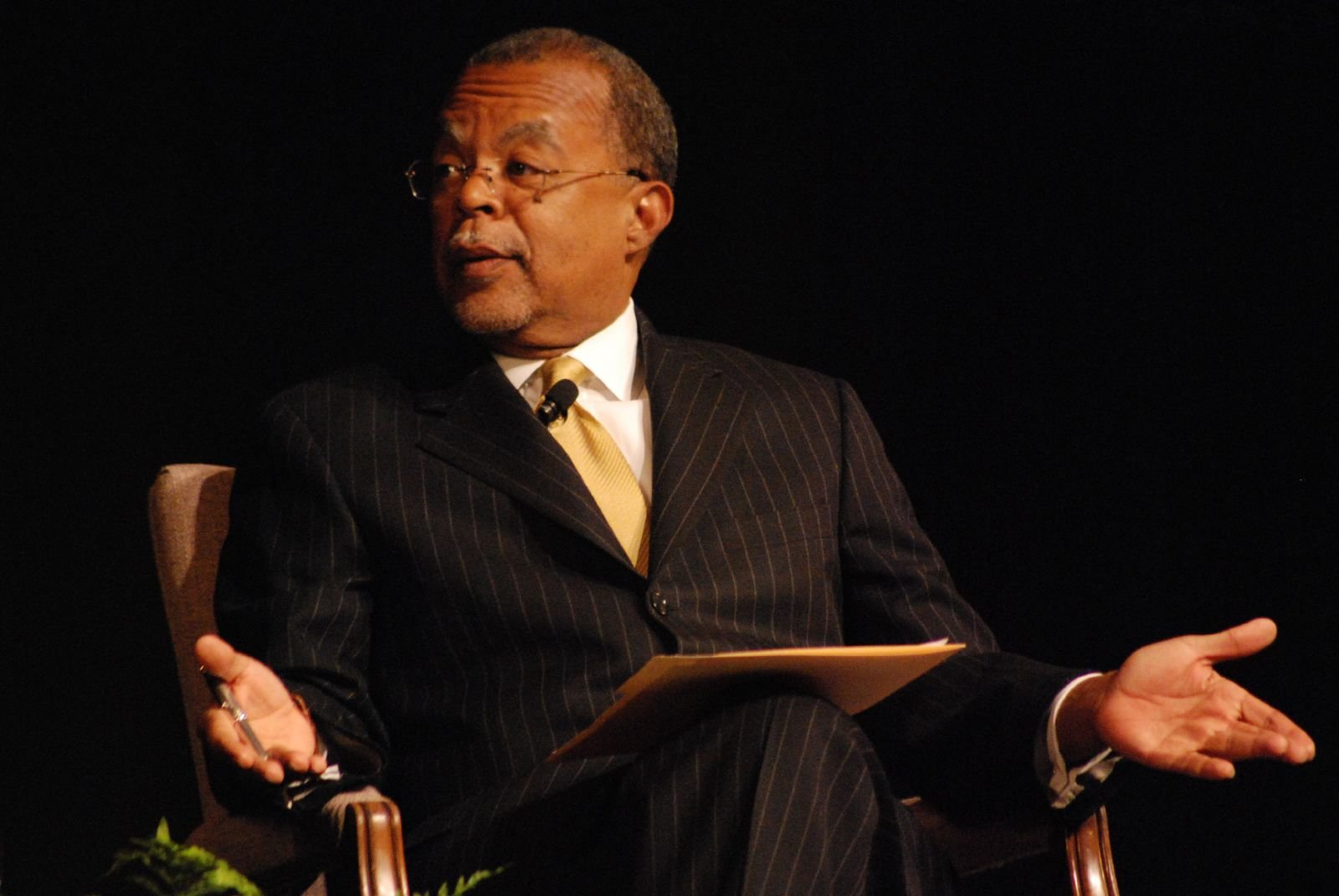
Henry Louis Gates Jr. writes that thinking about signifyin' is like "stumbling unaware into a hall of mirrors," hence the action of doubling.

Gates examines the ways in which signifyin(g) differs from signifying.

According to Gates, the practice derived from the trickster archetype found in much African mythology, folklore, and religion: a god, goddess, spirit, man, woman, or anthropomorphic animal who plays tricks or otherwise disobeys normal rules and societal norms. In practice, signifyin' often takes the form of quoting from sub-cultural vernacular, while extending the meaning at the same time through a rhetorical figure.

The expression itself derives from the numerous tales about the signifying monkey, a folk trickster figure said to have originated during slavery in the United States. In most of these narratives, the monkey manages to dupe the powerful lion by signifying.

=== Linguistics ===
The term signifyin' itself currently carries a range of metaphorical and theoretical meanings in black cultural studies that stretch far beyond its literal scope of reference. In The Signifying Monkey, Gates expands the term to refer not merely to a specific vernacular strategy but also to a trope of double-voiced repetition and reversal that exemplifies the distinguishing property of black discourse. However, this subtle African-American device, if linguistically analyzed, becomes notoriously difficult to pin down, as Gates writes:

Thinking about the black concept of Signifiyin(g) is a bit like stumbling unaware into a hall of mirrors: the sign itself appears to be doubled, at the very least, and (re)doubled upon ever closer examination. It is not the sign itself, however, which has multiplied. If orientation prevails over madness, we soon realize that only the signifier has been doubled and (re)doubled, a signifier in this instance that is silent, a "sound-image" as Saussure defines the signifier, but a "sound-image" sans the sound. The difficulty that we experience when thinking about the nature of the visual (re)doubling at work in a hall of mirrors is analogous to the difficulty we shall encounter in relating the black linguistic sign, "Signification," to the standard English sign, "signification." This level of conceptual difficulty stems from—indeed, seems, to have been intentionally inscribed within—the selection of the signifier, "signification." For the standard English word is a homonym of the Afro-American vernacular word. And, to compound the dizziness and giddiness that we must experience in the vertiginous movement between these two "identical" signifiers, these two homonyms have everything to do with each other and, then again, absolutely nothing.

Gates, in "The Signifying Monkey and the Language of Signifyin(g)" clarifies the confusing nature of the subject matter by representing the two terms on a graph made up of intercepting x-axis and a y-axis. The x-axis is represented by the standard English that white people recognize and use within most professional and educational settings. Simply put, the x-axis is the literal definition of a word as represented by the masses and the term coined by Saussure. The y-axis, however, is represented by the term signifyin(g) and is labelled as "black vernacular." As Gates represents, "the relation of signification itself has been critiqued by a black act of (re)doubling" in which the point of intersection permits new understandings of a term to take place. Where the x-axis and y-axis intersect, the two meanings of the word collide to form a new meaning, so often represented by puns and tropes.

By viewing signifyin(g) as a graph, such as Gates represents, the doubling nature of black vernacular becomes apparent. As Gates exhibits, "the English-language use of signification refers to the chain of signifiers that configures horizontally," or all accepted definitions of a term as represented by standard English. The y-axis of black vernacular, however, "concerns itself with that which is suspended, vertically...the playful puns on a word that occupy the paradigmatic axis of language and which a speaker draws on for figurative substitution." A term may share a name but the definitions may be completely different.

=== Space ===
Signifyin(g) may also be used in describing physical space. Architect Scott Ruff, for instance, argued that African-Americans' creation of secret pathways and clearings behind slave plantations constituted signifyin(g). Their loose and meandering use of physical space countered the rigid boundaries of the plantation, and provided space for cultural expression among enslaved people. Walter Hood has also demonstrated signifyin(g) in his works, which serve as adaptable, self-expressive, historically-rooted, and transposed spaces, influenced by African-American spatial practices.

== Examples ==
An example of signifyin' is "playing the dozens". The dozens is a game in which participants seek to outdo each other by throwing insults back and forth. Tom Kochman offered as an example in Rappin' and Stylin' Out: Communication in Urban Black America (1972): "Yo momma sent her picture to the lonely hearts club, but they sent it back and said, 'We ain't that lonely!'"

Gena Dagel Caponi describes "calls, cries, hollers, riffs, licks, overlapping antiphony" as examples of signifying in hip hop music and other African-American music. She explains that signifyin' differs from simple repetition and from simple variation in that it uses material:

rhetorically or figuratively—through troping, in other words—by trifling with, teasing, or censuring it in some way. Signifyin(g) is also a way of demonstrating respect for, goading, or poking fun at a musical style, process, or practice through parody, pastische, implication, indirection, humor, tone- or word-play, the illusions of speech, or narration, and other troping mechanisms... Signifyin(g) shows, among other things, either reverence or irreverence toward previously stated musical statements and values."

Schloss relates this to the ambiguity common to African musics, including looping (as of a sample), for "it allows individuals to demonstrate intellectual power while simultaneously obscuring the nature and extent of their agency ... It allows producers to use other people's music to convey their own compositional ideas".

Several academics have argued that "Black Twitter" has become a form of signifyin'. Sarah Florini of the University of Wisconsin-Madison writes that race is normally tied to "corporeal signifiers." Online, in the absence of the body, black users perform their racial identity using wordplay that only those with knowledge of black culture can fully recognize.

Claudia Mitchell-Kernan, recognized as the first scholar to interject African American women's signifyin' practices into broader linguistic discourses, recorded the following example: Grace is pregnant and beginning to show, but has not informed her sister yet. Her sister, seemingly unaware of the situation, comments on her weight gain: "Grace (noncommittally): Yes, I guess I am putting on a little weight. Rochelle: Now look here, girl, we both standing here soaking wet and you still trying to tell me it ain’t raining?"

== Critical reception ==
In their article "Henry Louis Gates, Jr. and Current Debate in African-American Literary Criticism, An Introduction", Roger Matuz and Cathy Falk explore the criticism that the term signifyin(g) has faced since its introduction in Gates' text, The Signifying Monkey: a Theory of African-American Literary Criticism. The main criticism that Gates faces is a confusion surrounding the ideas of a black literary theory informed by Western thought—the same thought that created a purpose for the term signifyin(g). Gates responds to these critiques by arguing for "text specific readings of black literature that explore works in relation to themselves and each other rather than viewing them as literal reflections of historical or social aspects of African American society." This conversation between texts is the redoubling that comprises signifyin(g).

Joyce A. Joyce states that Gates is too far removed from the black experience: "Black creative art is an act of love which attempts to destroy estrangement and elitism by demonstrating a strong fondness or enthusiasm for freedom and an affectionate concern for the life of people, especially black people... It should be the job of the Black literary critic to force ideas to the surface, to give them force in order to affect, to guide, to animate and to arouse the minds and emotions of black people."

Other critics, however, support Gates and the term signifyin(g), noting its "subversive" nature and ability to bring about change to a system.

== See also ==
1. Epideixis
2. Signifying Rapper by Schooly D
3. Signifying Rappers: Rap and Race in the Urban Present
