= Africa's Great Civilizations =

2017 television series

- DVD Cover
- Genre: Documentary
- Written by: Henry Louis Gates Jr.
- Directed by: Virginia Quinn; Mark Bates
- Presented by: Henry Louis Gates, Jr.
- Composer: Tom Howe
- Country of origin: United States
- Original language: English
- No. of seasons: 1
- No. of episodes: 6

Production
- Producers: Virginia Quinn; Mark Bates
- Cinematography: Graham Smith; Duane McLunie; Jim Bishop; Gary Clarke; Eli Gamson; Nic Hofmeyr; Tom Pridham
- Editors: Guy Scutter; Doug Howarth; Daniel Garcia Robles; Anthony Willis
- Running time: 52–53 minutes per episode
- Production companies: Inkwell Films; McGee Media; Kunhardt Films; WETA

Original release
- Network: PBS
- Release: February 27 – March 1, 2017

Africa's Great Civilizations is a PBS six-hour television series hosted and written by Henry Louis Gates Jr. It aired on PBS in the United States from February 27, 2017, to March 1, 2017.

== Summary ==
In the series, Gates chronicles African history starting with the birth of humankind to the start of the 20th century. The show portrays 200,000 years of Africa's history and touches on subjects from the arts to writing and the dawn of civilization to the 21st century.

== Episodes ==
| No. | Title | Original release date |
|---|---|---|
| 1 | "Origins" | February 27, 2017 |
Omo River, Mitochondrial Eve, Nubian pyramids, Bantu expansion
| 2 | "The Cross and the Crescent" | February 27, 2017 |
Yeha, North African Christian theologians, Islam in Africa, the Ethiopian Orthodox Church, Lake Tana
| 3 | "Empires of Gold" | February 28, 2017 |
Fez, Timbuktu, University of al-Qarawiyyin, Mali Empire
| 4 | "Cities" | February 28, 2017 |
Kilwa, Great Zimbabwe, Benin, Gondar
| 5 | "The Atlantic Age" | March 1, 2017 |
Kingdom of Kongo, Nzinga of Ndongo and Matamba, Ouidah, the Atlantic slave trade
| 6 | "Commerce and the Clash of Civilizations" | March 1, 2017 |
Zulu Kingdom, Zanzibar, the Scramble for Africa, Ethiopian Empire

== Release ==
On April 26, 2017, Gates introduced the series at the United Nations. The event was spearheaded by the Africa-America Institute. The series was released on both Blu-ray and DVD on May 16, 2017.

== Reception ==
The New York Times praised the series, but said it would have been good if it made more connections between the civilizations of the past and modern Africa. Multifaith website Spirituality & Practice called the series "ambitious and poignant;" while the UK Independent called it "Endlessly enthralling and tremendously dramatic."
