= Signifying monkey =

Character in Black American folklore; trickster figure

The signifying monkey is a character of African-American folklore that derives from the trickster figure of Yoruba mythology, Esu Elegbara. This character was transported with Africans to the Americas under the names of Exu, Echu-Elegua, Papa Legba, and Papa Le Bas. Esu and his variants all serve as messengers who mediated between the gods and men by means of tricks. The signifying monkey is "distinctly Afro-American" but is thought to derive from Yoruban mythology, which depicts Echu-Elegua with a monkey at his side.

Numerous songs and narratives concern the signifying monkey and his interactions with his friends, the lion and the elephant. In general, the stories depict the signifying monkey insulting the lion, but claiming that he is only repeating the elephant's words. The lion then confronts the elephant, who in turn physically assaults the lion. The lion later realizes that the monkey has been signifyin' and has duped the lion, and as a result the lion angrily returns to castrate the monkey and renders him unable to reproduce.
