= Black and Jewish America: An Interwoven History =

American documentary series

- Genre: Documentary
- Country of origin: United States
- Original language: English
- No. of episodes: 4

Production
- Executive producers: Henry Louis Gates Jr.; Dyllan McGee; Rachel Dretzin
- Producer: Kevin Burke
- Cinematography: Jerry Henry
- Editors: Anne Yao; Ephraim Kirkwood
- Running time: 52 minutes
- Production companies: Inkwell Media; McGee Media; WETA-TV

Original release
- Network: PBS
- Release: February 3 – February 17, 2026

Black and Jewish America: An Interwoven History is a 2026 American documentary series hosted, written, and executive produced by Henry Louis Gates Jr., it explores the complex relationship between African Americans and American Jews.

It premiered on February 3, 2026, on PBS.

== Premise ==
Explores the complex relationship between African Americans and American Jews. Billy Crystal, Tony Kushner, Anna Deavere Smith, Al Sharpton, David Remnick, Nate Looney, Angela Buchdahl, Michael W. Twitty, Jamaica Kincaid and Shais Rishon are among the participants in the series.

== Episodes ==
No.	Title	Directed by	Original release date
1	"Let My People Go"	Julia Marchesi; Sara Wolitzky	February 3, 2026
2	"Strange Fruit"	Phil Bertelsen	February 10, 2026
3	"The Grand Alliance"	Unknown	February 17, 2026
4	"Crossroads"	Unknown	February 17, 2026

== Production ==
Henry Louis Gates Jr. reconnected with Phil Bertelsen and Sara Wolitzky after being alarmed by the rise in white supremacist hate crimes, and decided to make a series about the interwoven history between African Americans and American Jews. Production commenced in the fall of 2024, with the intention of the production team consisting of both communities.
