= Stony the Road =

2019 nonfiction book by Henry Louis Gates Jr.

Stony the Road: Reconstruction, White Supremacy, and the Rise of Jim Crow
- Author: Henry Louis Gates Jr.
- Publisher: Penguin Press
- Publication date: 2019
- Media type: Print
- Pages: 320
- ISBN: 978-0525559559
- OCLC: 1149245395

Stony the Road: Reconstruction, White Supremacy, and the Rise of Jim Crow is a 2019 nonfiction book written by Henry Louis Gates Jr. covering African-American history during the Reconstruction era, Redemption era, and the New Negro Movement.

== Background ==
Stony the Road is a spiritual successor to Eric Foner's Reconstruction: America's Unfinished Revolution - 1863-1877. Gates derived his book's title from a James Weldon Johnson lyric in "Lift Every Voice and Sing": "Stony the road we trod / Bitter the chast'ning rod".

Gates was inspired to reexamine the Reconstruction era in part as a response to recent white supremacist terror incidents in the U.S., such as the 2015 Charleston church shooting. He also wanted to study precedents in growing African-American political power.

== Contents ==
Stony the Road offers a historical overview of the social advances of Reconstruction, the subsequent rollback of those policies with the resurgence of white supremacy during the Redemption period, and the attempts by African-Americans to change the cultural image of black people in the U.S. during the Harlem Renaissance, otherwise known as the New Negro Movement. Between chapters, there are illustrations and photographs to contrast the historically pervasive anti-black racist iconography with more affirming media from the New Negro Movement.

== Reception ==
Stony the Road received positive reviews in The New York Times, NPR, The Nation, The Washington Post, and The New Yorker.

Publicity for the book was enhanced when Gates hosted a four-hour PBS documentary series in April 2019 entitled "Reconstruction: America after the Civil War", with material drawn from his research on Stony the Road.
