= How Curious a Land =

How Curious a Land: Conflict and Change in Greene County Georgia 1850-1885
- Author: Jonathan M. Bryant
- Language: English
- Genre: American History
- Publisher: University of North Carolina Press
- Publication date: 1996, 2004
- Publication place: United States
- Media type: Print (Hardback & Paperback)
- Pages: 266

How Curious a Land: Conflict and Change in Greene County Georgia 1850-1885 is a history of a Georgia plantation community from 1855 to 1885. The book looks at the political, economic and the role of the law and society passing through the Civil War and Reconstruction. It was written by Dr. Jonathan M. Bryant of Georgia Southern University. It was published in 1996 by the University of North Carolina Press. It was republished in 2004 as a paperback.

== Summary ==
How Curious a Land is a study of Greene County, a wealthy plantation county in Georgia, from the height of Antebellum success through the American Civil War and emancipation. As Dr. Bryant explains in the preface, he intended to write "a study of the social, economic, and legal transformations of a cotton plantation from before the Civil War to the New South."

In his work, How Curious a Land, Bryant shows how the local elite whites used the law and the legal system to maintain and extend their power. Before the Civil War, Greene County was controlled by a small group of wealthy slave owning planters. These men used the legal and social structures of slavery, marriage, and capitalism to maintain and increase their wealth and power. Lawyers and merchants played a secondary role in the power structure as facilitators of the planters' power. The majority of whites in the county were small farmers, craftsmen, or tenant farmers. More than sixty percent of the county's population were slaves working on cotton plantations. These plantations produced huge amounts of wealth for the plantation elite.

== Historical value ==
The Civil War brought severe economic and social challenges which eventually drained most planters of their wealth, destroyed the slave labor system and even changed gender roles. The emancipation of two-thirds of Greene County's population in 1865 seemed at first a death knell for the old order. Black leaders such as Abram Colby were elected to the State Assembly, and Republicans controlled local politics, but they were not able to control the legal system, which remained in the hands of conservative Democrats. The old order was able to use the legal system to destroy black Republican power. This was accomplished by 1880 when most blacks were reduced to dependent landless laborers producing cotton once again for the world market. Most whites were still small farmers or craftsmen or also becoming tenant farmers. A new white elite made up of lawyers and merchants displaced the old cotton planters, although in many cases they were the old planters or the planters' sons.

== Critical review ==
The Law and History Review calls it a "deeply researched and eloquently written book." The Virginia Quarterly Review states that it is a "model history of a Southern place."
