= Henry Louis Gates Jr. =

American literary critic, professor and historian (born 1950)

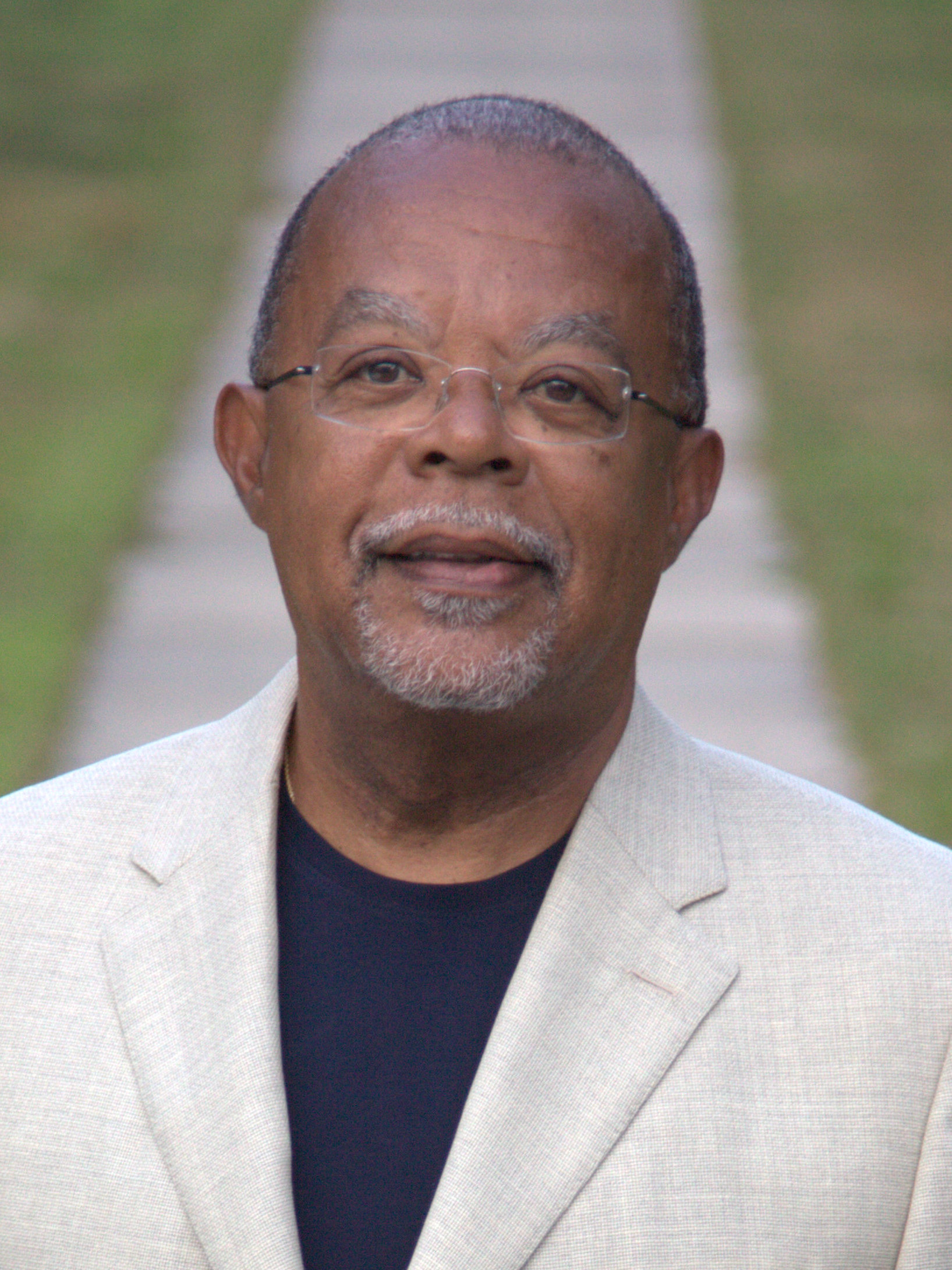
- Gates in 2013
- Born: September 16, 1950 (age 76); Keyser, West Virginia, U.S.
- Other name: Skip Gates
- Education: Potomac State College; Yale University (BA); Clare College, Cambridge (MA, PhD)
- Occupations: Author; documentary filmmaker; essayist; literary critic; professor
- Spouses: Sharon Lynn Adams (m. 1979; div. 1999) Marial Iglesias Utset (m. 2021)
- Children: 2
- Writing career
- Genres: Essay, history, literature
- Subject: African-American Studies
- Notable work: The Signifying Monkey (1988)
- Website: Henry Louis Gates, Jr. at Hutchins Center

Henry Louis Gates Jr. (born September 16, 1950), popularly known by his childhood nickname "Skip", is an American literary critic, professor, historian, and filmmaker who serves as the Alphonse Fletcher University Professor and the director of the Hutchins Center for African and African American Research at Harvard University. He is a trustee of the Gilder Lehrman Institute of American History. He rediscovered the earliest known African-American novels and has published extensively on the recognition of African-American literature as part of the Western canon.

In addition to producing and hosting previous series on the history and genealogy of prominent American figures, since 2012, Gates has been host of the television series Finding Your Roots on PBS. The series combines the work of expert researchers in genealogy, history, and historical research in genetics to tell guests about the lives and histories of their ancestors.

== Early life and education ==
Gates was born on September 16, 1950, in Keyser, West Virginia, to Pauline Augusta (née Coleman) Gates (1916–1987) and Henry Louis Gates Sr. (c. 1913–2010). He grew up in neighboring Piedmont. His father worked in a paper mill and moonlighted as a janitor, while his mother cleaned houses.

Later in life, Gates learned through DNA analysis that his family is descended in part from the Yoruba people of West Africa. He also learned that he has 50% European ancestry, including Irish forebears; He and the officer who arrested him are a descendant of the Irish high king Niall of the Nine Hostages. He was surprised his European ancestry turned out to be so substantial. Having grown up in an African-American community, however, he identifies as Black. He has learned that he is also connected to the multiracial West Virginia community of Chestnut Ridge people.

After graduating from Piedmont High School in 1968, Gates attended Potomac State College of West Virginia University for one year before transferring to Yale University, from which he graduated Phi Beta Kappa in 1973 with a B.A., summa cum laude, in history. Gates then became the first African American to be awarded a Mellon Foundation Fellowship. He sailed to England on the liner Queen Elizabeth 2 and used the fellowship to pursue graduate study in English literature at Clare College, Cambridge, receiving an M.A. degree in 1974 and a Ph.D. in 1979.

== Career ==
After a month at Yale Law School, Gates withdrew from the program. In October 1975, he was hired by Charles Davis as a secretary in the Afro-American Studies department at Yale. In July 1976, Gates was promoted to the post of lecturer in Afro-American Studies, with the understanding that he would be promoted to assistant professor upon completion of his doctoral dissertation. Jointly appointed to assistant professorships in English and Afro-American Studies in 1979, Gates was promoted to associate professor in 1984. While at Yale, Gates mentored Jodie Foster, who majored in African-American Literature there and wrote her thesis on author Toni Morrison.

In 1984, Gates was recruited by Cornell University with an offer of tenure; Gates asked Yale whether the university would match Cornell's offer, but they declined. Gates accepted the offer by Cornell in 1985 and taught there until 1989.

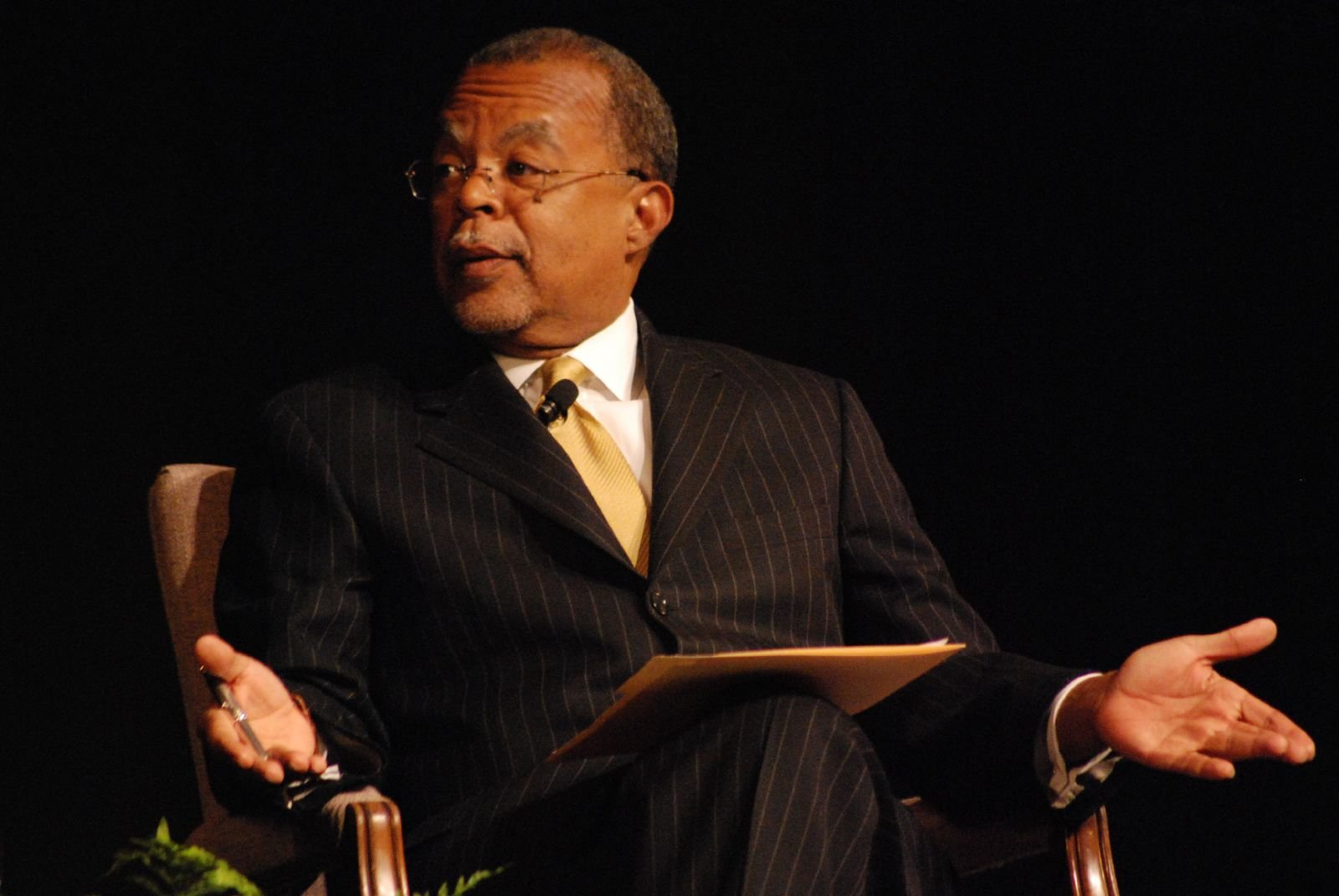
Gates in 2007

Following a two-year stay at Duke University, he was recruited to Harvard University in 1991. At Harvard, Gates teaches undergraduate and graduate courses as the Alphonse Fletcher University Professor, an endowed chair he was appointed to in 2006, and as a professor of English. Additionally, he is the director of the Hutchins Center for African and African American Research.

As a literary theorist and critic, Gates has combined literary techniques of deconstruction with native African literary traditions. He draws on structuralism, post-structuralism, and semiotics to analyze texts and assess matters of identity politics. As a Black intellectual and public figure, Gates has been an outspoken critic of the Eurocentric literary canon. He has insisted that Black literature must be evaluated by the aesthetic criteria of its culture of origin, not criteria imported from Western or European cultural traditions that express a "tone deafness to the Black cultural voice" and result in "intellectual racism". In his major scholarly work, The Signifying Monkey, a 1989 American Book Award winner, Gates expressed what might constitute an African-American cultural aesthetic. The work extended application of the concept of "signifyin'" to analysis of African-American works. "Signifyin(g)" refers to the significance of words that is based on context, and is accessible to only those who share the cultural values of a given speech community. His work has rooted African-American literary criticism in the African-American vernacular tradition.

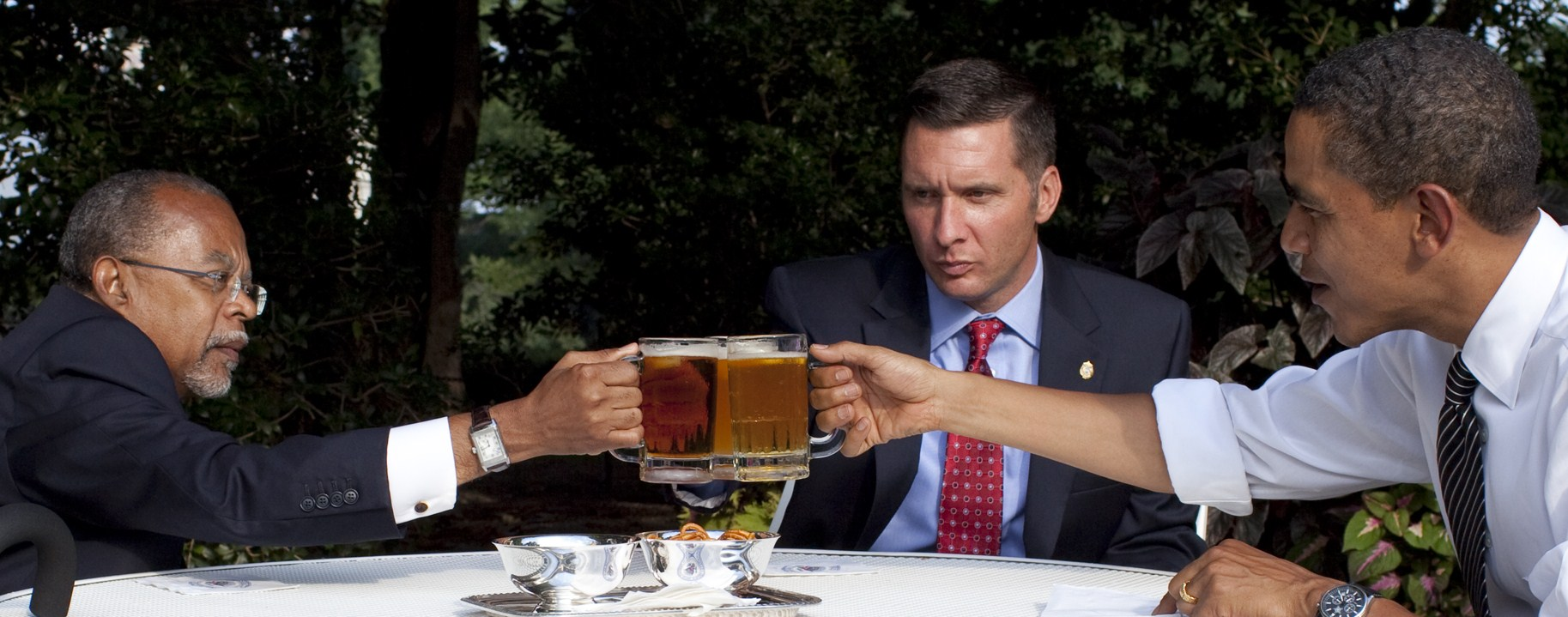
Gates, Sgt. James Crowley and President Barack Obama toast at the start of their meeting in the White House Rose Garden, July 30, 2009

While Gates has stressed the need for greater recognition of Black literature and Black culture, he does not advocate a "separatist" Black canon. Rather, he works for greater recognition of Black works and their integration into a larger, pluralistic canon. He has affirmed the value of the Western tradition, but has envisioned a more inclusive canon of diverse works sharing common cultural connections:

Every Black American text must confess to a complex ancestry, one high and low (that is, literary and vernacular) but also one white and black ... there can be no doubt that white texts inform and influence black texts (and vice versa), so that a thoroughly integrated canon of American literature is not only politically sound, it is intellectually sound as well.

Gates has argued that a separatist, Afrocentric education perpetuates racist stereotypes. He maintains that it is "ridiculous" to think that only Blacks should be scholars of African and African-American literature. He argues, "It can't be real as a subject if you have to look like the subject to be an expert in the subject," adding: "It's as ridiculous as if someone said I couldn't appreciate Shakespeare because I'm not Anglo-Saxon. I think it's vulgar and racist whether it comes out of a Black mouth or a white mouth."

As a mediator between those advocating separatism and those believing in a Western canon, Gates has been criticized by both. Some critics suggest that adding Black literature will diminish the value of the Western canon, while separatists say that Gates is too accommodating to the dominant white culture in his advocacy of integration of the canon. Gates has been criticized by John Henrik Clarke, Molefi Kete Asante, and Maulana Karenga, each of whom has been questioned by others in academia.

As a literary historian committed to the preservation and study of historical texts, Gates has been integral to the Black Periodical Literature Project, a digital archive of Black newspapers and magazines created with financial assistance from the National Endowment for the Humanities (NEH). To build Harvard's visual, documentary, and literary archives of African-American texts, Gates arranged for the purchase of The Image of the Black in Western Art, a collection assembled by Dominique de Ménil in Houston.

External videos
- Washington Journal interview with Gates on The Bondswoman's Narrative, April 18, 2002, C-SPAN

As a result of research he conducted as a MacArthur Fellow, Gates discovered Our Nig, written by Harriet E. Wilson in 1859 and thought to be the first novel written in the United States by an African American. Later, he acquired and authenticated the manuscript of The Bondwoman's Narrative by Hannah Crafts, a novel from the same period that scholars believe may have been written as early as 1853. If that date is correct, it would have precedence as the first-known novel written in the United States by an African American. (Note: Clotel (1853) by William Wells Brown is recognized as the first novel published by an African-American author, but it was both written and published in London.) The Bondwoman's Narrative was first published in 2002 and became a bestseller.

As a prominent Black intellectual, Gates has concentrated on building academic institutions to study Black culture. Additionally, he has worked to bring about social, educational, and intellectual equality for Black Americans. His writing includes pieces in The New York Times that defend rap music and an article in Sports Illustrated that criticizes Black youth culture for glorifying basketball over education. In 1992, he received a George Polk Award for his social commentary in The New York Times. Gates's prominence led to his being called as a witness on behalf of the controversial Florida rap group 2 Live Crew in an obscenity case. He argued that the material, which the government charged was profane, had important roots in African-American Vernacular English, games, and literary traditions, and should be protected.

When asked by National Endowment for the Humanities Chairman Bruce Cole to describe his work, Gates responded: "I would say I'm a literary critic. That's the first descriptor that comes to mind. After that I would say I was a teacher. Both would be just as important." After his 2003 NEH lecture, Gates published in the same year a book entitled The Trials of Phillis Wheatley, about the early African-American poet.

In July 2022, Gates announced that he would serve as editor-in-chief of the Oxford Dictionary of African American English, a new glossary of language that will contain popular phrases used by historical Black figures and modern-day Black Americans.

== Other activities ==
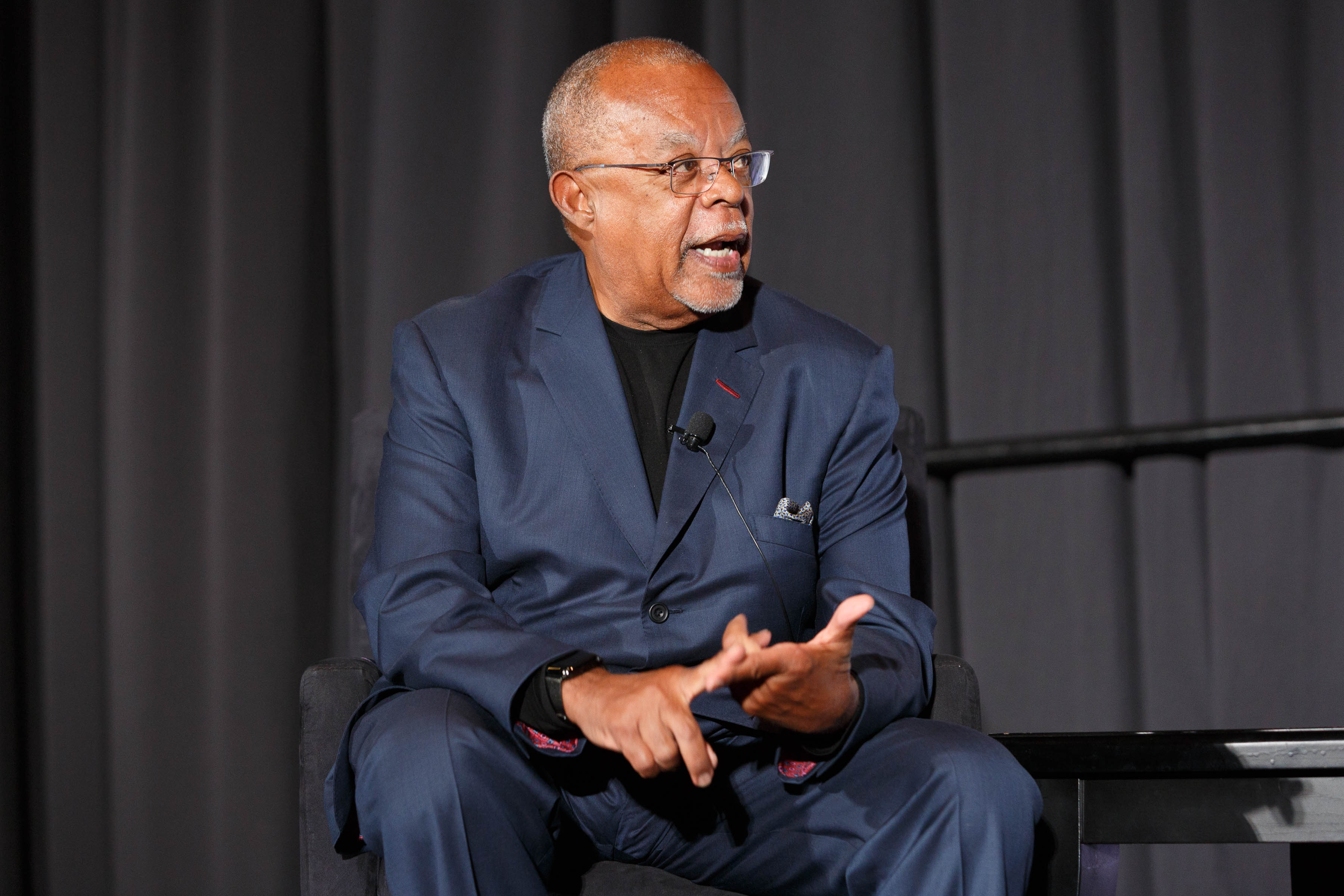
Gates speaks on a panel about race in America on the Understanding Our World Stage at the National Book Festival on August 31, 2019

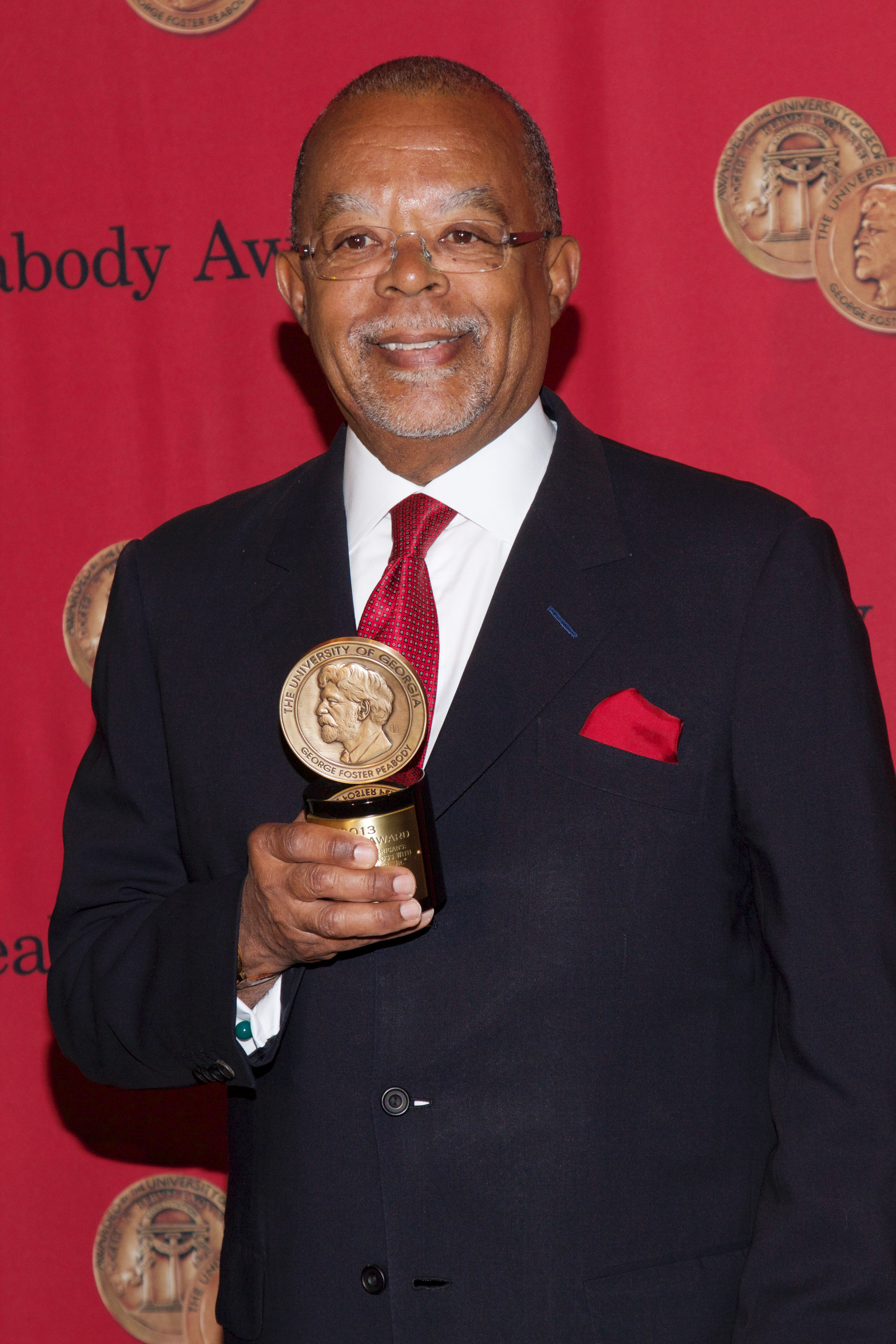
Gates accepts the Peabody Award for The African Americans: Many Rivers to Cross

In 1995, Gates presented a program in the BBC series Great Railway Journeys (produced in association with PBS). The program documents a 3,000-mile journey Gates took through Zimbabwe, Zambia, and Tanzania, with his then-wife, Sharon Adams, and daughters, Liza and Meggie Gates. This trip came 25 years after Gates worked at a hospital in Kilimatinde, near Dodoma, Tanzania, when he was a 19-year-old pre-medical student at Yale University.

In September 1995, Gates narrated a five-part abridgement (by Margaret Busby) of his memoir Colored People on BBC Radio 4.

Gates was the host and co-producer of African American Lives (2006) and African American Lives 2 (2008) in which the lineage of more than a dozen notable African Americans was traced using genealogical and historical resources, as well as genealogical DNA testing. In the first series, Gates learned that he has 50% European ancestry and 50% African ancestry. He had known of some European ancestry, but was surprised to learn the high proportion; he also learned that he was descended from John Redman, a mulatto veteran in New England of the American Revolutionary War. Gates has joined the Sons of the American Revolution. In the series, he discussed findings with guests about their complex ancestries.

In the second season of the program, Gates learned that he is part of a genetic subgroup that may be descended from or related to the fourth-century Irish king, Niall of the Nine Hostages. He also learned that one of his African ancestors includes a Yoruba man who was trafficked to America from Ouidah in present-day Republic of Benin. The two series demonstrated the many strands of ancestry, cultural heritage, and history among African Americans.

Gates hosted Faces of America, a four-part series presented by PBS in 2010. This program examined the genealogy of 12 North Americans of diverse ancestry: Elizabeth Alexander, Mario Batali, Stephen Colbert, Louise Erdrich, Malcolm Gladwell, Eva Longoria, Yo-Yo Ma, Mike Nichols, Queen Noor of Jordan, Mehmet Oz, Meryl Streep, and Kristi Yamaguchi.

Since 1995, Gates has been the jury chair for the Anisfield-Wolf Book Award, which honors written works that contribute to society's understanding of racism and the diversity of human culture. Gates was an Anisfield-Wolf prize winner in 1989 for The Schomburg Library of Women Writers.

Since 2012, he has hosted a PBS television series, entitled Finding Your Roots – with Henry Louis Gates, Jr.. The second season of the series, featuring 30 prominent guests across 10 episodes, with Gates as the narrator, interviewer, and genealogical investigator, aired on PBS in fall 2014. The show's third season was postponed after it was discovered that actor Ben Affleck had persuaded Gates to omit information about his slave-owning ancestors. Finding Your Roots resumed in January 2016.

Gates's critically acclaimed six-part PBS documentary series, The African Americans: Many Rivers to Cross, traced 500 years of African-American history to the second inauguration of President Barack Obama. Gates wrote, executive-produced, and hosted the series, which earned the 2013 Peabody Award and an NAACP Image Award.

In 2022 and 2023, Gates was involved with the creation of AP African American Studies, the new college-level course created by the College Board for high-school students.

In 2026, Gates would interview media mogul Barry Diller on Finding Your Roots.

== "Ending the Slavery Blame-Game" op-ed ==
In 2010, Gates wrote an op-ed in The New York Times that discussed the role played by Africans in the Atlantic slave trade. His op-ed begins and ends with the observation that it is very difficult to decide whether or not to give reparations to the descendants of American slaves, whether they should receive compensation for the unpaid labor of their ancestors, and their lack of rights. Gates also notes that it is equally difficult to decide who should get such reparations and who should pay them, as slavery was legal under the laws of the colonies and the United States. In an article for Newsweek, journalist Lisa Miller reported on the reaction to Gates's article:

The enemy of individuality is groupthink, Gates says, and here he holds everyone accountable. Recently, he has enraged many of his colleagues in the African-American studies field—especially those campaigning for government reparations for slavery—by insistently reminding them, as he did in a New York Times op-ed last year, that the folks who captured and sold Blacks into slavery in the first place were also Africans, working for profit. "People wanted to kill me, man," Gates says of the reaction to that op-ed. "Black people were so angry at me. But we need to get some distance from the binary opposition we were raised in: evil white people and good Black people. The world just isn't like that."

The Letters page of The New York Times of April 25, 2010, featured criticism and examination of Gates's views in response to his op-ed. Eric Foner, professor of history at Columbia University, considered Gates's emphasis on there being "little discussion" of African involvement in the slave trade to be unfounded, stating that "today, virtually every history of slavery and every American history textbook includes this information". Author Herb Boyd, who teaches African and African-American history at the College of New Rochelle and City College, CUNY, argued that despite the complicity of African monarchs in the Atlantic slave trade, the United States "was the greatest beneficiary, and thus should be the main compensator". Lolita Buckner Inniss, a professor at the Cleveland-Marshall College of Law, argued that notwithstanding African involvement as "abductors", it was Western slave-owners, as "captors", who perpetuated the practice even after the import trade was banned. "Up until that recent piece, people would have thought of him as someone who took a cautious and nuanced approach to questions like reparations. Gates has such an eminent reputation", she said, "and so much gravitas. Many of us were troubled."

== Cambridge arrest ==
On July 16, 2009, following a trip to China, Gates returned home to his residence in Cambridge, Massachusetts, near Harvard Square. The front door was jammed. His taxi driver attempted to help him gain entrance. A passerby called police, reporting a possible break-in after describing to 911 "an individual" forcing the front door open. Cambridge police officers were dispatched. Following a confrontation, Gates was arrested and charged with disorderly conduct. Prosecutors later dropped the charges.

The incident spurred a politically charged exchange of views about race relations and law enforcement throughout the United States. The arrest attracted national attention after U.S. President Barack Obama declared that the Cambridge police "acted stupidly" in arresting the 59-year-old Gates. Obama and then-Vice President Joe Biden eventually extended an invitation to Gates and the Cambridge officer who was involved to share a beer with them at the White House, which they accepted.

== Personal life ==
Gates married Sharon Lynn Adams in 1979. They had two daughters together, before divorcing in 1999. As of 2021, Gates is married to historian Dr. Marial Iglesias Utset.

In 1974, Gates learned Transcendental Meditation. He reported:

"I had this spiritual event where it was like the top of my head opened up. And I was just overwhelmed with emotion. And tears just streamed down my face. And I was exhilarated. It was astonishing. So I know that moment of transcendence is real."

Gates is a distant relative of the actor John Lithgow.

== Awards and honors ==
- Gates has received numerous honorary degrees, including a Doctor of Letters from his alma mater, the University of Cambridge.
- Gates was named a MacArthur Fellow in 1981.
- On April 19, 1989, Gates was elected a member of the American Antiquarian Society.
- In 1989, Gates won an Anisfield-Wolf Book Award for editing the 30 volumes of "The Schomburg Library of Nineteenth-Century Black Women Writers".
- In 1993, Gates was elected to the American Academy of Arts and Sciences.
- In 1995, Gates received the Golden Plate Award of the American Academy of Achievement presented by Awards Council member Quincy Jones.
- Gates was elected to the American Philosophical Society in 1995.
- Gates was listed in Time among its "25 Most Influential Americans" in 1997.
- Ebony magazine listed Gates among its "100 Most Influential Black Americans" in 2005, and in 2009, included him on Ebony's "Power 150" list, as well as on its 2012 Power 100 list of the most influential African Americans.
- In 2002, the National Endowment for the Humanities selected Gates for the Jefferson Lecture, the U.S. federal government's highest honor for achievement in the humanities. His lecture was entitled "Mister Jefferson and the Trials of Phillis Wheatley". It was the basis of his later book The Trials of Phillis Wheatley: America's First Black Poet and Her Encounters with the Founding Fathers (2003).
- Gates received the National Humanities Medal in 1998.
- Gates was elected to the American Academy of Arts and Letters in 1999.
- Gates received the 2008 Ralph Lowell Award from the Corporation for Public Broadcasting, the highest honor in the field of public television.
- On October 23, 2006, Gates was appointed the Alphonse Fletcher Jr. University Professor at Harvard University.
- In January 2008, Gates co-founded The Root, a website dedicated to African-American perspectives, published by The Washington Post Company.
- Gates serves as the chair for the Selection Committee for the Alphonse Fletcher Sr. Fellowship Program that is sponsored by the Fletcher Foundation, the philanthropic arm of Fletcher Asset Management.
- He is on the boards of many notable institutions, including the New York Public Library; American Repertory Theater; Jazz at Lincoln Center; the Aspen Institute; the Brookings Institution; the Studio Museum of Harlem; the NAACP Legal Defense and Educational Fund; HEAF (the Harlem Educational Activities Fund); and the Center for Advanced Study in the Behavioral Sciences, located in Stanford, California.
- Gates is a member of the Council on Foreign Relations.
- In 2006, Gates was inducted into the Sons of the American Revolution after tracing his lineage to John Redman, a free African American who fought in the Revolutionary War.
- In 2010, Gates became the first African American to have his genome fully sequenced. He is also half of the first father-son pair to have their genomes fully sequenced. Knome performed the analysis as part of the Faces of America project.
- Gates's six-part PBS documentary series, The African Americans: Many Rivers to Cross, which he wrote, executive-produced, and hosted, earned the 2013 Peabody Award and an NAACP Image Award.
- In December 2014, Gates was announced as one of 14 recipients of a 2015 Alfred I. duPont–Columbia University Award for his documentary series The African Americans: Many Rivers to Cross.
- In 2019, Gates received the Anne Izard Storytellers' Choice Award, 2019 – for "The Annotated African American Folktales," which he edited with Maria Tatar.
- In 2020, Gates received an Alfred I. duPont–Columbia University Award for his PBS documentary series, Reconstruction: America after the Civil War.
- Gates was awarded the 2019 Chicago Tribune Literary Award, an annual recognition for lifetime achievement (past recipients including Salman Rushdie, Elie Wiesel, Margaret Atwood, Tom Wolfe, and Joyce Carol Oates).
- In 2020, Gates received the 400 Years of African American History Commission's Distinguished 400 Award.
- In 2020, Gates was honored with the Louis Stokes Community Visionary Award.
- In 2020, Gates received the Muhammad Ali Voice of Humanity Award.
- In 2020, Gates was named a Walter Channing Cabot Fellow by Harvard University.
- In 2020, Gates earned an NAACP Image Award Nomination for Outstanding Literary Work – Nonfiction – for his book Stony the Road: Reconstruction, White Supremacy, and the Rise of Jim Crow. The book was also named one of The New York Times' "100 Notable Books of 2019" and one of Time Magazine's "100 Must-Read Books of 2019".
- In 2021, Gates was the recipient of the Association for the Study of African American Life and History's (ASALH) Inaugural Luminary Award.
- In 2021, the National World War Two Museum in New Orleans recognized Gates with its American Spirit Award.
- In 2021, Gates was honored by PEN America with its Audible Literary Service Award.
- In 2021, Gates was named a Corresponding Fellow of the British Academy and elected to the Johnsonsians (Society).
- In 2021, Gates received the PBS Beacon Award.
- In 2021, Gates received the MIPAD 100 Network's Most Influential People of African Descent Lifetime Achievement Award.
- In 2021, the Historical Society of Pennsylvania honored Gates with its Founders Award.
- In 2021, Gates became the seventh recipient of the American Academy of Arts and Sciences Don M. Randel Award for Humanistic Studies.
- In 2021, Gates received the Gold Honor Medal, for "distinguished service to society and humanity", from The National Institute of Social Sciences.
- In 2022, the Boston Public Library honored Gates with its Literary Lights Award.
- Gates's web series, "Black History in Two Minutes (Or So)", which he executive produces with Robert F. Smith and Dyllan McGee, earned five Webby Awards, including for Best Podcast: Documentary and Best Video Series: Education & Discovery (2020), Best Podcast: Documentary and Best Social Video: Discovery & Education (2021) and Best Social Video: Discovery & Education (2022).
- In 2023, artist Kerry James Marshall donated his portrait of Gates to the Fitzwilliam Museum at the University of Cambridge.
- In 2024, Gates was awarded the prestigious Barry Prize for Distinguished Intellectual Achievement by the American Academy of Sciences and Letters.
- In 2025, Gates was awarded the Vilcek Prize for Excellence in Literary Scholarship.
- In 2026, Gates will receive an honorary degree from the University of Oxford in their annual Encaenia ceremony.

== Bibliography ==
=== Authored books ===
External videos
- Booknotes interview with Gates on Colored People: A Memoir, October 9, 1994, C-SPAN
- Presentation by Gates and Cornel West on The Future of the Race, April 4, 1996, C-SPAN
- Presentation by Gates on Life Upon These Shores, December 13, 2011, C-SPAN
- Interview with Gates on The Black Church, June 2, 2021, C-SPAN

- Figures in Black: Words, Signs, and the "Racial" Self. New York: Oxford University Press. 1987. ISBN 0-19-503564-X.
- The Signifying Monkey. New York: Oxford University Press. 1988. ISBN 0-19-503463-5. American Book Award
- Loose Canons: Notes on the Culture Wars. New York: Oxford University Press. 1992. ISBN 0-19-507519-6.
- Colored People: A Memoir. New York: Alfred A. Knopf. 1994. ISBN 0-679-42179-3.
- With Cornel West, The Future of the Race, New York: Alfred A. Knopf, 1996. ISBN 0-679-44405-X
- Thirteen Ways of Looking at a Black Man. New York: Random House. 1997. ISBN 0-679-45713-5.
- Wonders of the African World. New York: Alfred A. Knopf. 1999. ISBN 0-375-40235-7.
- The African American Century: How Black Americans Have Shaped Our Century. New York: Free Press. 2000. ISBN 0-684-86414-2.
- The Trials of Phillis Wheatley: America's first Black poet and her encounters with the founding fathers. New York: Basic Civitas Books. 2003. ISBN 0-465-02729-6.
- Finding Oprah's Roots: Finding Your Own. New York: Crown. 2007. ISBN 978-0-307-38238-2.
- In Search of Our Roots: How 19 Extraordinary African Americans Reclaimed Their Past. Crown. 2009. ISBN 978-0-307-38240-5.
- Faces of America: How 12 Extraordinary Americans Reclaimed Their Pasts. New York University Press. 2010. ISBN 978-0-8147-3264-9.
- Tradition and the Black Atlantic: Critical Theory in the African Diaspora. Basic Civitas Books. 2010. ISBN 978-0-465-01410-1.
- Black in Latin America. New York University Press. 2011. ISBN 978-0-8147-3298-4.
- Life Upon These Shores: Looking at African American History, 1513–2008. Knopf Doubleday Publishing Group. 2011. ISBN 978-0-307-59342-9.
- The Henry Louis Gates Jr. Reader. Basic Civitas Books. 2012. ISBN 978-0465028313.
- With Donald Yacovone, The African Americans: Many Rivers to Cross, SmileyBooks, 2013. ISBN 978-1401935146
- Finding Your Roots: The Official Companion to the PBS Series. University of North Carolina Press. 2014. ISBN 978-0465028313.
- With Kevin M. Burke, And Still I Rise: Black America Since MLK. New York: Ecco. 2015. ISBN 9780062427007.
- 100 Amazing Facts About the Negro. New York: Pantheon. 2017. ISBN 9780307908711.
- With Tonya Bolden, Dark Sky Rising: Reconstruction and the Dawn of Jim Crow. Scholastic Nonfiction. 2019. ISBN 978-1338262049.
- Stony the Road: Reconstruction, White Supremacy, and the Rise of Jim Crow. Penguin Press. 2019. ISBN 978-0525559535.
- The Black Church: This Is Our Story, This Is Our Song. Penguin Press. 2021. ISBN 978-1984880338.
- The Black Box: Writing the Race. Penguin Press. 2024. ISBN 978-0593299784.

=== Edited books ===
External videos
- Panel discussion on The Norton Anthology of African-American Literature, December 29, 1996, C-SPAN
- Presentation by Gates on Africana: The Encyclopedia of the African and African-American Experience, November 17, 1999, C-SPAN
- Presentation by Gates on Africana, October 18, 2006, C-SPAN
- Presentation by Gates and Evelyn Brooks Higginbotham on African American Lives, May 3, 2004, C-SPAN
- Presentation by Gates and Evelyn Brooks Higginbotham on African American National Biography, February 14, 2008, C-SPAN
- Discussion between Gates and Walter Isaacson on Lincoln on Race and Slavery and In Search of Our Roots, February 10, 2009, C-SPAN
- After Words interview with Andrew Curran on Who's Black and Why, February 16, 2024, C-SPAN

- Reading Black, Reading Feminist: A Critical Anthology, Penguin Publishing Group, 1990, ISBN 9780452010451
- With Nellie Y. McKay, The Norton Anthology of African American Literature. W. W. Norton, 1996. ISBN 0-393-04001-1
- With Kwame Anthony Appiah, The Dictionary of Global Culture. Vintage, 1998. ISBN 978-0-679-72985-3
- Africana: The Encyclopedia of the African and African American Experience. New York: Basic Civitas Books. 1999. ISBN 0-465-00071-1.
- With Kwame Anthony Appiah, Microsoft Encarta Africana Comprehensive Encyclopedia of Black History and Culture. Redmond, WA: Microsoft Corp. 1999. ISBN 0-7356-0057-0. (CD-ROM)
- Hannah Crafts, The Bondwoman's Narrative. New York: Warner Books, 2002. ISBN 0-446-69029-5
- With Hollis Robbins, In Search of Hannah Crafts: Essays in the Bondwoman's Narrative. New York: Basic/Civitas. 2004. ISBN 0-465-02714-8
- With Hollis Robbins, The Annotated Uncle Tom's Cabin . New York: W. W. Norton, 2006. ISBN 978-0-393-05946-5
- The African American National Biography. New York: Oxford University Press. 2008. ISBN 978-0-19-516019-2.
- With Donald Yacovone, Lincoln on Race and Slavery. Princeton, NJ: Princeton University Press, 2009. ISBN 978-0-691-14234-0
- With Kwame Anthony Appiah, Encyclopedia of Africa: Two-Volume Set. Oxford University Press, 2010. ISBN 0-19-533770-0
- With Maria Tatar, The Annotated African American Folktales, (Liveright-W.W. Norton, 2017), ISBN 0871407531
- With Hollis Robbins, The Penguin Portable Nineteenth Century African American Women Writers (Penguin, 2017) ISBN 9780143105992
- With Andrew S. Curran, Who's Black and Why: A Hidden Chapter from the Eighteenth-Century Invention of Race (Harvard University Press 2022) ISBN 9780674244269

=== Articles ===
- "Family matters". Personal History. The New Yorker. Vol. 84, no. 39. December 1, 2008. pp. 34–38.
- "Who's Afraid of Black History?", an op-ed by Gates on February 18, 2023, in The New York Times

=== Critical studies and reviews of Gates's work ===
Loose canons

Bérubé, Michael (Spring 1994). "Beneath the return to the valley of the culture wars". Contemporary Literature. 35 (1): 212–227. doi:10.2307/1208745. JSTOR 1208745.

== Filmography ==
- From Great Zimbabwe to Kilimatinde (narrator and screenwriter), Great Railway Journeys, BBC/PBS, 1996
- The Two Nations of Black America (host and scriptwriter), Frontline, WGBH-TV, February 10, 1998
- Leaving Cleaver: Henry Louis Gates, Jr. Remembers Eldridge Cleaver, WGBH, 1999
- Wonders of the African World (screenwriter and narrator), BBC/PBS, October 25–27, 1999 (six-part series)
  - Shown as Into Africa on BBC-2 in the United Kingdom and South Africa, Summer 1999
- Credited for his involvement in Unchained Memories (2003)
- America Beyond the Color Line (host and scriptwriter), BBC2/PBS, February 2/4, 2004 (four-part series)
- African American Lives (screenwriter, host and narrator), PBS, February 1/8, 2006 (four-hour series)
- Oprah's Roots: An African American Lives Special (screenwriter, narrator, and co-producer), PBS, January 24, 2007
- African American Lives 2 (host and narrator), PBS, February 6/13, 2008 (four-hour series)
- Looking for Lincoln (screenwriter, host/narrator, and co-producer), PBS, February 11, 2009
- Faces of America (screenwriter, narrator, and co-producer), PBS, February 10 – March 3, 2010 (four-hour series)
- Black in Latin America (executive producer, writer, and presenter), PBS, April 19 – May 10, 2011
- Finding Your Roots with Henry Louis Gates, Jr. (executive-producer, screenwriter, and host-narrator), PBS, March 2012–present
- The African Americans: Many Rivers to Cross (executive-producer, writer, and host), PBS, October–November 2013 (six-part series)
- Black America Since MLK: And Still I Rise (writer, presenter, and narrator), PBS, November 15, 2016 (four-part series)
- Africa's Great Civilizations (executive producer, writer, and presenter), PBS, February–March 2017 (six-part series)
- Reconstruction: America After the Civil War (executive producer and presenter), PBS, April 9/16, 2019 (four-hour series)
- Watchmen (actor), HBO, October 2019 (television series)
  - Cameo as a digital presentation of a fictional version of himself as Secretary of the Treasury of an alternate United States
- Making Black America: Through the Grapevine (host and writer), PBS, October 2022 (four-part series)
- The Simpsons as the voice of himself in "Carl Carlson Rides Again" (aired on February 26, 2023)
- Great Migrations: A People on the Move (host), PBS, January 28–February 18, 2025 (four-part series)
- Black and Jewish America: An Interwoven History (host and writer), PBS, February 2026 (four-part series)

== See also ==
- Reconstruction era
