= 1858 in literature =

This article contains information about the literary events and publications of 1858.

== Events ==
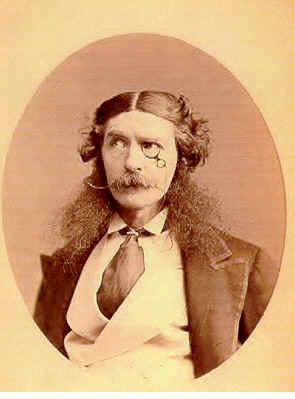
Edward Sothern as Lord Dundreary

- January 3 – The English critic John Ruskin first meets at her London home 10-year-old Rose La Touche, who becomes his muse.
- April 29 – Charles Dickens embarks on his first professional tour giving readings from his works. This will involve 129 appearances in 49 towns throughout the British Isles.
- May 15 – The third Royal Opera House in Covent Garden, London, designed by Edward Middleton Barry, opens, having been rebuilt after its second destruction by fire in 1856.
- June 18 – Henrik Ibsen marries Suzannah Thoresen, in the same year that he becomes creative director of Oslo's National Theater.
- September – Charles Baudelaire's study on Théophile Gautier is published in Revue contemporaine.
- October 15 – The farce Our American Cousin by the English playwright Tom Taylor is first performed at Laura Keene's Theatre in New York City, with the American Joe Jefferson in the title rôle and the English actor Edward Askew Sothern as Lord Dundreary.
- unknown date – Khachatur Abovian's historical novel Wounds of Armenia: Lamentation of a Patriot (Վերք Հայաստանի. ողբ հայրենասերի, Verk Hayastani), written in the Yerevan dialect in 1841, appears in Tiflis a decade after the author's presumed death; it is seen as the first Armenian novel and the first modern Eastern Armenian literary work.

== New books ==
=== Fiction ===
- William Harrison Ainsworth – The Life and Adventures of Mervyn Clitheroe
- Élie Berthet – La Bête du Gévaudan
- Bjørnstjerne Bjørnson – Arne
- Robert Barnabas Brough – The Life of Sir John Falstaff (novel)
- Edward Bulwer-Lytton – What Will He Do With It?
- George Eliot – Scenes of Clerical Life (January; first published in Blackwood's Edinburgh Magazine the previous year as three short stories)
- Octave Feuillet – Le Roman d'un jeune homme pauvre (Novel of a poor young man)
- Paul Féval – Le Bossu (The hunchback)
- Ernest-Aimé Feydeau – Fanny
- Elizabeth Gaskell – My Lady Ludlow
- Ivan Goncharov – Frigate "Pallada" («Фрегат "Паллада"»)
- Catherine Gore – Heckington
- Bernardo Guimarães – Inspirações da Tarde
- Louise de Broglie, Countess d'Haussonville – Robert Emuret
- George MacDonald – Phantastes: A Faerie Romance for Men and Women
- Abraham Mapu – Ayit Tzavua (Hypocrite Eagle)
- Aleksey Pisemsky
  - Boyarschina
  - One Thousand Souls
- Thomas Mayne Reid – Oceola
- John Hovey Robinson – Nick Whiffles or The Trapper Guide. A Tale of the North West
- Catharine Maria Sedgwick – Memoir of Joseph Curtis
- Anthony Trollope – Doctor Thorne

=== Children and young people ===
- Frederic Farrar – Eric, or, Little by Little
- Annie Keary – The Rival Kings
- Countess of Ségur – Sophie's Misfortunes (Les Malheurs de Sophie)
- Charlotte Mary Yonge – The Christmas Mummers and other stories

=== Drama ===
- Dion Boucicault – Jessie Brown; or the Relief of Lucknow (premiers on Feb.22)
- William Wells Brown – The Escape; or, A Leap for Freedom
- Thomas Holley Chivers – The Sons of Usna: a Tragic Apotheosis in Five Acts (published)
- Eugène Labiche – L'Avare en gants jaunes
- John Oxenford – Porter's Knot
- Tom Taylor – Our American Cousin

=== Poetry ===
- Matthew Arnold – Merope
- Alphonse Daudet – Les Amoureuses
- Henry Wadsworth Longfellow – The Courtship of Miles Standish
- William Morris – The Defence of Guinevere, and other Poems

=== Non-fiction ===
- John Brown – Horas Subsecivae (Leisure Hours, three volumes)
- Gray's Anatomy, 1st edition
- William Carew Hazlitt – The History of the Origin and Rise of the Republic of Venice
- Oliver Wendell Holmes Sr. – The Autocrat of the Breakfast-Table
- William H. Prescott – History of Philip II, volume 3
- Charles Piazzi Smyth – Teneriffe: An Astronomer's Experiment (illustrated by stereoscopic photographs)
- Dimitrie Ralet – Suvenire și impresii de călătorie în România, Bulgaria, Constantinopole (Souvenirs and Impressions of Travels in Romania, Bulgaria, Constantinople)
- Alfred Russel Wallace – On the Tendency of Varieties to Depart Indefinitely From the Original Type

== Births ==
- January 11 – Anna Braden, American author, editor, elocutionist (died 1939)
- January 21 – Anna Bowman Dodd, American author (died 1929)
- January 22 – Beatrice Webb (Beatrice Potter), English political writer (died 1943)
- January 24 – Constance Naden, English poet and philosopher (died 1889)
- January 27 – Neel Doff, Dutch-born French author (died 1942)
- February 19 – Charles Alexander Eastman, Native American author, physician, reformer, co-founder of Boy Scouts of America (died 1939)
- March 12 – Adolph Ochs, American newspaper publisher (died 1935)
- March 28 – Joséphin Péladan, French novelist (died 1918)
- April 1 – Gaetano Mosca, Italian political scientist and public servant (died 1941)
- April 15 – Émile Durkheim, French sociologist (died 1917)
- June 8 – Florence Hull Winterburn, American children's author (unknown year of death)
- June 20 – Charles W. Chesnutt, American writer (died 1932)
- June 25 – Georges Courteline, French dramatist and novelist (died 1929)
- July 1 – Velma Caldwell Melville, American editor, and writer of prose and poetry (died 1924)
- July 24 – Wolfgang Kapp, Prussian journalist (died 1922)
- August 2 – William Watson, English poet (died 1935)
- August 3 – Paul Sabatier, French religious writer (died 1928)
- August 15 – E. Nesbit, English children's author (died 1924)
- September 15 – Emma Augusta Sharkey, American writer, journalist, dime novelist (died 1902)
- October 2 – Emma A. Cranmer, American author, reformer, suffragist (died 1937)
- November 20 – Selma Lagerlöf, Swedish writer (died 1940)
- December 24 – Harriet Pritchard Arnold, American author (died 1901)
- December 26 – Owen Morgan Edwards, Welsh historian and educator (died 1920)

== Deaths ==
- January 8 – Caroline Cornwallis, English writer (born 1786)
- February 13 – Hermann Heinrich Gossen, German economist (born 1810)
- February 26 – Thomas Tooke, English economist (born 1774)
- April 22 – Robert Stephen Rintoul, Scottish journalist (born 1787)
- May 3 – Auguste Brizeux, French poet (born 1803)
- May 12 – Georg Benedikt Winer, German theologian (born 1789)
- May 17 – Frank Forester, English novelist and sports writer (born 1807)
- June 3 – Edward Moxon, English poet and publisher (born 1801)
- June 28 – Jane Marcet, English writer of introductory science books (born 1769)
- October 25 – Dimitrie Ralet, Moldavian essayist, dramatist, poet and propagandist (born c. 1816)
- November 3 – Harriet Taylor Mill, English philosopher (tuberculosis, born 1807)
- November 15 – Johanna Kinkel, German writer and composer (born 1810)
- December 18 – Thomas Holley Chivers, American poet and physician (born 1809)
