= Clotel =

Novel by William Wells Brown

Clotel; or, the President's Daughter
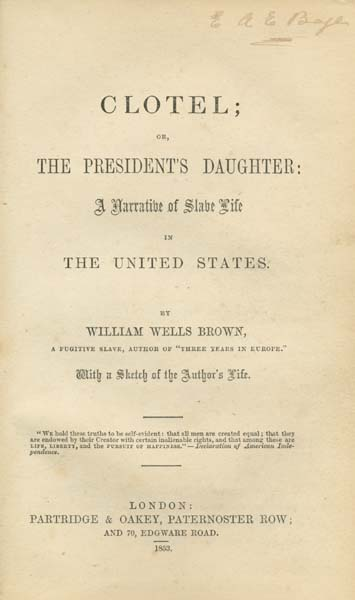
- Title page, first edition
- Author: William Wells Brown
- Language: English
- Genre: Novel
- Publisher: Partridge & Oakey
- Publication date: 1853
- Publication place: United Kingdom
- Media type: Print
- OCLC: 52765888
- Dewey Decimal: 813/.4 22
- LC Class: PS1139.B9 C53 2004
- Text: Clotel; or, the President's Daughter at Project Gutenberg

Clotel; or, The President's Daughter: A Narrative of Slave Life in the United States is an 1853 novel by United States author and playwright William Wells Brown about Clotel and her sister, fictional slave daughters of Thomas Jefferson. Brown, who escaped from slavery in 1834 at the age of 20, published the book in London. He was staying after a lecture tour to evade possible recapture due to the 1850 Fugitive Slave Act. Set in the early nineteenth century, it is considered the first novel published by an African American and is set in the United States. Three additional versions were published through 1867.

The novel explores slavery's destructive effects on African-American families, the difficult lives of American mulattoes or mixed-race people, and the "degraded and immoral condition of the relation of master and slave in the United States of America." Featuring an enslaved mixed-race woman named Currer and her daughters Althesa and Clotel, fathered by Thomas Jefferson, it is considered a tragic mulatto story. The women's relatively comfortable lives end after Jefferson's death. They confront many hardships, with the women taking heroic action to preserve their families.

== Background ==
The novel played with known 19th-century reports that Thomas Jefferson had an intimate relationship with his slave Sally Hemings and fathered several children with her. Of mixed race and described as nearly white, she was believed to be the half sister of Jefferson's wife, Martha Wayles Skelton Jefferson, the youngest of six children by her father John Wayles with his slave Betty Hemings. Members of the large Hemings family were among more than 100 slaves inherited by Martha and Thomas Jefferson after her father's death. Martha died when Jefferson was 40 and he never remarried.

Although Jefferson never responded to the rumors, some historians believe that his freeing of the four Hemings children as they came of age is significant: he may have let Beverly (a male) and certainly let his sister Harriet Hemings "escape" in 1822 from Monticello, and freed two by his will in 1826, although he was heavily in debt. His daughter gave Hemings "her time" (meaning that she freed her), so she may have been able to live freely in Charlottesville with her two youngest sons, Madison and Eston Hemings, for the rest of her life. Except for three other Hemings men whom Jefferson freed in his will, the rest of his 130 slaves were sold in 1827. A 1998 DNA study confirmed a match between the Jefferson male line and Eston Hemings' direct male descendant. Based on this and the body of historic evidence, most Jeffersonian scholars have come to accept that Jefferson did father Hemings's children over an extended period of time.

As an escaped slave, due to the Fugitive Slave Act of 1850, William Wells Brown was at risk in the United States. While in England on a lecture tour in 1849, he decided to stay there with his two daughters after the Fugitive Slave Act was passed in 1850, as he was at risk of being taken by slave catchers. He published Clotel in 1853 in London; it was the first novel published by an African American. In 1854 a British couple purchased freedom for Brown, and he returned with his daughters to the US.

== Plot summary ==
This, reader, is an unvarnished narrative of one doomed by the laws of the Southern States to be a slave. It tells not only its own story of grief, but speaks of a thousand wrongs and woes beside, which never see the light; all the more bitter and dreadful, because no help can relieve, no sympathy can mitigate, and no hope can cheer.

— —Narrator of Clotel, Page 199.

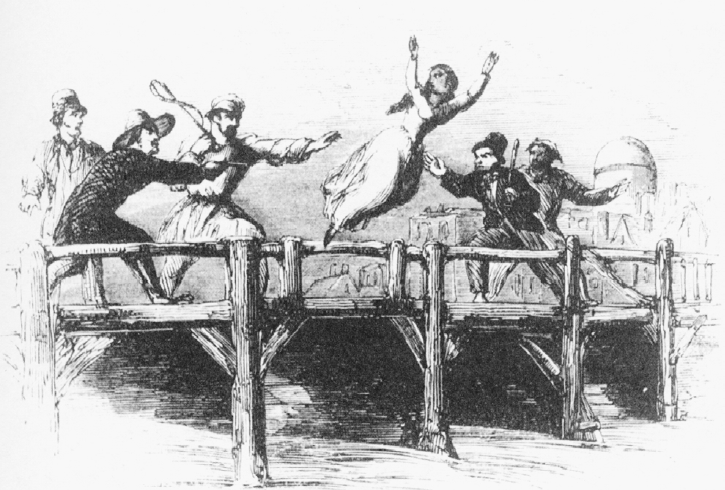
Frontispiece to the 1853 publication, engraving entitled: THE DEATH OF CLOTEL.

The narrative of Clotel plays with history by relating the "perilous antebellum adventures" of a young mixed-race slave Currer and her two light-skinned daughters fathered by Thomas Jefferson. Because the mother is a slave, according to partus sequitur ventrem, which Virginia adopted into law in 1662, her daughters are born into slavery. The book includes "several sub-plots" related to other slaves, religion and anti-slavery. Currer, described as "a bright mulatto" (meaning light-skinned) gives birth to two "near white" daughters: Clotel and Althesa.

After the death of Jefferson, Currer and her daughters are sold as slaves. Horatio Green, a white man, purchases Clotel and takes her as a common-law wife. They cannot legally marry under state laws against miscegenation.

Her mother Currer and sister Althesa remain "in a slave gang." Currer is eventually purchased by Mr. Peck, a preacher. She is enslaved until she dies from yellow fever, shortly before Peck's daughter was preparing to emancipate her.

Althesa marries her white master, Henry Morton, a Northerner, by passing as a white woman. They have daughters Jane and Ellen, who are educated. Although supporting abolition, Morton fails to manumit Althesa and their daughters. After Althesa and Morton both die, their daughters are enslaved. Ellen commits suicide to escape sexual enslavement, and Jane dies in slavery from heartbreak.

Green and Clotel have a daughter Mary, also mixed race of course, and majority white. When Green becomes ambitious and involved in local politics, he abandons his relationship with Clotel and Mary. He marries "a white woman who forces him to sell Clotel and enslave his child."

Clotel is sold to a planter in Vicksburg, Mississippi. There she meets William, another slave, and they plan a bold escape. Dressing as a white man, Clotel is accompanied by William acting as her slave; they travel and gain freedom by reaching the free state of Ohio. (This is based on the tactics of the 1849 escape by Ellen Craft and William Craft). William continues his flight to Canada (an estimated 30,000 fugitive slaves reached there by 1852). Clotel returns to Virginia to try to free her daughter Mary. After being captured in Richmond, Clotel is taken to Washington, DC for sale at its slave market. She escapes and is pursued through the city by slave catchers. Surrounded by them on the Long Bridge, she commits suicide by jumping to her death in the Potomac River.

Thus died Clotel, the daughter of Thomas Jefferson, a president of the United States.

— —Narrator of Clotel, Page 182

Mary is forced to work as a domestic slave for her father Horatio Green and his white wife. She arranges to trade places in prison with her lover, the slave George. He escapes to Canada. Sold to a slave trader, Mary is purchased by a French man who takes her to Europe. Ten years later, after the Frenchman's death, George and Mary reunite by chance in Dunkirk, France. The novel ends with their marriage.

== Primary characters ==
- Currer – Semi-autonomous slave of Thomas Jefferson; mother of Clotel and Althesa. Currer is "Sally Hemings fictional counterpart." Instead of serving Jefferson directly, she works as a laundress, giving him her pay. She exchanges her income for a "pseudo-freedom" for her and her daughters, and gets them educated. She is purchased by Rev. Peck.
- Clotel – Daughter of Currer and Jefferson; sister to Althesa. At 16 years old, she is purchased by Horatio Green, with whom she has a daughter Mary. Later she is sold again, ending up in Vicksburg, Mississippi. She escapes from there with the slave William, while disguised and traveling as a white gentleman, Mr. Johnson.
- Althesa – Daughter of Currer and Jefferson; sister to Clotel. Purchased at 14 years old by James Crawford and resold to Dr. Morton. She passes as white so they can be married; they have two daughters, Jane and Ellen, and her life looks hopeful.
- Mary – Daughter of Clotel and Horatio Green. She becomes the lover of the slave George Green, jailed as an insurgent after Nat Turner's Rebellion in 1831. She switches places with him in prison, allowing him to escape dressed as a woman. She is eventually sold to a French man who takes her to Europe. After his death, she encounters George by chance, and they marry.
- George Green – Slave in the service of Horatio Green; becomes Mary's lover. After escaping prison with her help, he flees to the free states, evading recapture in Ohio with the help of a Quaker. He reaches Canada and migrates to Great Britain. Ten years after arriving in England, he travels to Dunkirk, France, where he re-encounters Mary, and they marry.
- Horatio Green – He is the first to buy Clotel after Jefferson's death, and takes her as a concubine. He is Mary's biological father. He sells Clotel and enslaves Mary after marrying a white woman.
- Georgiana Peck – Daughter of Reverend Peck.
- Reverend Peck – Father of Georgiana Peck. He buys Currer, assigning her to kitchen and household affairs.
- William – An enslaved mechanic who is hired out to work alongside Clotel in Vicksburg. While paying his master from his earnings, he saved $150 in secret. He and Clotel use this to support their bold escape.

== Critical reception ==
The novel has been extensively studied in the late 20th and early 21st century. Kirkpatrick writes that Clotel demonstrates the "pervasive, recurring victimization of black women under slavery. Even individuals of mixed-race status who attempt to pass as white nevertheless suffer horrifically." It exposes "the insidious intersection of economic gain and political ambition—represented by founding fathers such as Jefferson and Horatio Green." It is a "scathing, sarcastic, comprehensive critique of slavery in the American South, race prejudice in the American North, and religious hypocrisy in the American nation as a whole." The novel and the title "walk a precarious line between oral history, written history, and artistic license." Mitchell said that Brown emphasized romantic conventions, dramatic incident and a political view in his novel.

Recent scholars have also analyzed Clotel for its representations of gender and race. Sherrard-Johnson notes that Brown portrayed both the "tragic central characters " and the "heroic figures" as mulattoes with Angloid features, similar to his own appearance. She thinks he uses the cases of "nearly white" slaves to gain sympathy for his characters. She notes that he borrowed elements from the abolitionist Lydia Maria Child's plot in her short story, "The Quadroons" (1842). He also incorporated notable elements of recent events, such as the escape of the Crafts, and the freedom suit court case of Salome, an enslaved woman in Louisiana who claimed to be an immigrant born in Germany.

Martha Cutter notes that Brown portrayed his women characters generally as passive victims of slavery and as representations of True Women and the cult of domesticity, which were emphasized at the time for women. They are not portrayed as wanting or seeking freedom, but as existing through love and suffering. Cutter asks, if Mary could free George, why did she not free herself? Although Brown published three later versions of Clotel, he did not seriously change this characterization of the African-American women. Slave women such as Ellen Craft were known to have escaped slavery, but Brown did not portray such women fully achieving freedom.

Mitchell, in contrast, believes that Brown portrays his women as acting heroically: she notes that Clotel escapes and goes back to Virginia to rescue her daughter, and more than one escape is described. She thinks he emphasizes adventure for the sake of character development. Even after heroic action, Brown's women are subject to the suffering of slavery. He emphasizes its evil of illegitimacy, and the arbitrary breakup of families.

== Influence ==
In addition to being the first novel published by an African American, Clotel became a model that influenced many other nineteenth-century African-American writers. It is the first instance of an African-American writer "to dramatize the underlying hypocrisy of democratic principles in the face of African American slavery."

Through Clotel, Brown introduces into African-American literature the "tragic mulatto" character. Such characters, representing the historical reality of hundreds of thousands of mixed-race people, many of them slaves, were further developed by "Webb, Wilson, Chesnutt, Johnson, and other novelists", writing primarily after the American Civil War.

The recovery of the life of Sally Hemings and the story of Clotel, written by Brown, are symbiotic dynamisms. The book Clotel helped to keep alive the idea that Jefferson fathered children with an enslaved concubine. W. Edward Farrison dug into the factual aspects of Jefferson's life. Farrison recovered the news articles of James Callender which had been overlooked since 1802. Farrison was the first scholar to dig into Jefferson's Farm Book for answers about the Hemings family. The Farm Book was first printed for public distribution in 1953. Another resource was the 1951 publication of Memoirs of a Monticello Slave. Farrison published the Origins of Brown's Clotel in 1954. Farrison helped Pearl M. Graham with her groundbreaking 1961 article, titled Thomas Jefferson and Sally Hemings, published in the Journal of Negro History. Farrison published his Brown biography in 1969. As the Jefferson-Hemings liaison grew in stature, interest in the Clotel novel grew as well.

== Style ==
According to Brown in its preface, he wrote Clotel as a polemic narrative against slavery, written for a British audience:

If the incidents set forth in the following pages should add anything new to the information already given to the Public through similar publications, and should thereby aid in bringing British influence to bear upon American slavery, the main object for which this work was written will have been accomplished.

— —Preface, Page 47

It is also considered a propagandistic narrative, in that Brown leveraged "sentimentality, melodrama, contrived plots, [and] newspaper articles" as devices "to damage the 'peculiar institution' of slavery."

Chapters predominantly open "with an epigraph underscoring the romance’s urgent message: 'chattel slavery in America undermines the entire social condition of man.'"

Clotel is told through the use of a "third-person limited omniscient narrator." The narrator is "morally didactic and consistently ironic." The narrative is fragmented, in that it "combines fact, fiction, and external literary sources." It presents the reader with a structure that is episodic and is informed by "legends, myths, music, and concrete eye-witness accounts of the fugitive slaves themselves." It also "draws on antislavery lectures and techniques," such as "abolitionist verse and fiction, newspaper stories and ads, legislative reports, public addresses, private letters, and personal anecdotes."

== See also ==
- List of African American firsts
- The Black Vampyre

== Sources ==
- Bell, Bernard. The Afro-American Novel and Its Tradition. Amherst: University of Massachusetts Press, 1987.
- Brown, William Wells. Clotel; or, The President's Daughter: A Narrative of Slave Life in the United States. 1853. Ed. Robert Levine. Boston: Bedford, 2000.
- Castronovo, Russ. "National Narrative and National History." A Companion to American Fiction, 1780–1865. Ed. by Shirley Samuels. Malden, MA: Blackwell Publishing, 2004. 434–444.
- Cutter, Martha. Unruly Tongue: Identity and Voice in American Women's Writing, 1850–1930. Jackson, MS: University Press of Mississippi, 1999.
- Drew, Benjamin. "Preface", A North-Side View of Slavery. The Refugee: or the Narratives of Fugitive Slaves in Canada, Boston: Jon P. Jewett and Company, 1856
- duCille, Ann. "Where in the World Is William Wells Brown? Thomas Jefferson, Sally Hemings, and the DNA of African-American Literary History", American Literary History 12.3 (Autumn, 2000). 443–462. JSTOR.
- Fabi, M. Giulia. Passing and the Rise of the African American Novel. Chicago: University of Illinois Press, 2001.
- Farrison, W. Edward, "The Origin of Brown's Clotel," Phylon, 1954.
- Farrison, W. Edward, William Wells Brown, Author and Reformer, (Chicago, Univ. of Chicago Press, 1969)
- Gabler-Hover, Janet. "'Clotel'," American History Through Literature, 1820–1870. New York: Charles Scribner's Sons, 2005. 248–253.
- Kirkpatrick, Mary Alice. "William Wells Brown and Summary of 'Clotel'," 2004, Documenting the American South, University of North Carolina, accessed 7 May 2011.
- Mitchell, Angelyn. "Her Side of His Story: A Feminist Analysis of Two Nineteenth-Century Antebellum Novels—William Wells Brown’s Clotel and Harriet E. Wilson’s Our Nig", American Literary Realism 24.3 (April 1992). 7–21, at JSTOR.
- Sherrard-Johnson, Cherene. "Delicate Boundaries: Passing and Other 'Crossings' in Fictionalized Slave Narratives." A Companion to American Fiction, 1780–1865. Edited by Shirley Samuels, Malden, MA: Blackwell Publishing, 2004. 204–215.
