= Jonathan Senchyne =

American academic

- Awards: National Endowment for the Humanities Fellow; Elected member of the American Antiquarian Society.

Academic background
- Education: Ph.D. Cornell University; M.A. Syracuse University; B.A. SUNY Geneseo
- Doctoral advisor: Shirley Samuels
- Website: ischool.wisc.edu/staff/senchyne-jonathan/

Jonathan Senchyne is an American academic whose work spans the study of the history of books, print culture, material culture, literary theory, and American literature. He is a professor of book history in the Information School as well as the current director of the Center for the History of Print and Digital Culture at the University of Wisconsin-Madison. He is known for his work in American literary book history and print culture studies.

== Early life and education ==
Senchyne was born in Buffalo, New York. He attended Saint Francis High School and then earned a B.A. from SUNY Geneseo. As a college student he co-founded and edited Living Forge, a little magazine that collected literature and art from the Rust Belt. Senchyne then took M.A. degrees from Syracuse University and Cornell University, before earning a Ph.D. from Cornell University under the supervision of Professor Shirley Samuels. He also studied under Hans Ulrich Gumbrecht at the School of Criticism and Theory. At Cornell he was awarded the Moses Coit Tyler Prize for best essay in American literature as well as the Martin Sampson Award for teaching in English.

== Academic career ==
Following his Ph.D. he joined the faculty of the University of Wisconsin-Madison as an assistant professor in the School of Library and Information Studies in 2012 and was later promoted to associate professor. In 2015 he was appointed director of UW-Madison's Center for the History of Print and Digital Culture. He is known for using hands-on instruction in letterpress printing in the classroom to teach historical methods and concepts surrounding the making and use of books and print.

Senchyne has held several visiting appointments including as Pine Tree Foundation Distinguished Visiting professor of the Future of the Book in a Digital Age at the CUNY Graduate Center in 2017-2018 and since 2023 as summer faculty at the California Rare Book School at UCLA.

In 2024 he was named associate editor of the Papers of the Bibliographical Society of America.

== Scholarly work ==
=== The Intimacy of Paper ===
Senchyne has written extensively about the cultural significance of papermaking from rags in the 17th through 19th centuries, arguing that widespread awareness of papermaking technology and the recycling of personal and domestic cloth created both literary and popular cultures that were fascinated with the possibility of various kinds of intimacies within paper. In The Intimacy of Paper in Early and Nineteenth-Century American Literature (2020), published by the University of Massachusetts Press, Senchyne explores how readers' knowledge about the remnants of rags of clothing, bedclothes, and other natural fabrics that had been recycled into the paper they held allowed them to "consider intriguing proximities and contacts... within the materiality of paper, books, and print." Senchyne also finds that attention to the materiality of paper appears in the writing of authors including Anne Bradstreet, Lydia Sigourney, Benjamin Franklin, Henry David Thoreau, Herman Melville, and William Wells Brown. By tracing the way rags, papermaking, and paper itself are represented in literary culture, he attempts to show how scholarship in literary book history seek to understand the meaning of a work within particular media and social contexts by attending to the close relationships between a text's linguistic and bibliographic codes.

=== George Moses Horton's "Individual Influence" manuscript ===
While researching the 19th-century bibliographer Henry Harrisse, Senchyne identified a manuscript essay written by the enslaved 19th-century African American poet George Moses Horton that had been collected by Harrisse and included in his papers. Noticing that the essay, titled "Individual Influence," had not been included in Horton's collected works or discussed by other scholars, Senchyne transcribed, contextualized, and published Horton's essay in Publications of the Modern Language Association of America, arguing that Horton may have been responding to University of North Carolina's firing of Professor Benjamin Hedrick for supporting an anti-slavery candidate.

=== On Various Subjects: 250 Years of Phillis Wheatley ===
In 2023 on the 250th anniversary of the publication of the first book of African American literature, Phillis Wheatley's Poems on Various Subjects, Religious and Moral Senchyne co-curated an exhibit, at the University of Wisconsin special collections library, of books and objects exploring Wheatley's legacy. Reviews of the exhibit noted that the items in the collection included and celebrated the first edition of Poems on Various Subjects, Religious and Moral while putting it in context with print culture featuring Wheatley from 1773 to 2023.

== Awards and honors ==
Senchyne has held multiple fellowships from the American Antiquarian Society including the Jay and Deborah Last Fellowship in American Visual Culture and the AAS-National Endowment for the Humanities Long-term Fellowship. In 2023, he was elected to membership in the AAS. He has also been a short-term research fellow at the New York Public Library archives and manuscripts division. He is a member of Phi Beta Kappa.

== Selected publications ==
- Jonathan Senchyne, The Intimacy of Paper in Early and Nineteenth-Century American Literature. Amherst, MA: University of Massachusetts Press, 2020. ISBN 1625344740
- Jonathan Senchyne and Brigitte Fielder, eds., Against a Sharp White Background: Infrastructures of African American Print. Madison: The University of Wisconsin Press, 2019. ISBN 9780299321505
- Publications indexed by GoogleScholar.
