= Josephine Brown =

American biographer

- Born: Elizabeth Josephine Brown; June 12, 1839; Detroit, Michigan
- Died: January 16, 1874 (aged 34); Cambridge, Massachusetts
- Occupations: Teacher; Anti-slavery lecturer Biographer
- Movement: Colored Conventions Movement
- Spouse(s): George S. Dougans; James Campbell
- Parent(s): William Wells Brown; Elizabeth Schooner

Elizabeth Josephine Brown (June 12, 1839 – January 16, 1874) was the daughter and biographer of escaped African-American slave William Wells Brown and his first wife Elizabeth Schooner. Josephine's account, Biography of an American Bondman, by His Daughter, was published in Boston by R. F. Wallcut in 1856. It was long believed to be the first biography written by an African-American woman, but is now known to have been predated by Susan Paul's Memoir of James Jackson, the attentive and obedient scholar (1835).

Biography of an American Bondman draws heavily on and generally parallels William Wells Brown's own account of his life, Narrative of William W. Brown, A Fugitive Slave (1847). However, Josephine was forthcoming about details of abuse and mistreatment which Wells Brown's account does not include, and openly addressed the problems of mulatto slaves. She also expands the account to include Brown's life in Europe.

== Early life ==
Josephine's father, William Wells Brown, was one of seven children born in slavery to Elizabeth, who was enslaved by Dr. John Young, near Lexington, Kentucky. Born in 1814, William was acknowledged as the son of George W. Higgins, a relative of Brown's owner. In 1834, Brown escaped to the north and settled in Cleveland, Ohio. There he married his first wife Elizabeth Schooner of Scipio Center, Seneca County, Ohio (now the town of Republic, Ohio) who was of mixed African-American and Native American ancestry.

Two daughters were born to the Browns while they lived in Cleveland. Their first daughter, born in 1835, died while still a baby. Their second daughter, Clarissa, was born in the spring of 1836. That summer, the Browns moved to Buffalo, New York. Although it has been long assumed that Elizabeth Josephine Brown, their third daughter, was born in Buffalo in 1839, on two occasions, Josephine (who went by her middle name) stated that she was born in the city of Detroit, Michigan. The Brown family were definitely back in Buffalo in time for the 1840 Federal Census. Another daughter, Henrietta Helen, was born in 1842 and died in 1844.

In 1845, the Browns moved to Farmington, New York. Wells Brown and his wife Elizabeth Schooner separated in 1847. He retained custody of his daughters, and moved to Boston. While he traveled as an abolitionist and lecturer, Clarissa and Josephine attended boarding school, living at 21 Seventh Street in New Bedford, Massachusetts. There they were pupils of well-known abolitionist, Nathan Johnson.

== European travel and education ==
In 1849, Wells Brown was invited to attend the International Peace Congress in Paris, to speak against slavery. Following passage of the Fugitive Slave Law of 1850, Brown decided to remain, lecturing and writing.

In 1851 Clarissa and Josephine briefly joined their father in London, before both girls were placed at a boarding school in Calais, France. In 1852, the girls returned to London, training at the Home and Colonial School to become teachers or governesses. During this time, Josephine may have sometimes worked with her father in support of abolition, joining him on his lecture tours and transcribing his correspondence. In December 1853, Josephine passed her qualifying examinations, and accepted a position as school mistress of the East Plumstead School in Woolwich, England.

Josephine's mother died in Buffalo in 1852. In 1854, Wells Brown's freedom was purchased from his enslaver by abolitionist supporters, and he returned to the United States. His daughters remained in England.

== Activism ==
=== Anti-slavery lecturing and writing ===
In 1855, Josephine chose to return to America, escorted on the transatlantic voyage by abolitionist Horace Greeley. She joined her father in Boston, working with him for a time as an antislavery lecturer in New England.

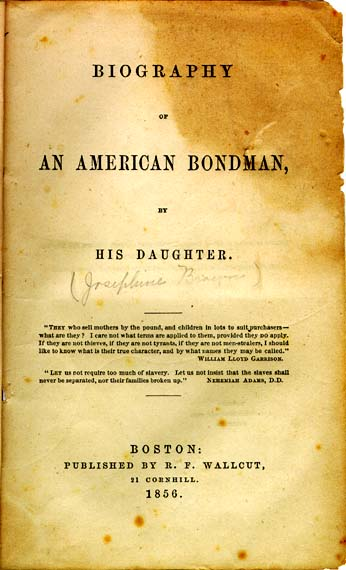
Title page of Biography of an American Bondman, by His Daughter

Concerned that his biography was no longer in print, Josephine published Biography of an American Bondman (1856) to preserve his legacy. Begun while Josephine was at school in France, her biography reworks material from Wells Brown's 1847 autobiography while adding additional detail on abuses he experienced while a slave, and the hostility that mulatto slaves experienced from both blacks and whites. Josephine also describes his travels in Great Britain.

== Later life ==
Josephine Brown is believed to have returned to England in 1856 and resumed her teaching career in England.

As "Josephine Brown Campbell", she is reported to have died in 1874 of tuberculosis and been buried in Cambridge Cemetery, Cambridge, Massachusetts.
