= A Sojourn in the City of Amalgamation =

1835 novel by Jerome B. Holgate

A Sojourn in the City of Amalgamation, in the Year of Our Lord, 19--
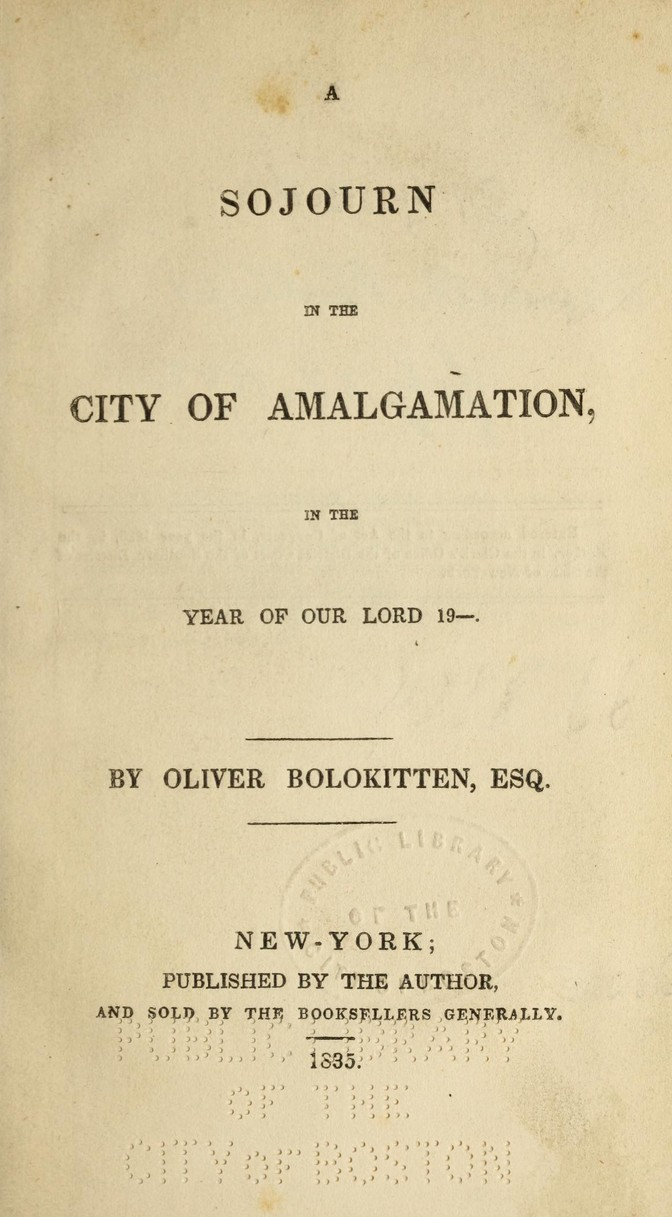
- Title page of original text
- Author: Jerome B. Holgate (as Oliver Bolokitten)
- Language: English
- Genre: Dystopian fiction, science fiction
- Publisher: Self-published
- Publication date: February 1835
- Publication place: United States
- Media type: Print
- Pages: 190
- OCLC: 4245608

A Sojourn in the City of Amalgamation, in the Year of Our Lord, 19-- is a dystopian novel written by Jerome B. Holgate under the pseudonym Oliver Bolokitten. It was self-published by the author in New York in February 1835. The novel criticizes abolitionists by describing them as endorsers of "amalgamation", or interracial marriage. The narrator encounters a future city, Amalgamation (thought to be a future Philadelphia), where white people and black people have intermarried solely for the sake of racial equality, resulting in a dystopia.

The work is one of the first uses of a satirical novel, speaking against interracial marriage and for black recolonization. Terrorism scholar J.M. Berger called it a "remarkably vituperative book", while academic David A. Bateman called it "extraordinarily racist". It is one of the earliest examples of a work of "racist dystopia", and as one of the first dystopian books generally.

== Summary ==
Bolokitten says that "everything in the world is a cause", and he links these causes to abolitionists and slavery. He sees two white men and two black women disembarking a boat and follows their group to the city of Amalgamation. Bolokitten learns from them that amalgamation is a "fashionable" thing to do in this city. The group goes to a church in which a preacher named Wildfire has sermons about the benefits of amalgamation. There are contraptions placed throughout the pews and attached to people's noses to "protect" the white members from the smell of their black spouses. After the sermon, there is an invitation for those who want to be initiated into the "holy fraternity".

Wildfire explains to the group that there are two parts to the process to join: boiling, which will get rid of the prejudice, and perfuming, which will keep it away. During the boiling process, a liquid comes out of the kettle and surrounds the votary, influencing their brains. As the boiling begins, things around the room start to move on their own, and everyone starts to dance as if forced, even the narrator. They then go into the perfuming room, and the women are bound and flogged severely. The women are injected with syringes full of perfume to further purify them, put in a coop that is covered in small holes, and fumigated in an additional boiling process. Wildfire then calls for the probosci, which is a "silver wire... attached to the metallic pilaster above [them]," and clasps the small hook on the end of the wire to Hoffle's nose before drawing the nostrils up. Bolokitten emphasizes the importance of nose hairs before saying that Mr. Dashey has none. Wildfire discovers this and becomes angry, and his tantrum reminds Bolokitten of Jim Crow. The door opens to reveal a tall man in a cloak, with a baton in one hand and a lantern in the other, who demands to know what the noise is, and Wildfire yells at them to leave "lest... [they] be plunged into the Great Boiler."

Bolokitten learns that Sternfast, a white man, has a white wife and two white children, and when Bolokitten asks why he did not amalgamate, Sternfast tells him that, to make up for his transgression, his daughter will marry a black man. Bolokitten meets a group of black men in the street one night, and shoots the leader before the rest of the group beats, robs, and kidnaps Bolokitten. He is put into a dimly lit room, and through a crack in the floor, he sees a crowd of black people surrounding Wildfire, who is seated in an armchair. One man says he will not harm his "beloved Wildfire," but he wants atonement for the fact that Wildfire freed them, saying that they are not as happy as when they were slaves because they are not provided for anymore. The leader then says to give Wildfire a new coat, and they strip him, cover him in tar, and feather him. They throw him in the cellar with Bolokitten and leave.

Bolokitten and Hoffle come across a building with the inscription: "The Zoological Boiler." They enter a room full of boilers with different animals, all violating the law to "love thy neighbor as thyself". Bolokitten, followed by Hoffle, leaves when the animals being boiled start to scream. Julia tells Albert that her father, Sternfast, wants her to marry Mr. George Cosho. Julia assures Albert that she would rather kill herself than do so, but they are soon interrupted by an infuriated Sternfast. Julia flees, but is later visited by George. The pair are joined by Albert, who breaks off his relationship with Julia and asks George to leave. Julia informs Albert of her marriage in three days, and instead urges her to accept a wedding proposal from a black man named Wyming.

Julia is approached by two black men while in town, and they introduce her to Mr. Wyming. When she tries to leave with her friend Ruth, George, along with a crowd, appears and surrounds her. A group of black men try to talk to Sternfast, but then the military appears, assuming that there is a riot. Wyming grabs Julia to protect her. The military fires just as Julia and Wyming make it to nearby cover, leaving George behind to be shot and killed. Sternfast tells Wyming that Julia owes him her hand in marriage because he saved her. He then decides to drug his daughter to get her to comply to marrying Wyming, and his wife reluctantly helps him. Wyming and Julia get married, and afterward, Wyming makes her watch him bathe. Julia does not understand why until he washes his face and she recognizes him as Albert in blackface. Julia faints from excitement. The novel ends with the happy couple reunited.

=== The Memoirs of Boge Bogun ===
Between chapters seven and eight of the novel, Bolokitten purchases a book while in the city of Amalgamation and proceeds to read it in full. The full title of this novel is The Memoirs of Boge Bogun with an Account of the War that took Place in his Own Body, Between the Differently Colored Particles of Flesh and the Consequent Result, and its narrative focuses on a mulatto man whose body, due to his racial status, is waging constant war on itself. The two factions of his body, the white and the black, fight their battles throughout the various systems of his body.

== Background and publication ==
It was self-published by Jerome B. Holgate under the pseudonym Oliver Bolokitten in New York in February 1835. Holgate was an obscure author. "Bolokitten" is probably derived from a play on Holgate's name: his middle initial, the first part of his last name, and the second part of his last name (gate becoming gato, Spanish for cat, translated into English).

== Analysis ==
Terrorism scholar J.M. Berger called it a "remarkably vituperative book", while academic David A. Bateman called it "extraordinarily racist". Berger noted it as, in his piece on The Turner Diaries, the earliest example of a work of "racist dystopia", and as one of the first dystopian books generally. He said it focused on "the physical horrors of race-mixing, including lengthy and lurid descriptions of the revulsion that future whites must suppress in order to breed with grotesquely caricatured blacks". Science fiction critic John Clute said the novel probably "seemed grotesque" in its racism even for the audience of 1835.

Amalgamation as a city is likely meant to represent a future Philadelphia. The work is one of the first uses of a satirical novel, speaking against interracial marriage and for black recolonization. Holgate's work is founded in the strong prejudices of the early 19th-century United States. The novel includes a sense of strong racial tension and a fear of miscegenation, which is representative of the time period. Holgate had strong ties to the anti-abolition movement and advocates the perspectives of the group throughout his novel. The novel's basic format is structured similarly to the satirical travel narrative, specifically Gulliver's Travels written by Jonathan Swift (which he quotes at the beginning of the novel).

== See also ==
- "The Quadroons" by Lydia Marie Child
- The Black Vampyre; A Legend of St. Domingo by Uriah Derick D'Arcy
- The Half-Breed: A Tale of the Western Frontier by Walt Whitman
- Of One Blood: Or, The Hidden Self by Pauline Hopkins
