= The Quadroons =

- Short story by Lydia Maria Child
- Country: United States
- Language: English

Publication
- Published in: Liberty Bell
- Publication date: 1842

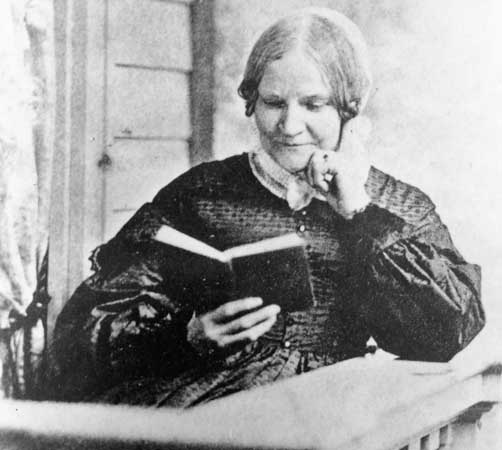
The author

"The Quadroons" is a short story written by American writer Lydia Maria Child (1802–1880) and published in The Liberty Bell in 1842. The influential short story depicts the life and death of a mixed-race woman and her daughter in early nineteenth century America, a slave-owning society.

Child originated the trope of the "tragic mulatta", which became well-known in the anti-slavery literature of the time, was taken up also by many other writers. Years later, Harriet Jacobs's autobiography Incidents in the Life of a Slave Girl (edited by Lydia Maria Child) featured the same theme, but with important changes, effectively giving her an agency Child's main characters never had.

== Background ==
Lydia Maria Child (1802–1880) was an influential writer who advocated for Native Americans, women, and enslaved people. Already an abolitionist, she and her husband joined a group of antislavery reformers under the influence of William Lloyd Garrison in the 1830s.

Scholars credit Child with the invention of the "tragic mulatta", a mixed-race woman in a slave-owning society whose life ends tragically, and being the first to introduce the trope in American Literature. Many legal codes in the United States dealt with miscegenation; mixed-race marriages were forbidden, and the legal doctrine of Partus sequitur ventrem meant that children had to accept the status of the mother, meaning that an enslaved mother's children would automatically "belong" to the person enslaving the mother. The "tragic mulatta", then, is a mixed-race woman who almost passes for white and falls in love with a white man, but is legally (and sometimes psychologically) incapable of living independently from that man. The narrative almost always ends in tragedy, and often suicide.

== Plot summary ==
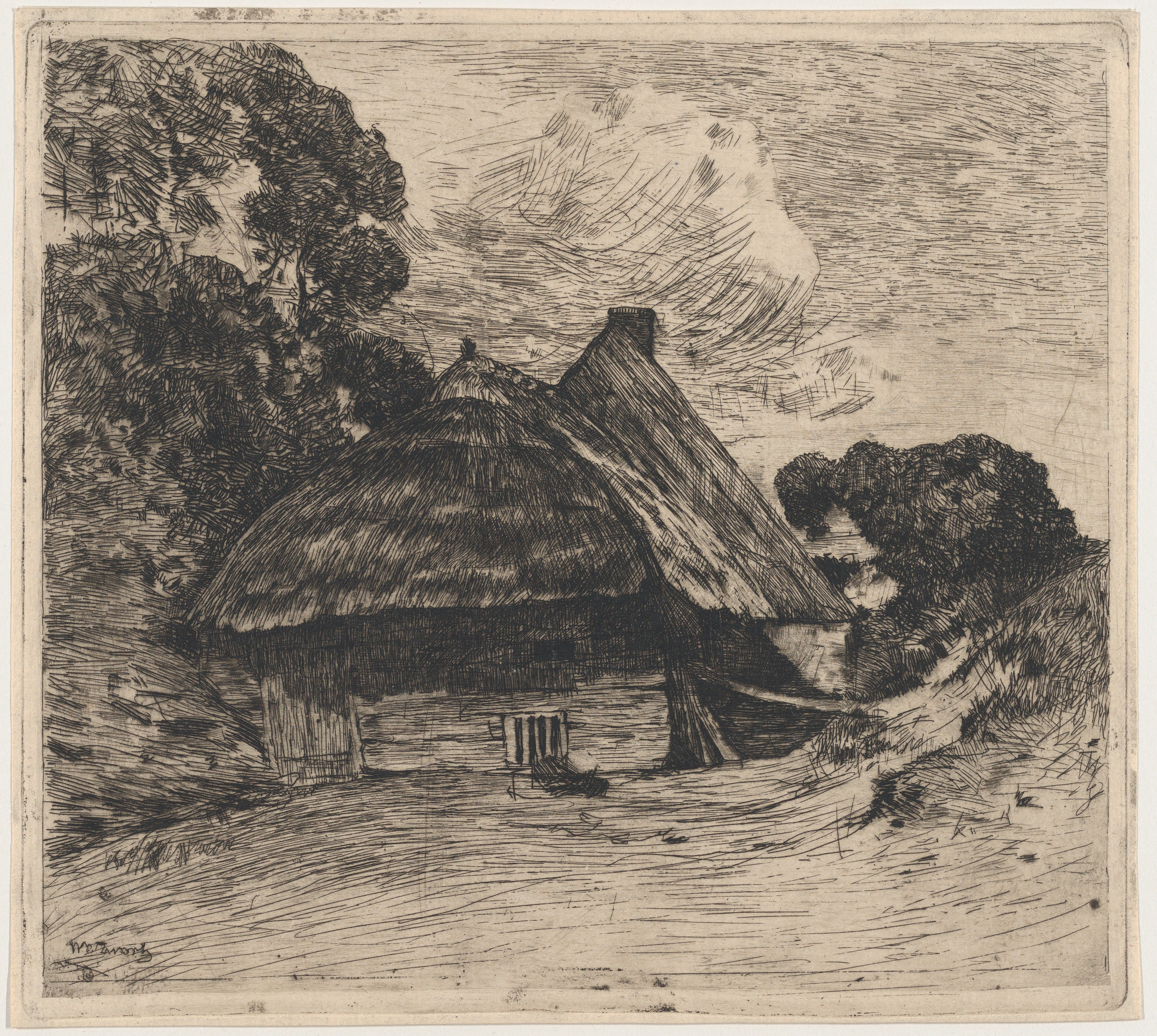
Cottage

The setting of the story is a cottage in Augusta, GA, before the Civil War. The two main characters, Rosalie, a "quadroon", and her husband Edward, a "Georgian," are living together in "a marriage sanctioned by Heaven, though unrecognized on earth" Rosalie, as a partly African-American woman, cannot legally marry a White man, but they live together as if they are man and wife, and she makes no legal claim on her common-law husband. They have a daughter named Xarifa, who grows up sheltered.

Edward develops political ambition, and for leverage he marries a wealthy white woman, the daughter of an important politician, essentially destroying the marriage between him and Rosalie. He asks her to be his mistress but she declines, finding it morally repulsive. Rosalie and Xarifa live alone in the cottage until Rosalie died of heart break from losing Edward. Xarifa had been taken care of by teachers including George Elliot, a young man hired by her father, but Edward becomes an alcoholic due to the guilt he feels after Rosalie's death. His drinking becomes his downfall: he falls off his horse when drunk, and dies--without a will, but his wife makes no change and continues to provide for his daughter.

Xarifa and her harp teacher fall in love and plan to move to France together, but Xarifa was sold before this could occur: "Rosalie, though she knew it not, had been the daughter of a slave; whose wealthy master, though he remained attached to her to the end of her days, had carelessly omitted to have papers of manumission recorded". Because Rosalie's mother had never been manumitted, her daughter and her granddaughter are still legally the property of the owner's family. Xarifa was auctioned off to the highest bidder, who is a man who tries to "win her favor, by flattery and presents", but she refuses to become his lover. Xarifa and George plan an escape but are betrayed by another enslaved person who is a double agent, and George is shot and killed in the attempt. Afterward, Xarifa's owner, having lost his patience, rapes her and she takes her own life--for the tragic mulatta, sexual violence and death are the only options.

== Characters ==
- Rosalie, the "quadroon" of the title, is a young woman who can almost pass for white; she loves Edward knowing that she cannot marry him. She and their child, Xarifa, live in a secluded cottage in Georgia until Edward moves out to marry a White woman.
- Edward, a well-to-do scion of an established Southern family, he falls in love with Rosalie and lives with her, until political ambition makes him take up with an important man's daughter. He marries her, becomes an alcoholic, and dies having fallen off his horse, drunk.
- Xarifa, Rosalie's daughter, is an octoroon, living an isolated tragic life that ends in tragedy and death when her grandmother's "owner"'s family discovers the papers that claim ownership. Since slavery descends matrilineally, Xarifa legally belongs to them, and they put her on the auction block.
- George was the harp teacher Edward hired to teach Xarifa. He fell in love with Xarifa and planned to run away to France with her, but the plan was betrayed and he was shot during the attempt.

== Themes ==
=== Love ===
The detailed description of the landscape in "The Quadroons" was seen as a metaphor for Rosalie and Edward's relationship. The passion flower, which is described as being exotic, represents Rosalie's mixed race, and the magnolia represents Edward as being a southern man. Their love, of course, could not legalized as marriage: "The couple have a genuine love for one another, and because of this love, Rosalie wants to sanctify their marriage to the heavens, even if it cannot be sanctified under law".

=== Death: tragic, suicidal, homicidal ===
Every one of the main characters dies: Rosalie soon dies after she sees Edward and his new wife, Charlotte, a year after their marriage. A year before, Rosalie had refused to be Edward's mistress. Child makes it clear to point out that Rosalie felt inadequate with herself, referring to her blackness or her otherness, that was seen as weak and submissive. This is the reason she ultimately succumbed to her death. Edward takes her death very hard and blames himself, turning to drink--which kills him. George Elliot, their daughter's music teacher, is killed in the attempt to escape, and Xarifa commits suicide after being raped by the man who bought her. Child makes sure that readers know how slavery and this society has caused the destruction of the entire family, and that the tragic mulatta, who was already the product of sexual violence, in turn becomes a victim of sexual violence, with death either as an attendant outcome or as an alternative.

== Influence ==
Child's works tackled economical, social, racial and sexual issues that provoked movements inside and outside the literary world. A work that was influenced by "The Quadroons" is Clotel by William Wells Brown. Harriet Jacobs's Incidents in the Life of a Slave Girl, although an autobiography and not a work of fiction, has been interpreted as "a retelling" of "The Quadroons".

== Publication history ==
The story was first published in 1842 in the Liberty Bell, an annual abolitionist gift book published from 1839 to 1858. It was republished in 1846 in a collection called Fact and Fiction: A Collection of Stories.

== Reception ==
"The Quadroons" is a work that is seldom discussed without being pulled into Child's other short works at the time. Most critics at the time of its publishing did not receive her works very well; many would say that Child would add details to her stories to exaggerate issues. In a letter sent to Maria Weston Chapman, Lydia Maria Child said she wanted to get the attention of those that are younger and interested in romantic stories rather than those critiquing her work. This has led to people arguing whether "The Quadroons" would be considered a success or failure. Child could continue to influence other writers with her perspective on slavery, feminism, and even transcendentalism.

== See also ==
=== "Tragic mulatto" narratives ===
- "Désirée’s Baby" by Kate Chopin
- Imitation of Life by Fannie Hurst
- Iola Leroy, or Shadows Uplifted by Frances Harper
- Passing by Nella Larson
- The Quadroon by Thomas Mayne Reid
- "The Sheriff's Children" by Charles W. Chesnutt
- A Sojourn in the City of Amalgamation by Jerome B. Holgate
- Uncle Tom's Cabin by Harriet Beecher-Stowe
- The White Girl by Vera Caspary
