= Jerome B. Holgate =

American novelist

- Born: Jerome Bonaparte Holgate; October 7, 1812; Burlington, Vermont
- Died: April 7, 1893 (aged 80); Utica, New York
- Writing career
- Pen name: Oliver Bolokitten
- Language: English
- Notable work: A Sojourn in the City of Amalgamation

Jerome Bonaparte Holgate (October 7, 1812 – April 7, 1893) was an American author and genealogist who wrote the dystopian novel A Sojourn in the City of Amalgamation (1835). He was the author of another novel, Noachidæ: Or, Noah and His Descendants (1860).

== Biography ==
Jerome Bonaparte Holgate was born in Burlington, Vermont on October 7, 1812. He lived in Utica, New York by his 20s. In 1833, he participated in Utica Literary Club debates on colonization (sending enslaved black people back to Africa) versus immediate freeing of the slaves, where he favored colonization. In summer 1834, at the age of 22, Holgate visited New York City, during a period of anti-abolitionist riots.

The next year in 1835, he wrote and self-published the dystopian anti-abolition novel A Sojourn in the City of Amalgamation, in the Year of Our Lord, 19--. He wrote this work under the pseudonym of Oliver Bolokitten, probably derived from his middle initial, the first part of his last name, and the second part of his last name (gate becoming gato, Spanish for cat, translated into English). He also wrote a later novel, Noachidæ: Or, Noah and His Descendants (1860), which is set in antediluvian times. Science fiction critic John Clute noted Noachiæ as being "much less offensive" than A Sojourn in the City of Amalgamation, which he described as probably "seem[ing] grotesque" in its racism even for the audience of 1835. Holgate was an obscure author.

He was also a significant figure in American genealogy.

He died in Utica on April 7, 1893.

== Bibliography ==
- A Sojourn in the City of Amalgamation, in the Year of Our Lord, 19-- New York : The Author (1835)
- Key to A Historical, Genealogical, Biographical, Geographical, and Chronological Chart: On a Novel and Interesting Plan (1838)
- Atlas of American History; on a Novel Plan: Comprising a Complete Synopsis of the Events from the Discovery of the American Continent by Columbus in 1492 to the Year 1842 (1842)
- American genealogy : being a history of some of the early settlers of North America and their descendants, from their first emigration to the present time ... (1848)
- Beekman family records (1848)
- Conversations on the Present Age of the World in Connection with Prophecy (1853)
- Noachidæ: Or, Noah and His Descendants (1860
- Shortcomings of the Puritan church, and Reorganization of society (1863)
