= Jessica Stern =

American scholar and academic on terrorism

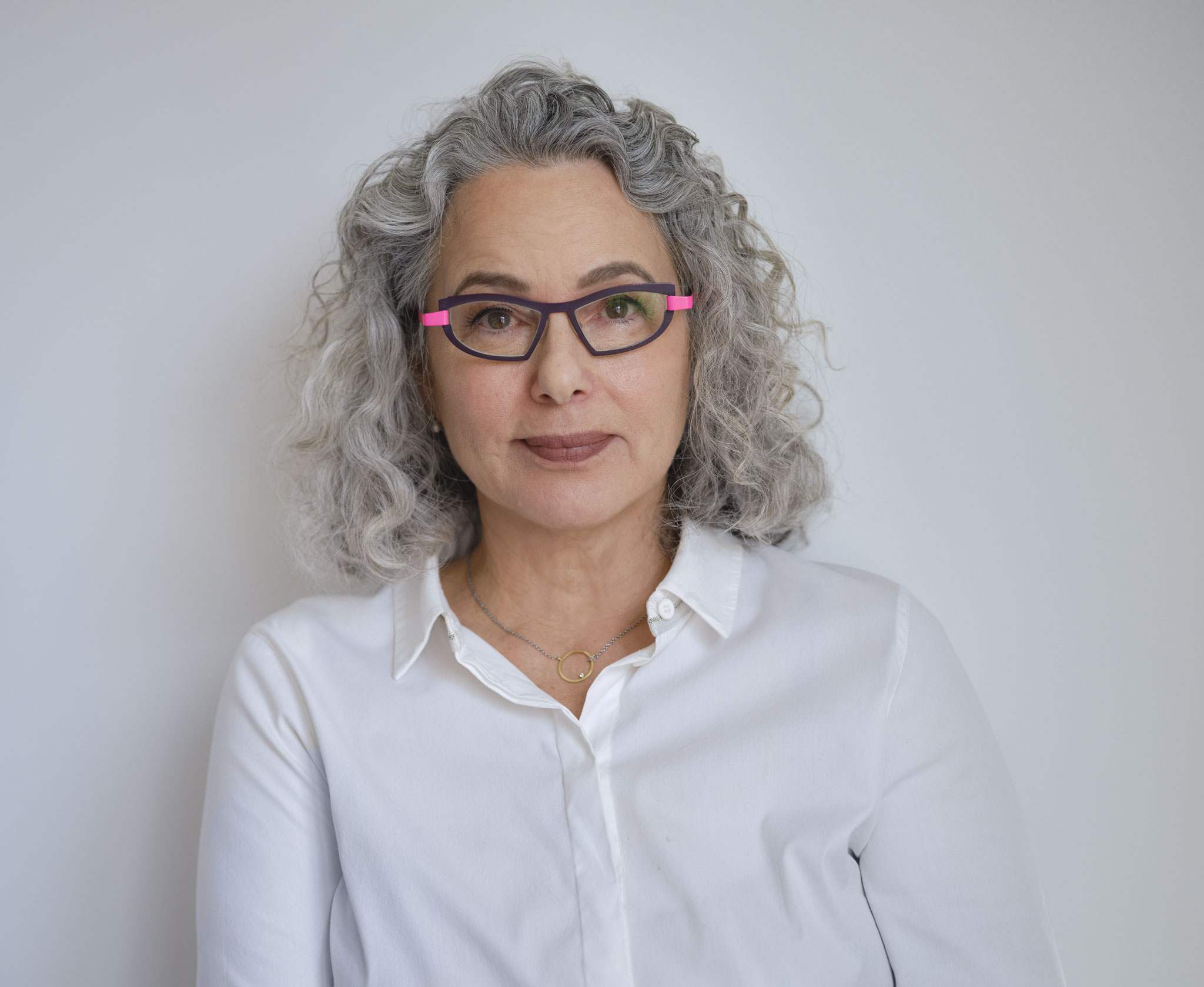
- Born: February 11, 1958 (age 68)
- Education: Barnard College (BS), Massachusetts Institute of Technology (MS), Harvard University (PhD)
- Spouse: Chester G. Atkins
- Children: 1
- Website: jessicasternbooks.com

Jessica Eve Stern (born February 11, 1958) is an American scholar and academic on terrorism. Stern serves as a research professor at the Pardee School of Global Studies at Boston University. Earlier she had been a lecturer at Harvard University. She serves on the Hoover Institution Task Force on National Security and Law. In 2001, she was featured in Time magazine's series on Innovators. In 2009, she was awarded a Guggenheim Fellowship for her work on trauma and violence. Her book ISIS: The State of Terror (2015), was co-authored with J.M. Berger.

== Education ==
- PhD, Harvard University: Public Policy, 1992.
- MS, Massachusetts Institute of Technology: Technology Policy Program (Chemical Engineering), 1988.
- BS, Barnard College, Major: Chemistry. Minor: Russian. 1985.

== Career ==
Stern served on President Bill Clinton's National Security Council staff from 1994 to 1995 as the director for Russian, Ukrainian, and Eurasian Affairs. From 1998 to 1999, she was the Superterrorism Fellow at the Council on Foreign Relations; and from 1995 to 1996, she was a national fellow at Stanford University's Hoover Institution, where she is a member of the Task Force on National Security and Law. Stern was a postdoctoral analyst for Lawrence Livermore National Laboratory from 1992 to 1994, where she analyzed political developments in Russia that could put nuclear materials or fissile materials at risk for use by terrorists. Stern is a member of the Trilateral Commission and the Council on Foreign Relations. She was named a Council on Foreign Relations International Affairs Fellow, national fellow at the Hoover Institution, fellow of the World Economic Forum, and a Harvard MacArthur Fellow.

In 2009, she was a fellow at the Guggenheim Foundation, the Yaddo Colony for the Arts, the MacDowell Colony and was also an Erikson Scholar at the Erik Erikson Institute.

Stern is a research professor at the Frederick S. Pardee School of Global Studies and Boston University.

Stern was a lecturer on counter-terrorism and law at Harvard Law School and Harvard Kennedy School from 1999 to 2016.

She has served on the advisory board of the American Bar Association Committee on Law Enforcement and National Security and the editorial boards of Current History and Bulletin of the Atomic Scientists.

Stern is currently a fellow at the FXB Center for Health and Human Rights at the Harvard School of Public Health, and she is an advanced academic candidate at the Massachusetts Institute of Psychoanalysis.

== Published works ==
External videos
- Booknotes interview with Stern on Terror in the Name of God, October 12, 2003, C-SPAN
- Washington Journal interview with Stern on Terror in the Name of God, May 14, 2004, C-SPAN
- Q&A interview with Stern on ISIS: The State of Terror, April 19, 2015, C-SPAN

Stern is the co-author of ISIS: The State of Terror (2015) with J.M. Berger; Stern authored Denial: A Memoir of Terror (2010), Terror in the Name of God: Why Religious Militants Kill (2004), and The Ultimate Terrorists (2001). She has also published articles on terrorism and weapons of mass destruction.

=== Articles in refereed journals ===
- "Response to Marc Sageman's 'The Stagnation in Terrorism Research,'" Terrorism and Political Violence, 2014.
- "X: A Case Study of a Swedish Neo-Nazi and His Reintegration into Swedish Society," Behavioral Sciences & the Law, Spring 2014.
- "PTSD: Policy Issues," Psychoanalytic Psychology, Spring 2014.
- Co-Editor with Gary LaFree of Homeland Security and Terrorism and author of editorial conclusion, "Strengths and Limits of Criminological Research on Terrorism," 661-665; Special issue of Criminology and Public Policy, August 2009.
- "The Dangers and Demands of Cosmopolitan Law," 116 Yale L.J. Pocket Part 322 (2007).
- "Precaution Against Terrorism," with Jonathan Wiener, Duke, Journal of Risk Research (June 2006): 393-447.
- "Dreaded Risks and the Control of Biological Weapons," International Security (Winter 2003).
- "The Prospects for Domestic Bioterror," Emerging Infectious Diseases (July–August, 1999).
- "Apocalypse Never, Poison Possible," (discussion) Survival (Winter 1999).
- "Weapons of Mass Impact" (discussion) Politics and the Life Sciences, 1996.
- "U.S. Assistance Programs for Improving MPC&A in the Former Soviet Union," Nonproliferation Review Winter, 1996. Also published as "Cooperative Activities to Improve Material Protection, Control, and Accountability in the Former Soviet Union," in Bill Potter and John Shields, The Nunn-Lugar Program: Donor and Recipient Country Perspectives (MIT Press, 1997.)
- "Cooperative Security and the CWC: A Comparison of the Chemical and Nuclear Weapons Regimes," Contemporary Security Policy, Fall 1994.
- "Strategic Decision Making, Alliances, and the Chemical Weapons Convention," Security Studies, Summer 1994.
- "Chemical and Biological Weapons in the Third World," (with Marie I. Chevrier), Boston College Third World Law Journal Winter 1991.
- "Moscow Meltdown: Can Russia Survive?" International Security, Spring 1994. Also published in Russian by Carnegie Endowment for International Peace.

=== Policy articles ===
- Hoover Institution: "An Amended Front-Page Rule: The Imperative to Protect Institutions," Defining Ideas, Hoover Institution, January 29, 2014.
- "The War Against Terror Must Be Fought With Words Too," TIME Magazine, December 16, 2013.
- "We Need to Worry About Somali Terrorists in the U.S.," TIME Magazine, September 26, 2013.
- "The Suicidal Tendencies of Suicide Bombers", Foreign Affairs, August 28, 2013.
- "Terrorism Research Has Not Stagnated," with John Horgan, Chronicle of Higher Education, May 2013.
- "Brief Interviews with Hideous Terrorists," Foreign Policy, April 25, 2013.
- “Terrorism After the 2003 Invasion of Iraq,” with Megan McBride, March 19, 2013. For “Costs of War” project of Brown University's Watson Institute.
- “Can Google Make Non-Violence Cool?” Defining Ideas, August 25, 2011.
- “Terror and Mortality,” Journal of Democracy, September 2011.
- “Muslims in America,” National Interest, May/June 2011, 38-46.
- "Getting Deradicalization Right", Foreign Affairs, with Marisa Porges, May/June 2010.
- “Mind Over Martyr,” Foreign Affairs, January 2010.
- “Holy Avengers,” Financial Times Weekend Magazine, 12 June 2004.
- “Forum: Caliphate of Terror,” Harvard Magazine July–August 2004.
- “Al Qaeda: The Protean Enemy,” Foreign Affairs (July/August 2003). Also published in James Hoge and Gideon Rose, editors, Understanding the War on Terror (Foreign Affairs books: 2005).
- “Preparing for a War on Terrorism,” Current History (November 2001).
- "Confronting Biological Terrorism," Harvard International Review, Spring 2001.
- “Meeting with the Muj,” Bulletin of the Atomic Scientists (January/February, 2001).
- “Pakistan’s Jihad Culture,” Foreign Affairs (November/December 2000).
- "Lethal Compounds: The New Chemical Weapons Ban," Brookings Review, Summer 1994.
- "Will Terrorists Turn to Poison?" Orbis, Summer 1993.
- "The Case of Thiodiglycol," review, Politics and the Life Sciences, August 1993.

== Recognition ==
Stern received recognition from the Federal Bureau of Investigation for her efforts against international terrorism.

The character of Dr. Julia Kelly in the 1997 film The Peacemaker was partly based on Stern's work at the National Security Council.

== Personal life ==
In an article published in The Washington Post on 20 June 2010, Stern revealed that she believes the reason for her fascination with terrorism is due to terror that she experienced in her own life when she and her sister were raped at gunpoint by an intruder when Stern was aged 15 (her sister a year younger). She also ascribes her lack of a normal fear reaction to this event and subsequently, which has been suggested to her by a therapist is due to post traumatic stress disorder.

Stern is Jewish and was the "child of a refugee and Holocaust survivor."

She resides in Cambridge with her husband Chester G. Atkins.
