= Nehemiah Adams =

American clergyman and writer

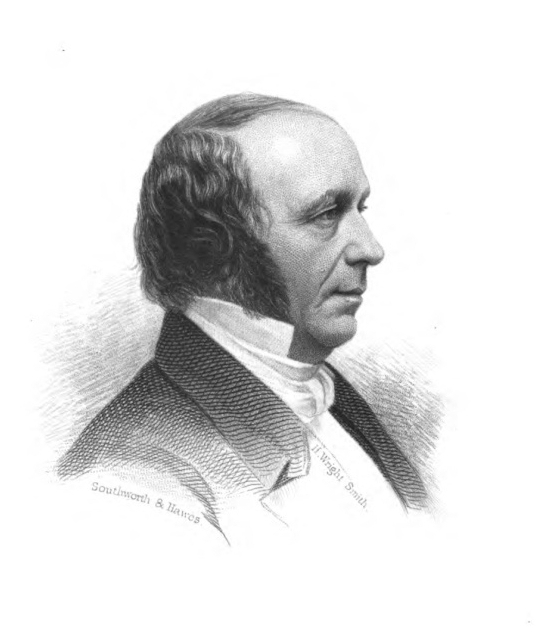
- Born: February 19, 1806; Salem, Massachusetts, US
- Died: October 6, 1878 (aged 72)
- Education: Harvard University, Andover Theological Seminary
- Occupation: clergyman

Signature
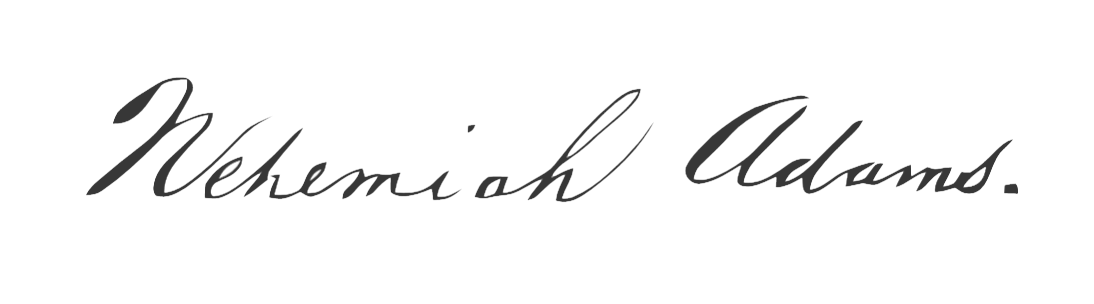

Reverend Nehemiah Adams (February 19, 1806 – October 6, 1878) was an American clergyman and writer.

== Biography ==
He was born in Salem, Massachusetts, in 1806 to Mehitabel Torrey Adams and Nehemiah Adams. He graduated from Harvard University in 1826 and from Andover Theological Seminary in 1829, the year he was ordained as co-pastor, with Abiel Holmes, of the First Congregational Church in Cambridge, Massachusetts. In 1832 he married Martha Hooper.

In 1834, he became pastor of Union Congregational Church in Boston, Massachusetts. He would remain in that position until his death in 1878. In 1850, he married again, to Sarah Brackett.

In 1854, he took a trip to the American South and wrote a book entitled A South-Side View of Slavery (Boston, 1855). In the book, he lauded slavery as beneficial to the Negroes' religious character. This book was one of several polemic works he wrote. It caused a great sensation, and he received much hostile criticism. The book was attacked by abolitionists for its perceived moderation; the abolitionist newspaper The Liberator called it "as vile a work as was ever written, in apology and defence of 'the sum of all villanies'". The abolitionist William Wells Brown criticized Adams. In 1861, he wrote a successor volume, The Sable Cloud, a Southern Tale with Northern Comments, to answer his attackers, and it was met with a similar response.

He also wrote The Cross in the Cell, Scriptural Argument for Endless Punishment, Broadcast, At Eventide, and a Life of John Eliot. He was a member of the American Tract Society and the American Board for Foreign Missions.

In 1869, in consequence of his failing health, his people procured an associate pastor and gave Adams a long leave of absence. He made a voyage round the world and described it in Under the Mizzenmast: A Voyage Around the World (1871).

Adams died in 1878, aged 72, survived by four of his eight offspring:

- Anna Hooper [b.d.8 December 1832]
- Martha Hooper [b.8 August 1834-d.29 September 1862] married 8 June 1859 Thomas Joseph Lee
- Catharine [b.1836-d.19 January 1857]
- Rev. William Hooper [b.8 January 1838-d.15 May 1880] married 1866 Paulina Thomas; married 1878 Margaret Holmes
- Robert Chamblet [b.1 December 1839-d.10 August 1902] married Mary Eminy Job
- Susan Gertrude [b.April 1841-d.19 January 1917] married Daniel Ward Job
- Mary [b.April 25,1846-d.3 September 1874]
- Sarah [b.1847-d.1879]

== Notes ==
Attribution:
