= The Black Man =

1863 book by William Wells Brown

- Author: William Wells Brown
- Publication date: 1863

The Black Man: His Antecedents, His Genius, and His Achievements is a book published in 1863 by William Wells Brown which sketches the lives of individuals Brown determined had by their "own genius, capacity, and intellectual development, surmounted the many obstacles which slavery and prejudice have thrown in their way, and raised themselves to positions of honor and influence".
