= What Will He Do With It? =

1858 novel

- American first edition
- Author: Edward Bulwer-Lytton
- Language: English
- Genre: Social novel
- Publisher: William Blackwood and Sons
- Publication date: 1858
- Publication place: United Kingdom
- Media type: Print

What Will He Do With It? is an 1858 social novel by the British writer Edward Bulwer-Lytton, writing under the pen name Pisistratus Caxton. It was published in four volumes by the William Blackwood and Sons in 1859, having previously been serialised in the publisher's Blackwood's Magazine from 1857 to 1858. At the time Bulwer-Lytton had become a prominent politician and served as Secretary of State for the Colonies in the Earl of Derby's government. A former Radical, the novel was written by Bulwer-Lytton to popularise his newfound philosiphy conservative nationalism. It was released in the United States by Harper and Brothers.

== Bibliography ==
- Mathieu, Joachim. Edward Bulwer-Lytton's England and the English. Kovač, 2001.
- Mitchell, Leslie George. Bulwer Lytton: The Rise and Fall of a Victorian Man of Letters. Hambledon and London, 2003.
