= The Sheriff's Children =

Short story by Charles W. Chesnutt

"The Sheriff's Children" is a short story written by Charles W. Chesnutt in his collection The Wife of His Youth and Other Stories of the Color-Line. Chesnutt's work was written during the era of post-bellum literature in which themes of racism were explored, specifically in southern American states. One of Chesnutt's more famous works, along with "The Passing of Grandison", the story focuses on issues of race, miscegenation, and identity.

== Characters ==
Sheriff Campbell is the sheriff of Branson County who is the father of Polly and the mulatto prisoner named Tom. He is one of the more educated and wealthy townspeople of Troy based on his wealth within slavery before the Civil War. He feels a sense of duty to protect Tom as a prisoner from the lynch mob, and later on as a father once he finds out that Tom is his son.

Tom is the illegitimate son of the Sheriff who was sold to another owner in Alabama. He was accused of killing Captain Walker by the people within the town of Troy. This accusation was based on witnesses saying he was the last person to see the Captain before his death. Tom explains that he is the son of the Sheriff and threatens to kill the Sheriff. He, however, is shot and removes the bandage that the Sheriff places on him to save his life. He is found dead the next day.

Polly is the daughter of Sheriff Campbell. She begs her father to not go to the jail and eventually shoots Tom in order to save her father from being shot.

Captain Walker is the person who is murdered by said prisoner Tom. He was a captain during the Civil War and was well admired within Troy.

Lynch Mob is the group of townspeople who planned on removing Tom from the county jail to lynch him in order to avenge Captain Walker.

== Plot summary ==
The story takes place in Branson County, North Carolina. Within that county, the biggest city, Troy, is mainly peaceful and undisturbed. The town lives a rather typical southern lifestyle in which the town members carry on their usual business such as working and chatting with others within the town. It is known for its "southern simplicity". Troy is described as a town with "no very wealthy families", fitting the description of a town of "poor whites". The town's typical occurrences are disrupted when Captain Walker, a respected Civil War veteran, with one arm, was murdered. The town was brought to a standstill since murder rarely happened there. The townspeople became frantic and angered by the murder. Thus, the Sheriff, assembled a group of citizens to search for the murderer. The murderer was caught and taken to the jail house. It was assumed to be a local mulatto man named Tom, the last person to be seen with Captain Walker before the discovery of his murder. The citizens of the town, however, were not satisfied with the Sheriff holding Tom in the county jail until his hearing. A mob formed within the town with the intent of taking Tom from out of the county jail and lynching him. A local African-American man named Sam overheard the conversation amongst the lynch mob and reported it to the Sheriff. The Sheriff was identified as Colonel Sheriff Campbell. Sheriff Campbell, unlike the rest of those within the town, comes from a family of wealth and is highly educated. His family owned numerous slaves and had plantation style land masses before the Civil War.

Sheriff Campbell goes to the county jail to protect Tom from the lynch mob that is going to approach soon. His daughter Polly begs her father not to go to the county jail since the mob may get out of control and hurt her father. The Sheriff goes anyway and brings his pistol with him. While monitoring the jail, the mob arrives and asks for the sheriff to release Tom into their custody. The Sheriff denies them entrance in and the mob becomes enraged by the Sheriff's lack of understanding. The mob threatens to break down the door of the jail to retrieve Tom. The Sheriff states that if they try to do that, he will shoot them. The mob eventually backs down and leaves the county jail. While the Sheriff was dealing with the mob, Tom takes his pistol and uses it to try to escape. He orders the Sheriff to unlock the doors within the cell and jail. After the jail is unlocked Tom states that he has but no choice to kill the Sheriff in order to escape. He exclaims that he did not kill the captain, but the court will not believe him and hang him regardless. The Sheriff is confused and questions Tom as to why he would try to kill him after he had saved him from the lynch mob. Tom then explains that he is his bastard son who was sold when he was younger to help pay for the debts that the Sheriff and his family owed. The Sheriff then remembers Tom's mother Cicely and Tom and asks why he would try to kill his own father. Tom proclaims that the Sheriff was never a father, but a man who he shares blood with. Because of the way he treated his mother and himself, Tom believes that the Sheriff never valued him as a son because of the color of his skin. He curses him for making him feel like a white man on the inside but a black man on the outside. Tom and the sheriff continue to bicker about how he is free now and the color of his skin, that Polly enters the jail cell and shoots Tom just before he is about to kill the Sheriff. The Sheriff then wraps Tom in a tourniquet and locks him back up and returns home with Polly.

Later that night the Sheriff lays awake restless as he thinks about Tom. He becomes remorseful since he believes that he has failed to be a father to Tom and provide the life for him that he could have. He thought about freeing him as a young boy and raising him in the North and giving him an education. He then thinks about freeing him momentarily from the jail but remembers his duty as the sheriff. The Sheriff arrives early in the morning the next day at the county jail to find Tom dead. Tom had removed his bandage from the wound in his arm and bled out in the jail cell.

== Major themes ==
=== Race and racism ===
Within "The Sheriff's Children", race is a major theme that is persistently mentioned. The setting of the story takes place in North Carolina post-Civil War. The racial hierarchy within southern culture during this time was stringent and mobility within the system was difficult. The accusation that Tom was the murderer of Captain Walker is an example of how racism is a major theme within the text. Since Tom is the mulatto within town who was seen doing “suspicious activities” it must have been him because he was black. It is never revealed who the killer was, however, the town had already concluded that Tom committed the crime because of his skin color. The use of the racial slur nigger within the story explores the pejorative nature of the townspeople of Troy. The Sheriff and the townspeople use the term loosely when describing Tom. The symbolism of lynching also strikes the reader to understand the element of racism. Lynching was a tool used by southerners to threaten and kill blacks during the 18th-20th century. Thus, the mob's first instinct to lynch Tom, and not give him a fair trial, demonstrates that the white mob does not regard Tom as a citizen with rights. Tom is even aware that he has no chance of winning the case.

=== Miscegenation ===
Miscegenation is “the interbreeding of people considered to be of different racial types.” Within the short story, the relationship between the Sheriff and Cicely demonstrates the mixing of races and cultures. During the Reconstruction Era, and before the Civil War, it was deemed as a taboo to interbreed, especially between blacks and whites. The term mulatto is used within the narrative multiple times, defining the mixing of races that created Tom. A mulatto is specifically the product of one white parent and one black parent reproducing. There are other terms such as mestizo and creole that also specified specific examples of miscegenation. The term in modern times is not commonly used however during the 19th century, mulatto was used to classify biracial individuals. As many of Chesnutt's works, white passing and miscegenation occur frequently. For Tom, it was apparent that he was not fully black but still had white ancestry. He explains that he has the feature of Sheriff Campbell and his other white features, but also features from his black mother. The mixing of races had a great stigma that, The Sheriff tried to remove that element from his life. Overall, miscegenation displays the unspeakable acts between whites and blacks during this time.

=== Identity ===
Two characters that exemplify the theme of identity are Sheriff Campbell and Tom. Both men have issues with their identities. In P. Jay Delmar's The Mask as Theme and Structure: Charles W. Chesnutt's "The Sheriff's Children" and "The Passing of Grandison", Delmar examines how Sheriff Campbell wears a "mask" for most of his life until he encounters Tom right before he dies. The Sheriff is described a learned, wealthy, southern man who is loyal and dutiful to the county of Branson and the people of Troy. His unwillingness to want to serve however is a mask that he wears. According to Delmar, The Sheriff "always lived by the code of the Southern aristocracy, one which sanctioned his behavior toward his lover and child". His identity would have been tarnished if it was known that he had a mulatto son, or if it was found out that he let his son escape from remorse. Thus, he is conflicted with how to pursue his relationship with Tom. Tom also struggles with identity issues as well. Tom is biracial and struggles to identify as a biracial man because of his blackness. His "blackness" inherently makes him an inferior subject, especially in the era and region of the story's setting. He says to Sheriff Campbell "You gave me a white man's spirit, and you made me a slave." Since his blackness defines him no matter how learned he is, his identity is still unknown. Tom also struggles to identify himself as the sheriff's son, but mainly just a product of reproduction. Since the sheriff sold him at a young age, the Sheriff doesn't hold the identity of a father, but more of an apparatus that aided in creating Tom.

=== Sense of duty ===
The Sheriff is mentioned various times within the short story that he has a duty to protect Tom, for personal interest, and as a father, once he finds out that Tom is his son. Sheriff Campbell is adamant about performing any job that he has in the most professional and admirable way. When posed with the conflict of allowing the lynch mob to enter the jail and lynch Tom, he states that he cannot because "I get seventy-five cents a day for keeping this prisoner, and he’s the only one in jail. I can't have my family suffer just to please you fellows." His motives to protect Tom at this time was based solely on his duty to provide for Polly and himself. The sense of duty changes when it is later revealed that Tom is the son that he sold years ago. He is conflicted since he understands that he has "some duty to this son of his". Although he realizes this other duty, he is never able to reconcile his mistakes since Tom takes his life the next day.
