= The Escape; or, A Leap for Freedom =

Play written by William Wells Brown

The Escape; or, A Leap for Freedom is a play written by African American abolitionist William Wells Brown. Williams Wells Brown would tour and give readings of his play at anti-Slavery rallies, lyceum lectures, and political events. In 1856, he read his unpublished play "Experience; or, How to Give the Northern Man a Backbone." In fact, abolitionist William L. Garrison suggested in 1856 that Brown was so successful with public readings of his dramas that he had to give up his role with the American Anti-Slavery Society.

While The Escape; or, A Leap for Freedom was published in 1858, it was not officially produced until 1971 at Emerson College. In 2018, the Columbia School for the Arts performed a version of the play directed by Mark H. It is one of the earliest extant pieces of African American dramatic literature.

This is a typical play from the late 1800s in five acts.

== Scene Breakdown ==
Act 1, Scene 1: A Sitting-Room in the house of Dr. Gaines

Act 1, Scene 2: Doctor's Shop of Dr. Gaines

Act 1, Scene 3: A Room in the Slave Quarters

Act 1, Scene 4: Dining Room of Dr. Gaines and Mrs. Gaines

Act 2, Scene 1: The Parlor of Dr. Gaines

Act 2, Scene 2: View in Front of the Great House

Act 2, Scene 3: A Sitting-Room in the house of Dr. Gaines

Act 3, Scene 1: Sitting-Room

Act 3, Scene 2: The Kitchen- Slaves at Work

Act 3, Scene 3: Sitting Room

Act 3, Scene 4: In the Forest near Dr. Gaines's Property

Act 3, Scene 5: Room in a Small Cottage on the Poplar Farm

Act 4, Scene 1: Interior of a Dungeon, likely the basement of Dr. Gaines's Estate

Act 4, Scene 2: The Parlor of Dr. Gaines

Act 4, Scene 3: In the Forest near Dr. Gaines's Property

Act 5, Scene 1: Bar in the American Hotel

Act 5, Scene 2: Forest at Night

Act 5, Scene 3: A Street

Act 5, Scene 4: Dining Room of a Quaker Family

Act 5, Scene 5: The Niagara River and a Ferry Boat.

== Characters ==
Dr. Gaines, Proprietor of the farm at Muddy Creek.

Rev. John Pinchen, Clergyman.

Dick Walker, Slave speculator.

Mr. Wildmarsh, Neighbor to Dr. Gaines.

Major Moore, Friend of Dr. Gaines.

Mr. White, Citizen of Massachusetts.

Bill Jennings, Slave speculator.

Jacob Scragg, Overseer to Dr. Gaines.

Mrs. Gaines, Wife of Dr. Gaines.

Mr. and Mrs. Neal and their Daughter, Quakers in Ohio.

Thomas, Mr. Neal's hired man.

Glen, Slave of Mr. Hamilton, brother-in-law of Dr. Gaines.

Melinda, Slave of Dr. Gaines, Mixed Raced.

Sampey, Slave and Son of Dr. Gaines.

Cato, Slave and Assistant of Dr. Gaines.

Sam, Dolly, Susan, and Big Sally, Slaves of Dr. Gaines.

Pete, Ned, and Bill, Slaves.

Officers, Loungers, Barkeeper, etc.

== Plot summary ==
The play follows the story of two slaves from different owners who marry in secrecy. Melinda, who is owned by Dr. Gaines, is a biracial slave who marries Glen, who is owned by Mr. Hamilton. Mrs. Gaines fears that her husband Dr. Gaines has taken a liking to Melinda and orders Dr. Gaines to sell her. Dr. Gaines then hides Melinda in a Cabin on the Property of the Poplar Farm. Dr. Gaines makes a move on Melinda which causes her to tell about her secret marriage with Glen. Dr. Gaines becomes furious and promises Melinda he will kill Glen. Melinda becomes mad and heartbroken when hearing this. Dr. Gaines lies to his wife about selling Melinda. However, Mrs. Gaines does not believe him and one night follows him to the cottage. After Dr. Gaines leaves the cottage, Mrs. Gaines breaks in and tries to force Melinda into drinking poison to kill herself. Melinda escapes and runs into the forest. Meanwhile, across on the Gains Estate, Glen is being tortured by Jacob Scragg. Sampey, another mixed race character who is a slave to his father, informs Glen of what happened to Melinda. Glen manages to escape the dungeon and meets Melinda in the forest. The couple follow the North Star to Canada to escape for freedom. Meanwhile, Dr. Gaines gets a group of men together to hunt down the runaway slaves. There is a last confrontation on the docks of a ferry that is heading to Canada. Mr. White, a northern gentleman, saves the day by holding up the slave hunters while the ferry takes off.
