= Florence Hull Winterburn =

American writer (1858–1943)

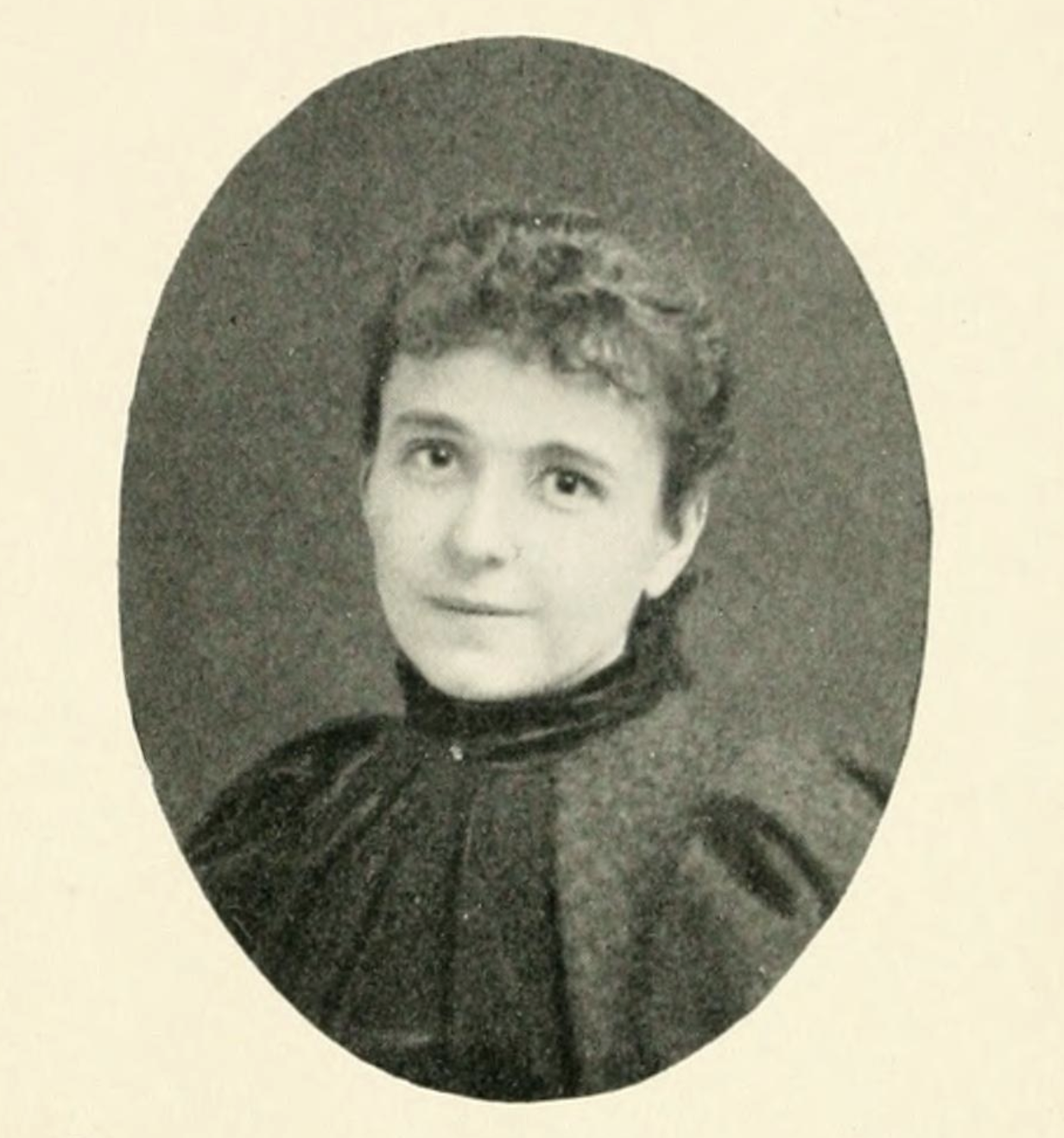
- Winterburn in 1899
- Born: Florence Hull; Chicago, Illinois, U.S.
- Occupations: author, editor
- Spouse(s): T. G. Brown; George W. Winterburn (m. 1893)
- Writing career
- Language: English
- Notable works: Nursery Ethics, From the Child's Standpoint, Southern Hearts (short stories), The Children's Health

Signature
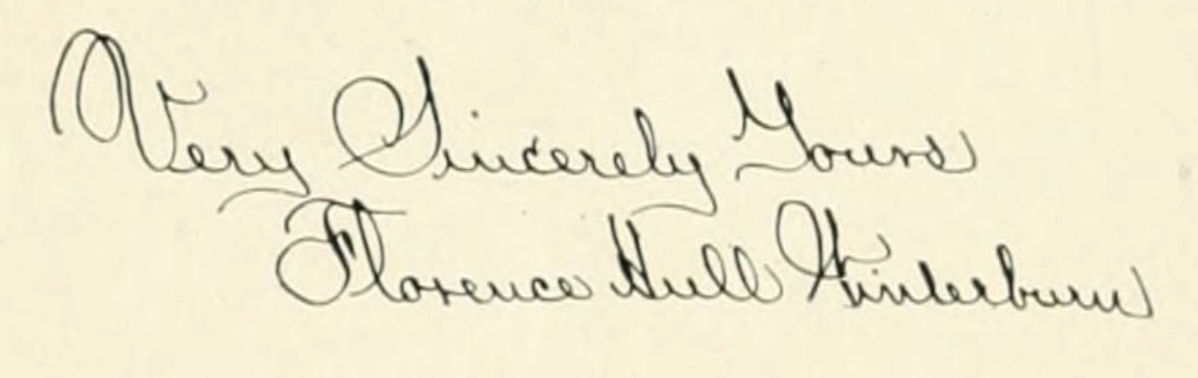

Florence Hull Winterburn was an American author and editor. Born in Illinois and educated in psychology, heredity, and education theory, she became a special writer on child training. She was the associate editor of the magazine Childhood and later served as an assistant editor for Godey's Lady's Book and Home and Country, and as managing editor of Americana. She was also a special contributor of articles on sociology topics to the Woman's Home Companion. Winterburn's published works include Nursery Ethics, From the Child's Standpoint, and a collection of short stories, Southern Hearts.

== Early life and education ==
Florence May Hull was born in Chicago, Illinois. She was the daughter of Captain Stephen Chester and Laura Hull (née Bell).

Winterburn was educated in private schools and by private tutors in Washington, D.C. She graduated from a seminary for young ladies, and afterward took a two year course at College of Elocution and Acting at Washington, graduating with a B. E. A.. She then devoted twelve years to the study of Herbert Spencer's synthetic philosophy and was a student of psychology, heredity, as well as the theory and practice of education.

== Career ==
She married first, T. G. Brown of Indiana.

She went to New York City in 1891, to do literary work and became special writer on child training. In 1893, in New York City, she married George W. Winterburn (died Nov. 18, 1911), physician, editor, and writer. After marriage, she associated with her husband in the conduct of the magazine Childhood, serving as its associate editor. It was the pioneer in the field of child study which thereafter become popular. She subsequently became editor of departments on this topic in various magazines. She was also an organizer and member of several societies of parents.

Winterburn became the assistant editor of Godey's Lady's Book in 1893, and of Home and Country in 1895. For six years in the early 20th century, she was a special contributor of articles on sociology topics to the Woman's Home Companion and other magazines; and one year as managing editor of the historical magazine, Americana. Winterburn was an essayist, and a writer of short stories for magazines, which were collected in a volume, Southern Hearts. She was also the author of Nursery Ethics; The Child’s Standpoint; The Children's Health; as well as Vacation Hints. Winterburn was also an occasional lecturer.

From 1903 to 1905, she lived in Europe, especially in Paris, where she went to study psychology and literature. She later returned to New York City.

== Selected works ==
- The Children's Health, 1901
- From the child's standpoint; views of child life and nature; a book for parents and teachers, 1859
- Miss Dicks, 1911
- The Mother in Education
- Novel Ways of Entertaining
- Nursery Ethics, 1895, 1899
- Principles of Correct Dress
- Southern Hearts (short stories), 1901
- Vacation Hints, 1911
The children's health

The mother in education

From the child's standpoint

Novel ways of entertaining

Nursery ethics

Southern hearts
