= Inspirações da Tarde =

1858 novel by Bernardo Guimarães

- Author: Bernardo Guimarães
- Language: Portuguese
- Publication date: 1858
- Publication place: Brazil

Inspirações da Tarde is a Portuguese language novel by Brazilian author, Bernardo Guimarães. It was first published in 1858.
