= Russ Castronovo =

American professor (born 1965)

- Born: October 22, 1965 (age 60)
- Occupation: Professor
- Spouse: Leslie Bow

Russell "Russ" Castronovo (born October 22, 1965) is Tom Paine Professor of English and Dorothy Draheim Professor of American Studies at the University of Wisconsin–Madison. He is also director of the university's Center for the Humanities.

== Bibliography ==
- American Insecurity and the Origins of Vulnerability, 2023
- The Oxford Handbook to Twentieth-Century American Literature, 2022 (co-edited with Leslie Bow)
- Propaganda 1776: Secrets, Leaks, and Revolutionary Communications in Early America, 2014
- The Oxford Handbook to Propaganda Studies, 2013 (co-edited with Jonathan Auerbach)
- The Oxford Handbook to Nineteenth-Century American Literature, 2012
- States of Emergency: Towards a Future History of American Studies, 2009 (co-edited with Susan Gillman)
- Beautiful Democracy: Aesthetics and the Anarchy of Global Culture, 2007
- Materializing Democracy: Toward a Revitalized Cultural Politics, 2002 (co-edited with Dana Nelson)
- Necro Citizenship: Death, Eroticism, and the Public Sphere in the Nineteenth-Century United States, 2001
- Fathering the Nation: American Genealogies of Slavery and Freedom, 1995
