= International Peace Congress =

Series of international meetings held in Europe from 1843 to 1853

International Peace Congress, or International Congress of the Friends of Peace, was the name of a series of international meetings of representatives from peace societies from throughout the world held in various places in Europe from 1843 to 1853. An initial congress at London in 1843 was followed by an annual series of congresses from 1848 until 1853.

== London, 1843 ==
The first International Congress was held in London at the suggestion of Joseph Sturge and on the initiative of the American Peace Society in 1843. The host was the London Peace Society. 294 British, 37 American and 6 Continental delegates attended.

== Brussels, 1848 ==
Elihu Burritt organized the Congress of 1848, the first after the French Revolution of February 1848. It was chaired by Auguste Visschers, a Belgian lawyer and philanthropist. The participants met at Brussels in September of that year. Among the delegates were Cobden, Thierry, Girardin, and Bastiat. The congress adopted resolutions urging limitation of armaments and the placing of a ban upon foreign loans for war purposes.

== Paris, 1849 ==
One year after Brussels, the Peace Congress met in Paris from 22 to 24 August 1849, with Victor Hugo as president The proceedings were published by Charles Gilpin. Among the speakers were many of the chief philosophers and politicians of the time, including Frederic Bastiat, Charles Gilpin, Richard Cobden and Henry Richard William Wells Brown was invited to speak against slavery. Hugo introduced the concept of the United States of Europe.

== Later congresses ==
Through the next decades, more congresses were convened in various cities:

- 4th congress: Frankfurt am Main (1850)
- 5th congress: London (1851), co-inciding with the Great Exhibition.
- 6th congress: Manchester (1852) Here Richard Cobden and John Bright took part in the discussions.
- 7th congress: Edinburgh (1853)

The series was interrupted by an interval of wars during which the pacifists were unable to raise their voices.

== See also ==
- Peace congress
