= J.M. Berger =

American scholar (born 1967)

- Born: John M. Berger; 1967 (age 58–59)
- Occupations: Scholar, novelist

Academic background
- Education: Swansea University School of Law (PhD)

Academic work
- Discipline: Criminologist
- Sub-discipline: Terrorism scholar
- Institutions: Center on Terrorism, Extremism, and Counterterrorism
- Notable works: Jihad Joe; ISIS: The State of Terror
- Website: www.jmberger.com

John M. Berger (born 1967) is an American scholar of extremism and terrorism, investigative journalist, and novelist. He has a PhD in criminology from the Swansea University School of Law. Berger is a senior research fellow at the Center on Terrorism, Extremism, and Counterterrorism and has served as a consultant for government agencies and tech companies. He has written three books on the subjects of extremism and terrorism, including ISIS: The State of Terror (with Jessica Stern) and Jihad Joe. Berger has also authored two novels.

== Education and career ==
John M. Berger was born in 1967. He is the creator of the investigative journalism site Intelwire, and was also involved in the making of several documentary films. He has published both journalistic and academic works, and was a contributor to the magazines Foreign Policy, The Atlantic, and Politico.

Berger has a PhD in criminology from the Swansea University School of Law. He is a senior research fellow at the Center on Terrorism, Extremism, and Counterterrorism (CTEC) of the Middlebury Institute of International Studies at Monterey and an associate fellow of the International Centre for Counter-Terrorism. He is also a research fellow at the VOX-Pol Network of Excellence and is a former non-resident fellow of the Brookings Institution. He has also served as a consultant for tech companies and government agencies on terrorism and extremism related issues. He was on the Independent Advisory Committee of the Global Internet Forum to Counter Terrorism. He largely writes on extremism, particularly when it comes to propaganda and ideology.

Berger was one of four outside researchers who collaborated with the German Marshall Fund's Alliance for Securing Democracy on the Hamilton 68 dashboard, alongside Clint Watts, Andrew Weisburd, and Jonathon Morgan. Berger authored the dashboard's methodology paper.

== Works ==
His first book, Jihad Joe: Americans Who Go to War in the Name of Islam, was published in 2011 by Potomac Books. It covers homegrown jihadism in the United States. Many documents used in the creation of the book were obtained the Freedom of Information Act. In 2015, Berger and fellow terrorism scholar Jessica Stern wrote ISIS: The State of Terror, on the ideology and propaganda of ISIS. It received positive reviews and in 2015 was listed by The Wall Street Journal as one of their 10 recommended books on the evolution of terror in the Middle East, and listed it as a work of notable nonfiction for that year. Foreign Affairs listed it as one of the best books of 2015.

In 2018 he wrote Extremism for MIT Press, as part of their Essential Knowledge Series. The book gives an introduction to extremism as a concept and an analysis of it and its manifestations.

In 2020 he published his debut fiction novel, Optimal. His second novel, The Pope's Hitman, a thriller, was published in October 2026 by Crooked Lane Books. It follows Father Francis Loyola, a retired assassin who previously worked for the Vatican.

== Bibliography ==
- —— (2011). Jihad Joe: Americans Who Go to War in the Name of Islam. Dulles: Potomac Books. ISBN 978-1-59797-693-0.
- Stern, Jessica; —— (2015). ISIS: The State of Terror. New York: Ecco Press. ISBN 978-0-06-239554-2.
- —— (2018). Extremism. The MIT Press Essential Knowledge Series. Cambridge: MIT Press. ISBN 978-0-2625-3587-8.
- —— (2020). Optimal. Self-published. ISBN 979-8-67540-562-6.
- —— (2026). The Pope's Hitman. New York: Crooked Lane Books. ISBN 979-8-89242-852-1.
