= Shirley Samuels =

American academic

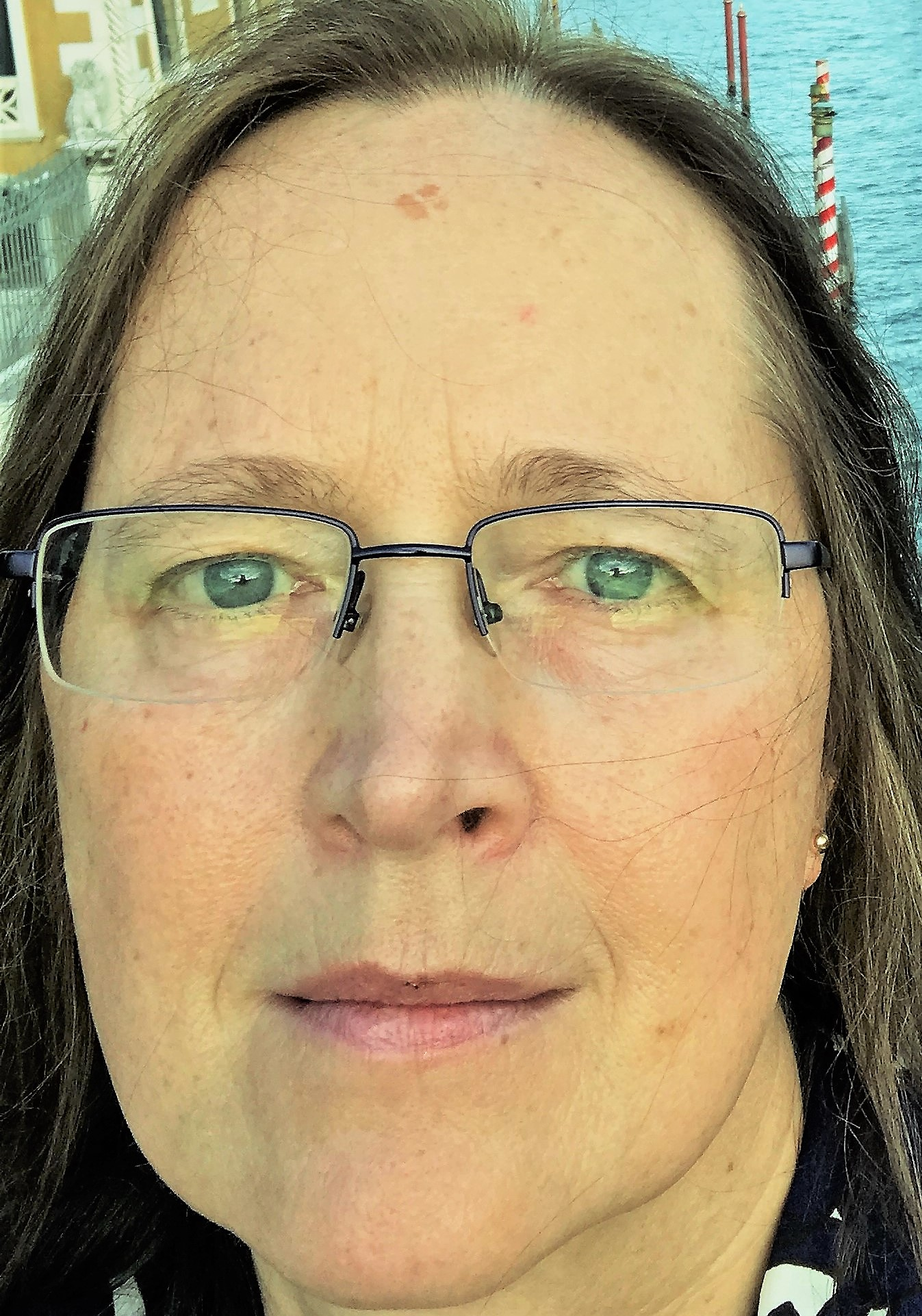
- Awards: American Antiquarian Society Fellow; Modern Language Association Northeast Division Fellow; American Council of Learned Societies Fellow; Society for the Humanities Fellow; Library Company of Philadelphia Fellow; Huntington Library Distinguished Fellow; Center for Mark Twain Studies Quarry Farm Fellow

Academic background
- Education: University of California, Berkeley (B.A., M.A., Ph.D.)
- Doctoral advisor: Eric Sundquist

Academic work
- Institutions: Cornell University; University of Delaware

Shirley Samuels is an American academic. She is the Thomas and Dorothy Litwin Professor of American Studies. Formerly the Picket Family Chair of the Literatures in English Department, she has also been director of American Studies at Cornell University and is known for her work on American literature and culture.

== Education and career ==
Samuels has a B.A. (1977), M.A. (1981), and Ph.D. (1986) from the University of California, Berkeley. Following her Ph.D. she was an assistant professor at Princeton University. She moved to Cornell University in 1986 and was promoted to full professor in 1998. From 2000 until 2001 she was the Fletcher Brown Professor of Humanities at the University of Delaware. From 2009 until 2015, she chaired the History of Art Department, and from 2009 until 2012 she was dean of the Flora Rose House on the Cornell University campus.

Samuels' work includes visual studies where she focuses on challenges with photographic representation of the American Civil War.

== Awards and honors ==
Samuels has been a fellow at the American Antiquarian Society in the Northeast Modern Language Association (NEMLA) division. She has also had fellowships from the American Council of Learned Societies, the Society for the Humanities, and the Library Company of Philadelphia. In 2015-2016, she was the Los Angeles Times distinguished fellow at the Huntington Library. In 2020 she was named a Quarry Farm Fellow by the Center For Mark Twain Studies.

== Selected publications ==
- Samuels, Shirley (2025). Haunted by the Civil War: Cultural Testimony in the Nineteenth-Century United States. Princeton University Press. ISBN 978-0691248578
- Samuels, Shirley, ed. (2019). Race and Vision in the Nineteenth-Century United States. Lexington Books. ISBN 978-1498573139
- Samuels, Shirley, ed. (2012). The Cambridge Companion to Abraham Lincoln. Cambridge Companions to American Studies. Cambridge: Cambridge University Press. doi:10.1017/ccol9780521193160. ISBN 978-0-521-19316-0.
- Samuels, Shirley (2012). Reading the American Novel 1780-1865. Wiley-Blackwell. ISBN 978-0631232872.
- Samuels, Shirley (2004). Facing America: iconography and the Civil War. New York: Oxford University Press. ISBN 978-0-19-535169-9. OCLC 57365391.
- Samuels, Shirley, ed. (2007). A Companion to American Fiction 1780-1865. John Wiley & Sons. ISBN 978-0-470-99920-2
- Samuels, Shirley (1996). Romances of the republic: women, the family, and violence in the literature of the early American nation. New York: Oxford University Press. ISBN 1-4237-6490-0. OCLC 65222754.
- Samuels, Shirley, ed. (1992). The Culture of sentiment: Race, gender, and sentimentality in nineteenth-century America. Oxford University Press ISBN 978-1-4237-6428-1
