= William Wells Brown =

African-American abolitionist (1814–1884)

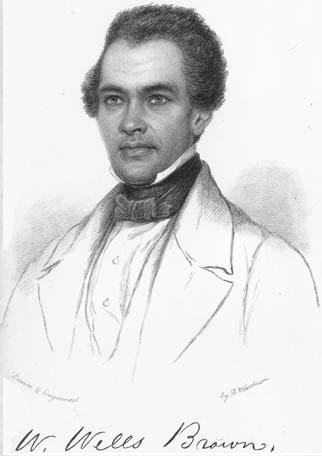
- Born: November 6, 1814; Lexington, Kentucky, U.S.
- Died: November 6, 1884 (aged 70); Chelsea, Massachusetts, U.S.
- Occupations: Abolitionist; writer; historian; comedian
- Notable work: Clotel (1853), the first novel written by an African American
- Spouses: Elizabeth "Betsey" Schooner (m. 1834; died 1851); Anna Elizabeth Gray (m. 1860)
- Children: 5, including Josephine
- Relatives: Joe Brown (brother)

William Wells Brown (November 6, 1814 – November 6, 1884) was an American abolitionist, novelist, playwright, and historian. Born into slavery near Mount Sterling, Kentucky, Brown escaped to Ohio in 1834 at the age of 19. He settled in Boston, Massachusetts, where he worked for abolitionist causes and became a prolific writer. While working for abolition, Brown also supported causes including: temperance, women's suffrage, pacifism, prison reform, and an anti-tobacco movement. He was a member of Prince Hall Freemasonry. His novel Clotel (1853), considered the first novel written by an African American, was published in London, England, where he resided at the time. It was later published in the United States.

Brown was a pioneer in several different literary genres, including travel writing, fiction, and drama. In 1858 he became the first published African-American playwright, and often read from this work on the lecture circuit. Following the Civil War, in 1867 he published what is considered the first history of African Americans in the Revolutionary War. He was among the first writers inducted to the Kentucky Writers Hall of Fame, established in 2013. A public school was named for him in Lexington, Kentucky.

Brown was lecturing in England when the 1850 Fugitive Slave Law was passed in the US. As its provisions increased the risk of his capture and re-enslavement, even in northern states, he stayed overseas for several years. He traveled throughout Europe. After his freedom was purchased in 1854 by a British couple, he and his two daughters returned to the US, where he rejoined the abolitionist lecture circuit in the North. A contemporary of Frederick Douglass, Brown was overshadowed by the charismatic orator and the two feuded publicly.

== Life in slavery ==
William was born into slavery in 1814 (or March 15, 1815) near Lexington, Kentucky, where his mother Elizabeth was enslaved by Dr. John Young. She had seven children, each by different fathers: William, Solomon, Leander, Benjamin, Joseph, Milford, and Elizabeth.

William was of mixed race; his father was George W. Higgins, a white planter and cousin of his enslaver, Dr. Young. Higgins formally acknowledged William as his son and made Young promise not to sell him. But Young did sell the boy and his mother. In the end, William was sold several times before he was twenty years old.

His brother Joseph has been identified by researchers Ron L. Jackson Jr. and Lee Spencer White as Joe, the slave of Alamo commander William B. Travis. Joe was one of the few survivors of the battle.

William spent the majority of his youth in St. Louis. His masters hired him out to work on steamboats on the Missouri River, then a major thoroughfare for steamships and the slave trade. His work allowed him to see many new places. In 1833, he and his mother escaped together across the Mississippi River, but they were captured in Illinois. In 1834, Brown made a second escape attempt, successfully slipping away from a steamboat when it docked in Cincinnati, Ohio, a free state.

Readable pdf of The black man - his antecedents, his genius, and his achievements, published for James M. Symms & Co.

In freedom, he took the names of Wells Brown, a Quaker friend who helped him after his escape by providing food, clothes and some money. He learned to read and write, and eagerly sought more education, reading extensively to make up for what he had been deprived. Around this time he was hired by Elijah Parish Lovejoy and worked with the famed abolitionist in his printing office.

== Marriage and family ==
During his first year of freedom in 1834, Brown at age 20 married Elizabeth Schooner. They had two daughters who survived to adulthood: Clarissa and Josephine. William and Elizabeth later became estranged. In 1851, Elizabeth died in the United States.

Brown had been in England since 1849 with his daughters, lecturing on the abolitionist circuit. After his freedom was purchased in 1854 by a British couple, Brown returned with his daughters to the US, settling in Boston. On April 12, 1860, the 46-year-old Brown married again, to 25-year-old Anna Elizabeth Gray in Boston.

In 1856, Well's daughter Josephine Brown published Biography of an American Bondman (1856), an updated account of his life. She drew extensively on material from her father's 1847 autobiography. She added details about abuses he had suffered as a slave, as well as new material about his years in Europe.

== Move to New York ==
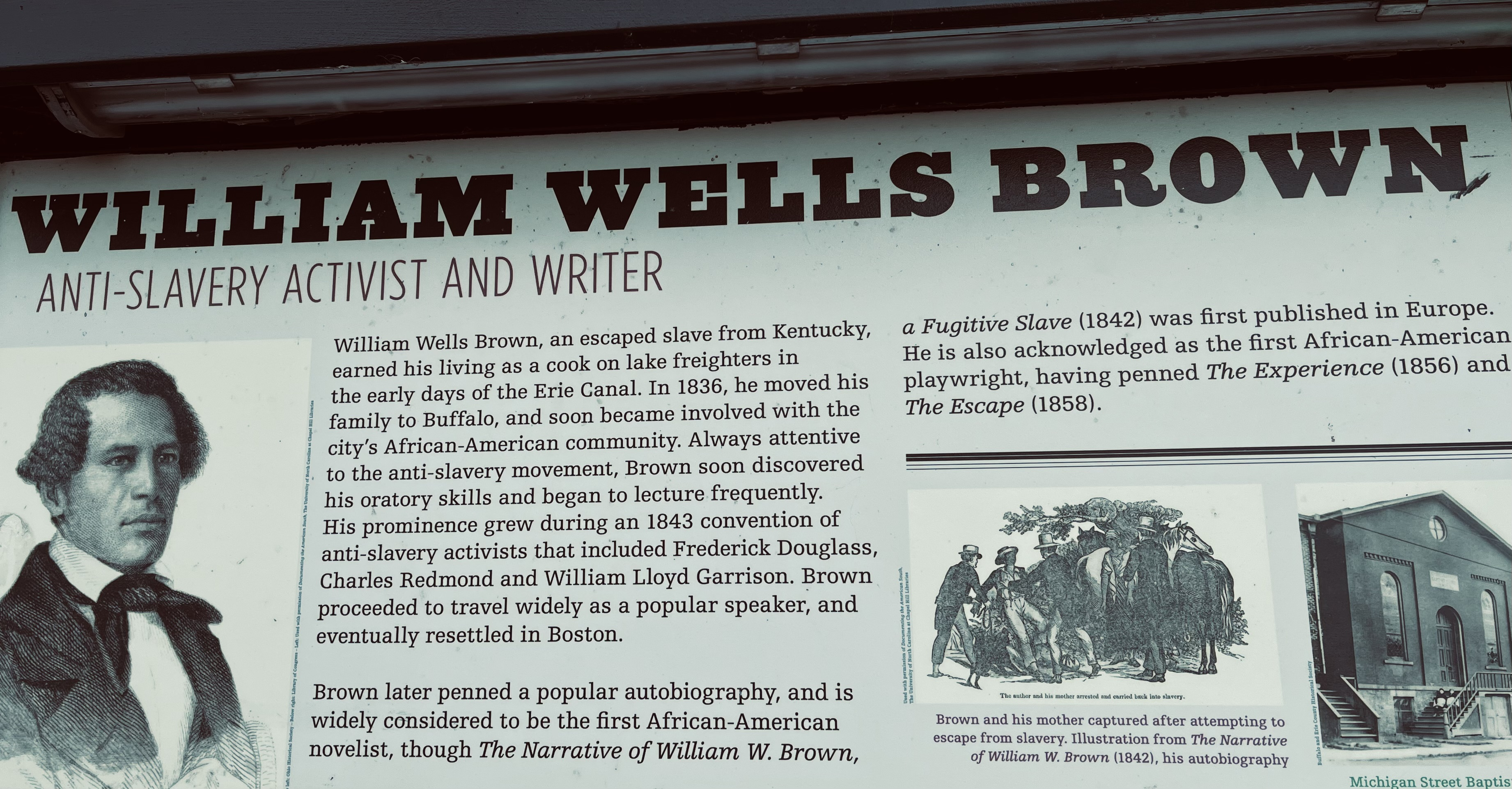
William Wells Brown signage highlights his life and achievements in Buffalo NY including his aid to many freedom seekers. The location in Canalside, the waterfront park, is the site of Brown's home.

From 1836 to about 1845, Brown made his home in Buffalo, New York, where he worked as a steamboat man on Lake Erie. He helped many fugitive slaves gain their freedom by hiding them on the boat to take them to Buffalo, or Detroit, Michigan, or across the lake to Canada. He later wrote that during the seven-month period of time from May to December 1842, he had helped 69 fugitives reach Canada. Brown became active in the abolitionist movement in Buffalo by joining several anti-slavery societies and the Colored Conventions Movement. Brown's work in anti-slavery societies often included public speaking, and he frequently used music as part of his performance. Brown's use of music in his speeches emphasizes music's role in the anti-slavery movement of the 1840s. He "traveled with a slavery-themed travelling panorama". While living in Buffalo, Brown also organized a Temperance Society, which quickly gained 500 members. At the time there were only 700 black people living in Buffalo.

== Years in Europe ==
In 1849, Brown left the United States with his two young daughters to travel in the British Isles to lecture against slavery. He wanted them to gain the education he had been denied. He was also traveling that year as a representative of the US at the International Peace Congress in Paris. Given passage of the Fugitive Slave Act of 1850 in the US, which increased penalties and more severely enforced capture of fugitive slaves, he chose to stay in England until 1854. That year his freedom was purchased by British friends. As a highly visible public figure in the US, he was at risk for capture as a fugitive and re-enslavement. Slave catchers were paid high bounties to return slaves to their owners, and the new law required enforcement even by free states and their citizens, although many resisted.

Brown lectured widely to antislavery circuits in the UK to build support for the US movement. He often showed a metal slave collar as demonstration of the institution's evils. An article in the Scotch Independent reported the following:

By dint of resolution, self-culture, and force of character, he [Brown] has rendered himself a popular lecturer to a British audience, and vigorous expositor of the evils and atrocities of that system whose chains he has shaken off so triumphantly and forever. We may safely pronounce William Wells Brown a remarkable man, and a full refutation of the doctrine of the inferiority of the negro.

Brown also used this time to learn more about the cultures, religions, and different concepts of European nations. He felt that he needed always to be learning, in order to catch up and live in a society where others had been given an education when young. In his 1852 memoir of travel in Europe, he wrote,

He who escapes from slavery at the age of twenty years, without any education, as did the writer of this letter, must read when others are asleep, if he would catch up with the rest of the world.

At the International Peace Conference in Paris, Brown faced opposition while representing the country that had enslaved him. Later he confronted American slaveholders on the grounds of the Crystal Palace.

Based on this journey, Brown wrote Three Years in Europe: or Places I Have Seen And People I Have Met. His travel account was popular with middle-class readers as he recounted sightseeing trips to the foundational monuments of European culture. In his Letter XIV, Brown wrote about his meeting with the Christian philosopher Thomas Dick in 1851.

=== Abolition orator and writer ===
After his return to the US, Brown gave lectures for the abolitionist movement in New York and Massachusetts. He soon focused on anti-slavery efforts. His speeches expressed his belief in the power of moral suasion and the importance of nonviolence. He often attacked the supposed American ideal of democracy and the use of religion to promote submissiveness among slaves. Brown constantly refuted the idea of black inferiority.

Due to his reputation as a powerful orator, Brown was invited to the National Convention of Colored Citizens, where he met other prominent abolitionists. When the Liberty Party formed, he chose to remain independent, believing that the abolitionist movement should avoid becoming entrenched in politics. He continued to support the Garrisonian approach to abolitionism. He shared his own experiences and insight into slavery in order to convince others to support the cause.

=== Literary works ===
In 1847, he published his memoir, the Narrative of William W. Brown, a Fugitive Slave, Written by Himself, which became a bestseller across the United States, second only to Frederick Douglass's slave narrative memoir. Brown critiques his master's lack of Christian values and the customary brutal use of violence by owners in master-slave relations.

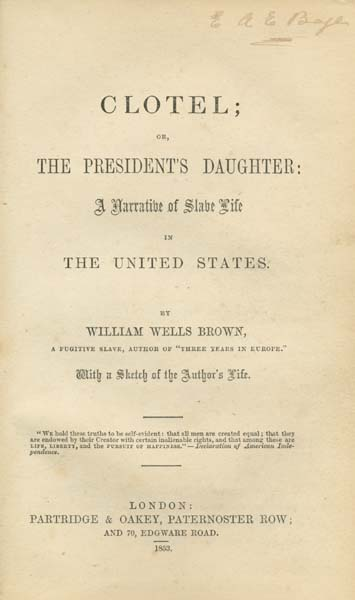
Clotel, or, The President's Daughter: A Narrative of Slave Life in the United States

When Brown lived in Britain, he wrote more works, including travel accounts and plays. His first novel, entitled Clotel, or, The President's Daughter: a Narrative of Slave Life in the United States, was published in London in 1853. It portrays the fictional plight of two mulatto (mixed-race) daughters born to Thomas Jefferson and one of his slaves. His novel is believed to be the first written by an African American.

Historically, Jefferson's household was known to include numerous mixed-race slaves, and there were rumors since the early 19th century that he had children with a slave, Sally Hemings. In 1826 Jefferson freed five mixed-race slaves in his will; most historians now believe that two brothers, Madison and Eston Hemings, were among his four surviving children from his long-term forced relationship with Sally Hemings.

As Brown's novel was first published in England and not until later in the United States, it is not the first novel by an African American published in the US. This credit goes to either Harriet Wilson's Our Nig (1859) or Julia C. Collins's The Curse of Caste; or The Slave Bride (1865).

Most scholars agree that Brown is the first published African-American playwright. Brown wrote two plays after his return to the US: Experience; or, How to Give a Northern Man a Backbone (1856, unpublished and no longer extant) and The Escape; or, A Leap for Freedom (1858). He read the latter aloud at abolitionist meetings in lieu of the typical lecture.

Brown continually struggled with how to represent slavery "as it was" to his audiences. For instance, in an 1847 lecture to the Female Anti-Slavery Society of Salem, Massachusetts, he said: "Were I about to tell you the evils of Slavery, to represent to you the Slave in his lowest degradation, I should wish to take you, one at a time, and whisper it to you. Slavery has never been represented; Slavery never can be represented."

Brown also wrote several histories, including: St. Domingo: Its Revolution and Its Patriots (1855), a history of the Haitian Revolution; The Black Man: His Antecedents, His Genius, and His Achievements (1863); The Negro in the American Rebellion (1867), considered the first historical work about black soldiers in the American Revolutionary War; and The Rising Son (1873). His last book was another memoir, My Southern Home (1880).

== Later life ==
Brown stayed abroad until 1854. Passage of the 1850 Fugitive Slave Law had increased his risk of capture even in the free states. Only after the Richardson family of Britain purchased his freedom in 1854 (they had done the same for Frederick Douglass), did Brown return to the United States. He quickly rejoined the anti-slavery lecture circuit.

Brown criticized Rev. Nehemiah Adams, whose book A South-Side View of Slavery covered slavery in a positive light.

Perhaps because of the rising social tensions in the 1850s, Brown became a proponent of African-American emigration to Haiti, an independent black republic in the Caribbean since 1804. In the fall of 1861, he toured the Black communities of Canada West on behalf of James Redpath's Haytian Bureau of Emigration, writing a series of articles, The Colored People of Canada, in its official journal, Pine and Palm.

During the American Civil War and in the decades that followed, Brown continued to publish fiction and non-fiction books, securing his reputation as one of the most prolific African-American writers of his time. He also helped recruit blacks to fight for the Union in the Civil War. He introduced Robert John Simmons from Bermuda to the abolitionist Francis George Shaw, father of Colonel Robert Gould Shaw, the commanding officer of the 54th Massachusetts Volunteer Infantry Regiment.

While continuing to write, Brown was active in the Temperance movement as a lecturer. After studying homeopathic medicine, he opened a medical practice in Boston's South End while keeping a residence in Cambridge, Massachusetts. In 1882 he moved to the nearby city of Chelsea.

William Wells Brown died on November 6, 1884, at his home in Chelsea, Massachusetts, at the age of 70.

== Legacy and honors ==
- He is the first African American to publish a novel with Clotel, or, The President's Daughter: a Narrative of Slave Life in the United States, in 1853 in London (Harriet Wilson's Our Nig, published in 1859, is the first novel published by an African American in the United States).
- An elementary school in Lexington, Kentucky, where he spent his early years, is named after him.
- He was among the first writers inducted to the Kentucky Writers Hall of Fame.
- A historic marker marks the approximate location of his home in Buffalo
- Wells's portrait by Buffalo, N.Y.-based artist Edreys Wajed is one of 28 civil rights icons depicted on the Freedom Wall, commissioned by the Albright-Knox Art Gallery, completed in September 2017.
- A portrait of Wells is housed in the Schomburg Center for Research in Black Culture, Photographs and Prints Division. The Schomburg center also holds some of Wells' literature including his autobiography Narrative of William W. Brown, An American Slave.

== Writings ==
- Narrative of William W. Brown, a Fugitive Slave. Written by Himself, Boston: The Anti-slavery office, 1847.
- Narrative of William W. Brown, an American Slave. Written by Himself, London: C. Gilpin, 1849.
- Three Years in Europe: Or, Places I Have Seen and People I Have Met. London: Charles Gilpin, 1852.
- Brown, William Wells (1815–1884). Three Years in Europe, or Places I Have Seen and People I Have Met. with a Memoir of the author. 1852.
- William Wells Brown, CLOTEL; or the President's Daughter (1853), An Electronic Scholarly Edition, edited by Professor Christopher Mulvey
- St. Domingo: Its Revolution and Its Patriots. Boston: Bela Marsh, 1855
- The American Fugitive in Europe. Sketches of Places and People Abroad. Boston: John P. Jewett, 1855.
- The Black Man: His Antecedents, His Genius, and His Achievements. New York: Thomas Hamilton; Boston: R.F. Wallcut, 1863.
- The Rising Son, or The Antecedents and Advancements of the Colored Race. Boston: A. G. Brown & Co., 1873.
- My Southern Home: or, The South and Its People, Boston: A. G. Brown & Co., Publishers, 1880.
- The Negro in the American Rebellion; His Heroism and His Fidelity ...
