= Black people =

Racial classification of people

Black is a racial classification of people, a skin color-based category for specific populations with a mid- to dark brown complexion. Often in countries with socially based systems of racial classification in the Western world, the term "black" is used to describe persons who are perceived as darker-skinned in contrast to other populations. It is most commonly used for people of African ancestry, Indigenous Australians, Melanesians, and Negritos, though it has been applied in many contexts to other groups, and is no indicator of any close ancestral relationship whatsoever. However, not all people considered "black" have dark skin and often additional phenotypical characteristics are relevant, such as certain facial and hair-texture features. Indigenous African societies do not use the term black as a racial identity outside of influences brought by Western cultures.

Contemporary anthropologists and other scientists, while recognizing the reality of biological variation among different human populations, regard the concept of a "black race" as social construct. Different societies apply different criteria regarding who is classified "black", and these social constructs have changed over time. In a number of countries, societal variables affect classification as much as skin color, and the social criteria for "blackness" vary. Some perceive the term 'black' as a derogatory, outdated, reductive or otherwise unrepresentative label, and as a result neither use nor define it, especially in African countries with little to no history of colonial racial segregation.

In the anglosphere, the term can carry a variety of meanings depending on the country. While the term "person of color" is commonly used and accepted in the United States, the near-sounding term "colored person" is considered highly offensive, except in South Africa, where Coloureds are a specific multiracial group. In other regions such as Australia and Melanesia, settlers applied the adjective "black" to the indigenous population. It was universally regarded as highly offensive in Australia until the 1960s and 1970s. "Black" was generally not used as a noun, but rather as an adjective qualifying some other descriptor. As desegregation progressed after the 1967 referendum, some Indigenous Australians adopted the term, following the American fashion, but it remains problematic.

Several American style guides, including the AP Stylebook, changed their guides to capitalize the 'b' in 'black', following the 2020 murder of George Floyd, an African American. However, the ASA Style Guide says that the 'b' should not be capitalized due to the fact that racial descriptors are treated as adjectives rather than proper nouns.

== Africa ==
=== Northern Africa ===
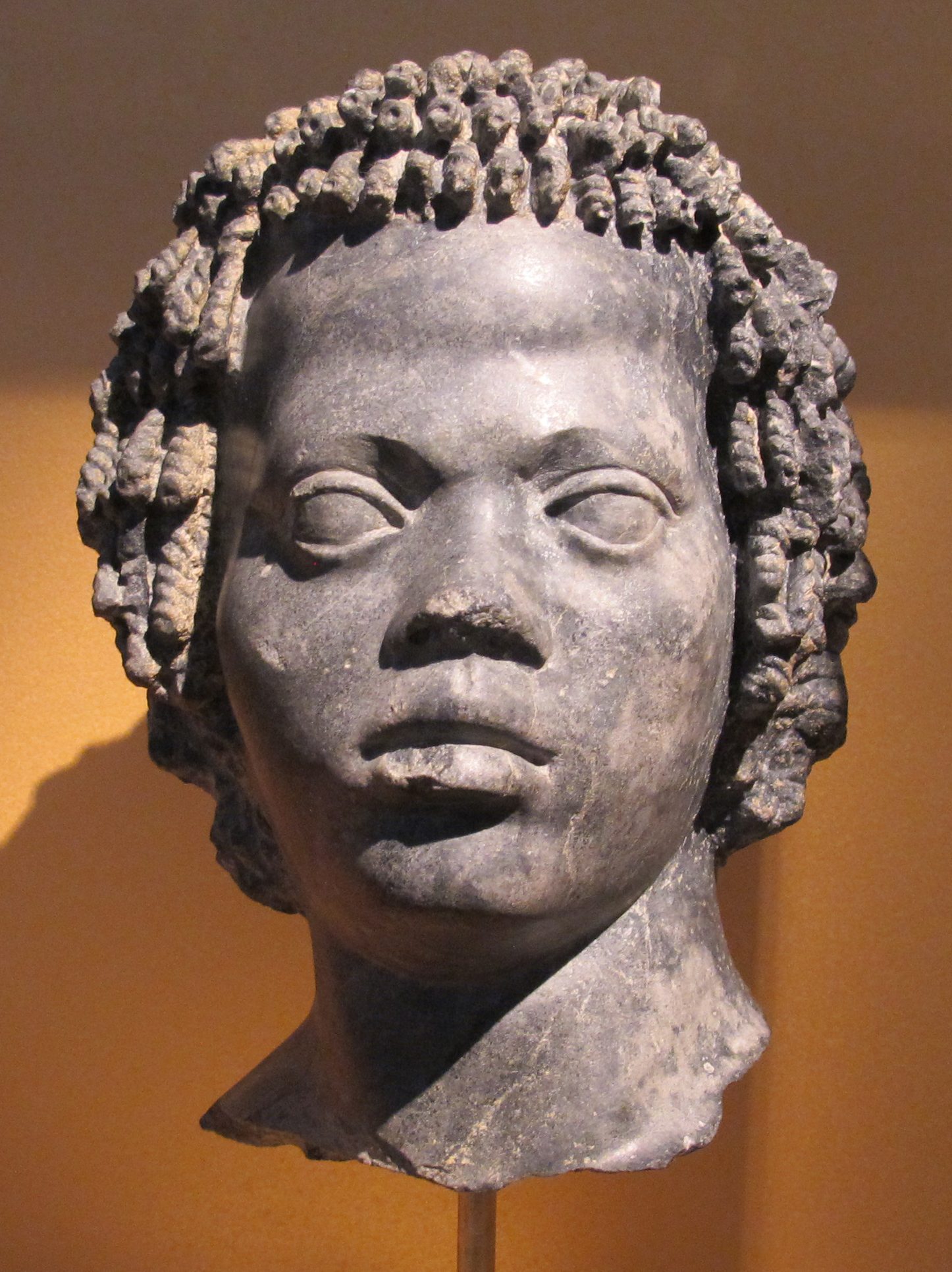
Marble portrait of a Nubian man c. 120–100 BC.

Numerous communities of dark-skinned peoples are present in North Africa, some dating from prehistoric communities. Others descend from migrants via the historical trans-Saharan trade or, after the Arab invasions of North Africa in the 7th century, from slaves from the trans-Saharan slave trade in North Africa.

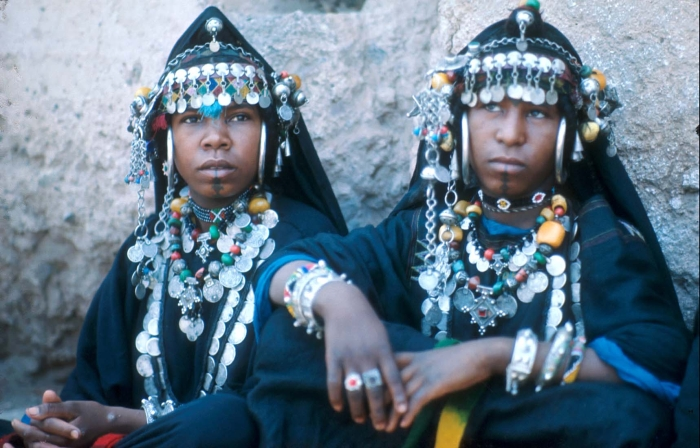
Haratin women, a community residing in the Maghreb (Northwest Africa)

In the 18th century, the Moroccan Sultan Moulay Ismail "the Warrior King" (1672–1727) raised a corps of 150,000 black soldiers, called his Black Guard.

Notable Islamic caliphs with African ancestry include Abu al-Misk Kafur Al-Mustansir Billah, Yaqub al-Mansur, Abu al-Hasan Ali ibn Othman, Sultan of the Marinid dynasty and Moulay Ismail Ibn Sharif.

According to Carlos Moore, resident scholar at Brazil's University of the State of Bahia, in the 21st century Afro-multiracials in the Arab world, including Arabs in North Africa, self-identify in ways that resemble multi-racials in Latin America. He claims that darker-toned Arabs, much like darker-toned Latin Americans, consider themselves white because they have some distant white ancestry.

Egyptian president Anwar Sadat had a mother who was a dark-skinned Nubian Sudanese (Sudanese Arab) woman and a father who was a lighter-skinned Egyptian. In response to an advertisement for an acting position, as a young man he said, "I am not white but I am not exactly black either. My blackness is tending to reddish".

Due to the patriarchal nature of Arab society, Arab men, including during the slave trade in North Africa, enslaved more African women than men. The female slaves were often put to work in domestic service and agriculture. The men interpreted the Quran to permit sexual relations between a male master and his enslaved females outside of marriage (see Ma malakat aymanukum and sex), leading to many mixed-race children. When an enslaved woman became pregnant with her Arab master's child, she was considered as umm walad or "mother of a child", a status that granted her privileged rights. The child was given rights of inheritance to the father's property, so mixed-race children could share in any wealth of the father. Because the society was patrilineal, the children inherited their fathers' social status at birth and were born free.

Some mixed-race children succeeded their respective fathers as rulers, such as Sultan Ahmad al-Mansur, who ruled Morocco from 1578 to 1608. He was not technically considered as a mixed-race child of a slave; his mother was Fulani and a concubine of his father.

In early 1991, non-Arabs of the Zaghawa people of Sudan attested that they were victims of an intensifying Arab apartheid campaign, segregating Arabs and non-Arabs (specifically, people of Nilotic ancestry). Sudanese Arabs, who controlled the government, were widely referred to as practicing apartheid against Sudan's non-Arab citizens. The government was accused of "deftly manipulating Arab solidarity" to carry out policies of apartheid and ethnic cleansing.

Sudanese Arabs are also black people in that they are culturally and linguistically Arabized indigenous peoples of Sudan of mostly Nilo-Saharan, Nubian, and Cushitic ancestry; their skin tone and appearance resembles that of other black people.

American University economist George Ayittey accused the Arab government of Sudan of practicing acts of racism against black citizens. According to Ayittey, "In Sudan... the Arabs monopolized power and excluded blacks – Arab apartheid." Many African commentators joined Ayittey in accusing Sudan of practicing Arab apartheid.

==== Sahara ====
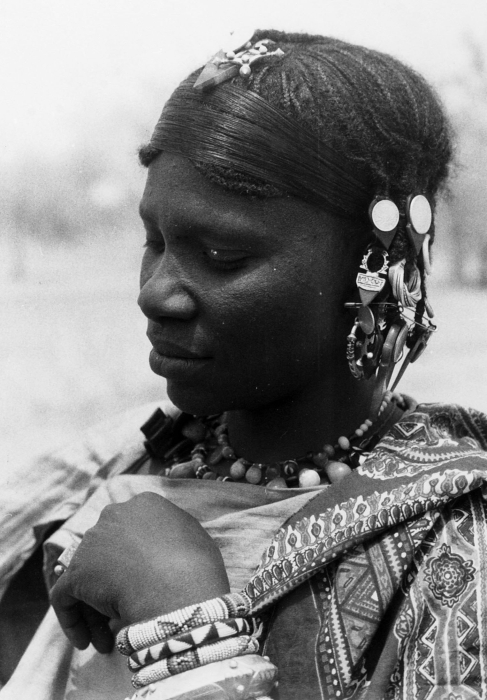
An Ibenheren (Bella) woman

The Tuareg people have in the past had a highly socially stratified society, with specific social roles (warriors, religious leaders) or professions (blacksmiths, farmers, merchants) assigned to specific castes. The tiny aristocratic caste of warrior elite which once sat atop a pyramid of Tuareg society was decimated during the wars of the colonial period, and this, along with economic necessity, post-colonial border restrictions, and modern education, have broken down many traditional caste barriers.

Tuareg higher caste traditions value a nomadic life, warfare, study, animal husbandry, and trade. Consequently, higher caste communities travel, at least seasonally, if able. Lower caste groups, not limited to the Ikelan, are more likely to live in settled communities, either in Sahara oasis towns or in villages scattered among other ethnic groups in the Sahel region to the south.

=== Horn of Africa ===
In Ethiopia and Somalia, the slave classes mainly consisted of captured peoples from the Sudanese-Ethiopian and Kenyan-Somali international borders or other surrounding areas of Nilotic and Bantu peoples who were collectively known as Shanqella and Adone (both analogues to "negro" in an English-speaking context). Some of these slaves were captured during territorial conflicts in the Horn of Africa and then sold off to slave merchants. The earliest representation of this tradition dates from a seventh or eighth century BC inscription belonging to the Kingdom of Damat.

These captives and others of analogous morphology were distinguished as tsalim barya (dark-skinned slave) in contrast with the Afroasiatic-speaking nobles or saba qayh ("red men") or light-skinned slave; while on the other hand, western racial category standards do not differentiate between saba qayh ("red men"—light-skinned) or saba tiqur ("black men"—dark-skinned) Horn Africans (of either Afroasiatic-speaking, Nilotic-speaking or Bantu origin) thus considering all of them as "black people" (and in some case "negro") according to Western society's notion of race.

=== Southern Africa ===
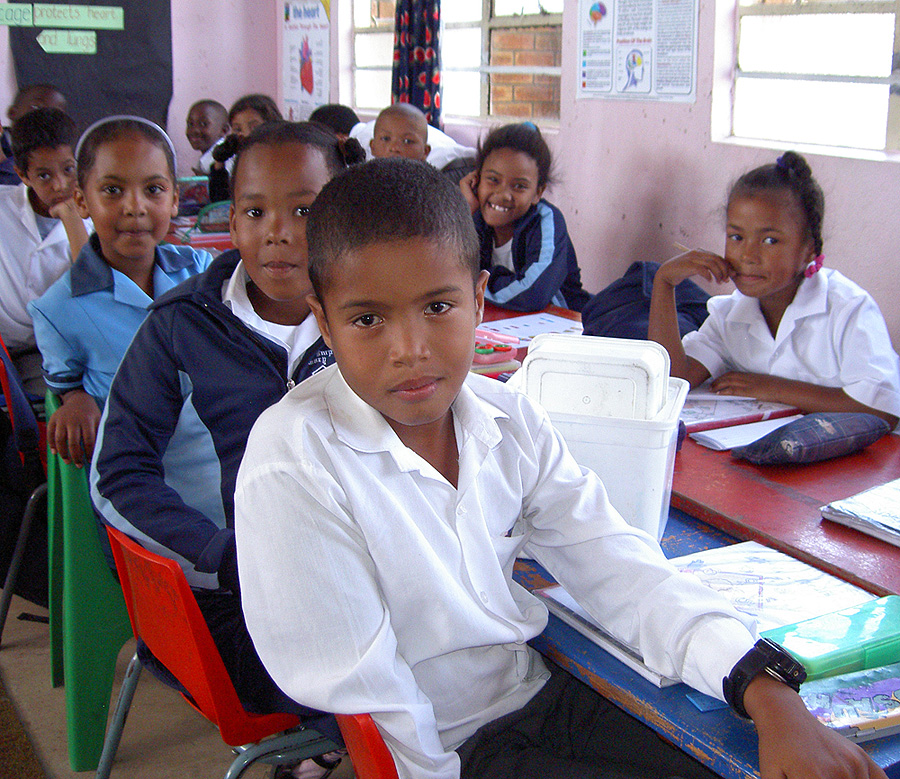
Cape Coloured school children of South Africa

In South Africa, the period of colonisation resulted in many unions and marriages between European and Africans (Bantu peoples of South Africa and Khoisans) from various tribes, resulting in mixed-race children. As the European colonialists acquired control of territory, they generally pushed the mixed-race and African populations into second-class status. During the first half of the 20th century, the white-dominated government classified the population according to four main racial groups: Black, White, Asian (mostly Indian), and Coloured. The Coloured group included people of mixed Bantu, Khoisan, and European ancestry (with some Malay ancestry, especially in the Western Cape). The Coloured definition occupied an intermediary political position between the Black and White definitions in South Africa. It imposed a system of legal racial segregation, a complex of laws known as apartheid.

The apartheid bureaucracy devised complex (and often arbitrary) criteria in the Population Registration Act of 1945 to determine who belonged in which group. Minor officials administered tests to enforce the classifications. When it was unclear from a person's physical appearance whether the individual should be considered Coloured or Black, the "pencil test" was used. A pencil was inserted into a person's hair to determine if the hair was kinky enough to hold the pencil, rather than having it pass through, as it would with smoother hair. If so, the person was classified as Black. Such classifications sometimes divided families.

Sandra Laing is a South African woman who was classified as Coloured by authorities during the apartheid era, due to her skin colour and hair texture, although her parents could prove at least three generations of European ancestors. At age 10, she was expelled from her all-white school. The officials' decisions based on her anomalous appearance disrupted her family and adult life. She was the subject of the 2008 biographical dramatic film Skin, which won numerous awards. During the apartheid era, those classed as "Coloured" were oppressed and discriminated against. But, they had limited rights and overall had slightly better socioeconomic conditions than those classed as "Black". The government required that Blacks and Coloureds live in areas separate from Whites, creating large townships located away from the cities as areas for Blacks.

In the post-apartheid era, the Constitution of South Africa has declared the country to be a "Non-racial democracy". In an effort to redress past injustices, the ANC government has introduced laws in support of affirmative action policies for Blacks; under these they define "Black" people to include "Africans", "Coloureds" and "Asians". Some affirmative action policies favor "Africans" over "Coloureds" in terms of qualifying for certain benefits. Some South Africans categorized as "African Black" say that "Coloureds" did not suffer as much as they did during apartheid. "Coloured" South Africans are known to discuss their dilemma by saying, "we were not white enough under apartheid, and we are not black enough under the ANC (African National Congress)".

In 2008, the High Court in South Africa ruled that Chinese South Africans who were residents during the apartheid era (and their descendants) are to be reclassified as "Black people", solely for the purposes of accessing affirmative action benefits, because they were also "disadvantaged" by racial discrimination. Chinese people who arrived in the country after the end of apartheid do not qualify for such benefits.

Other than by appearance, "Coloureds" can usually be distinguished from "Blacks" by language. Most speak Afrikaans or English as a first language, as opposed to Bantu languages such as Zulu or Xhosa. They also tend to have more European-sounding names than Bantu names.

== Asia ==
=== Afro-Asians ===
"Afro-Asians" or "African-Asians" are persons of mixed African and Asian ancestry. In the United States, they are also called "black Asians" or "Blasians". Historically, Afro-Asian populations have been marginalized as a result of human migration and social conflict.

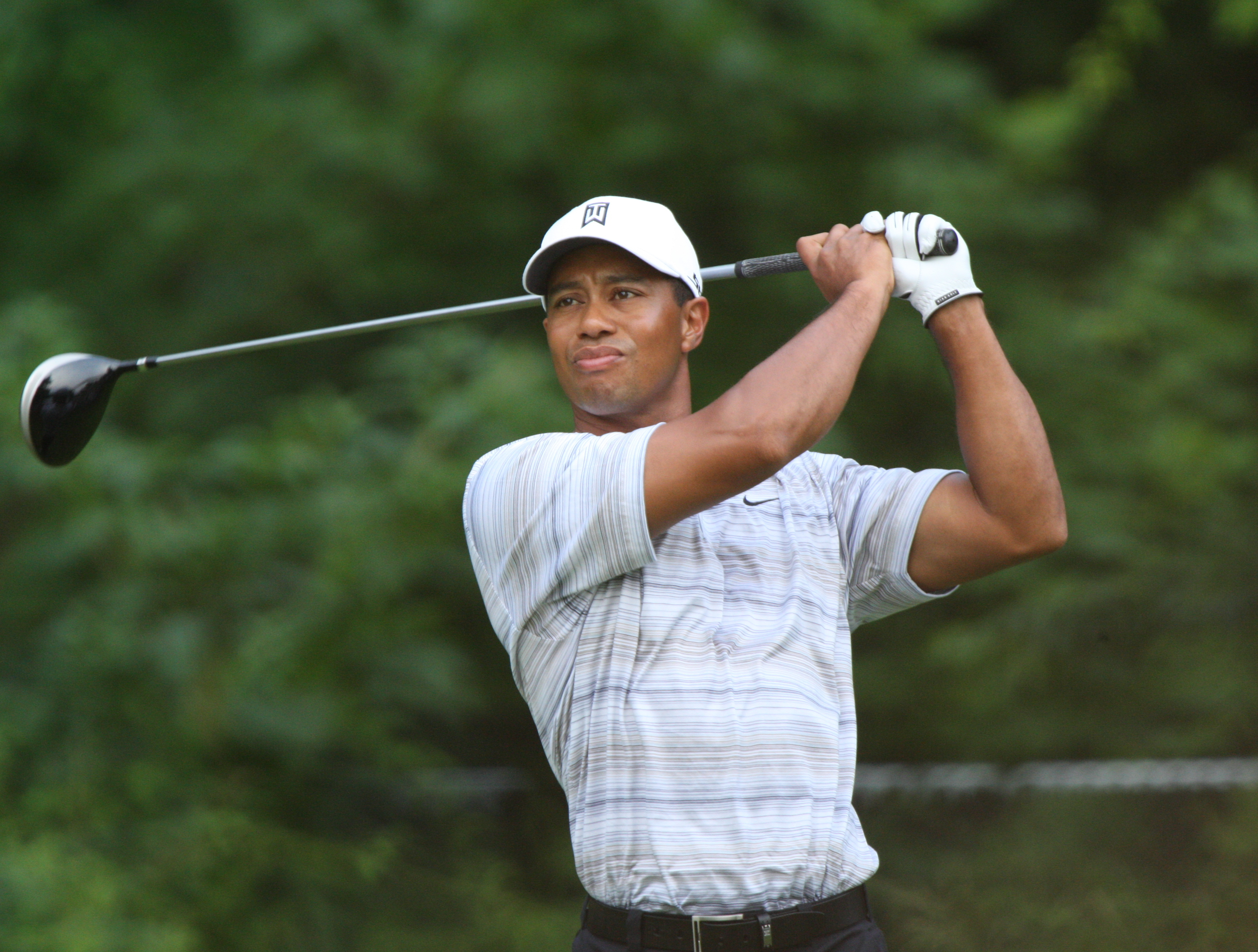
Tiger Woods, of African American and Thai heritage

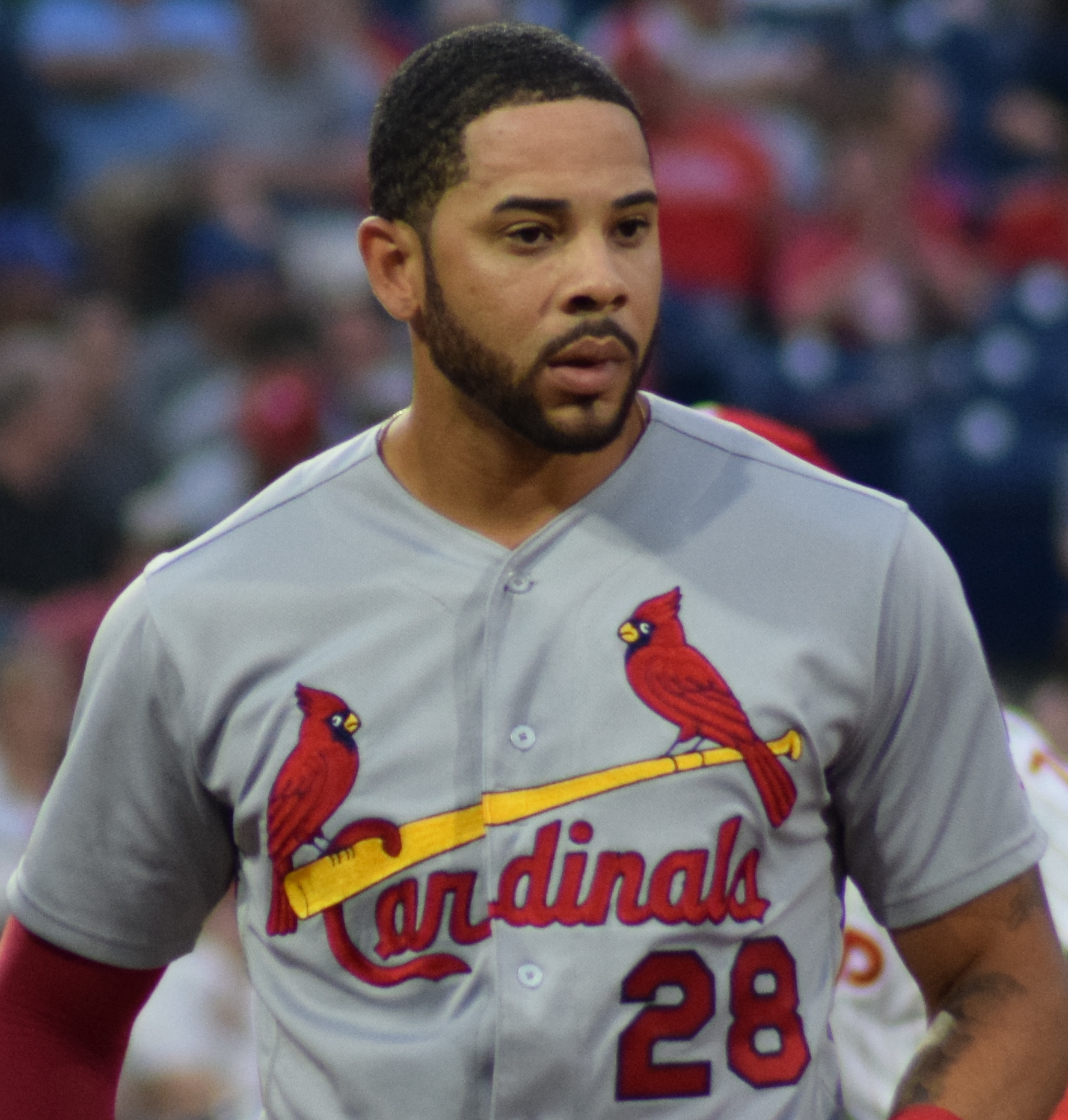
Tommy Pham is of African-American and Vietnamese descent.

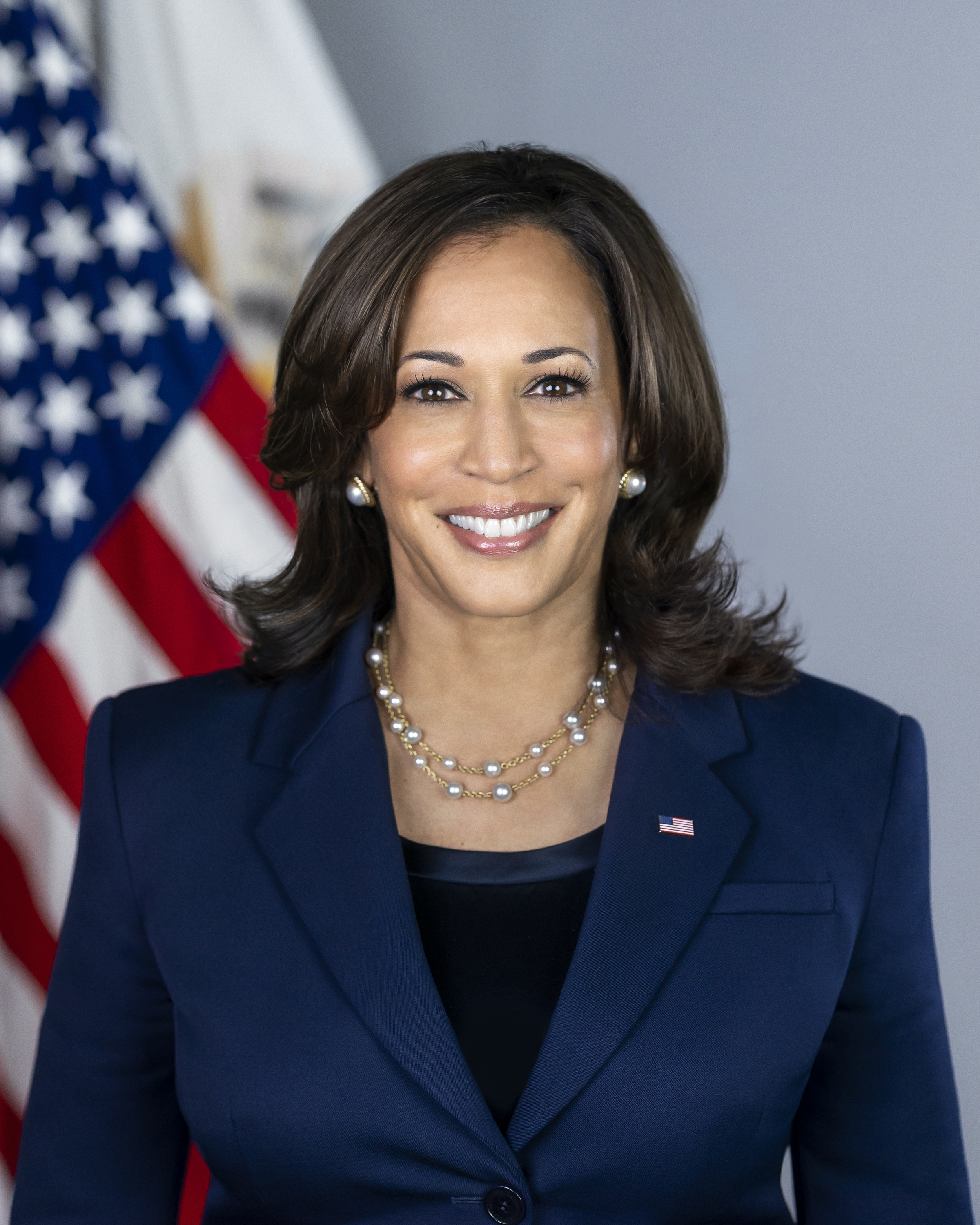
Former Vice President of the United States and former presidential candidate Kamala Harris is of Indian and Afro-Jamaican descent

=== Western Asia ===
==== Arab world ====
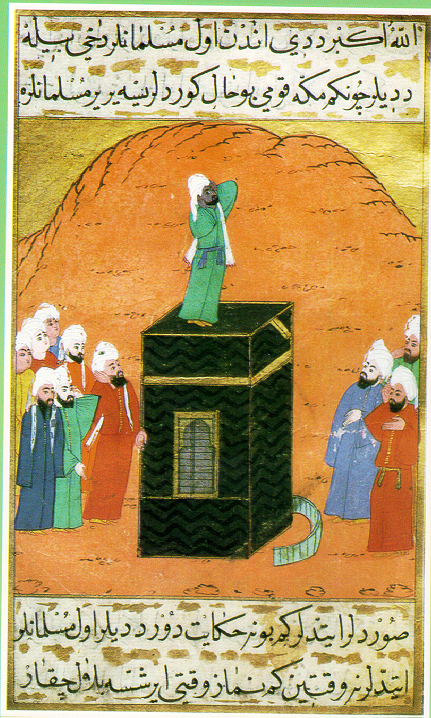
Bilal ibn Ribah (pictured atop the Kaaba, Mecca) was a former Ethiopian slave and the first muezzin, c. 630.

In the medieval Arab world, the ethnic designation of "Black" encompassed not only Zanj, or Africans, but also communities like Zutt, Sindis and Indians from the Indian subcontinent. Historians estimate that between the advent of Islam in 650 CE and the abolition of slavery in the Arabian Peninsula in the mid-20th century, 10 to 18 million black Africans (known as the Zanj) were enslaved by east African slave traders and transported to the Arabian Peninsula and neighboring countries. This number far exceeded the number of slaves who were taken to the Americas. Slavery in Saudi Arabia and slavery in Yemen was abolished in 1962, slavery in Dubai in 1963, and slavery in Oman in 1970.

Several factors affected the visibility of descendants of this diaspora in 21st-century Arab societies: The traders shipped more female slaves than males, as there was a demand for them to serve as concubines in harems in the Arabian Peninsula and neighboring countries. Male slaves were castrated in order to serve as harem guards. The death toll of black African slaves from forced labor was high. The mixed-race children of female slaves and Arab owners were assimilated into the Arab owners' families under the patrilineal kinship system. As a result, few distinctive Afro-Arab communities have survived in the Arabian Peninsula and neighboring countries.

Distinctive and self-identified black communities have been reported in countries such as Iraq, with a reported 1.2 million black people (Afro-Iraqis), and they attest to a history of discrimination. These descendants of the Zanj have sought minority status from the government, which would reserve some seats in Parliament for representatives of their population. According to Alamin M. Mazrui et al., generally in the Arabian Peninsula and neighboring countries, most of these communities identify as both black and Arab.

==== Iran ====
Afro-Iranians are people of black African ancestry residing in Iran. During the Qajar dynasty, many wealthy households imported black African women and children as slaves to perform domestic work. This slave labor was drawn exclusively from the Zanj, who were Bantu-speaking peoples that lived along the African Great Lakes, in an area roughly comprising modern-day Tanzania, Mozambique and Malawi.

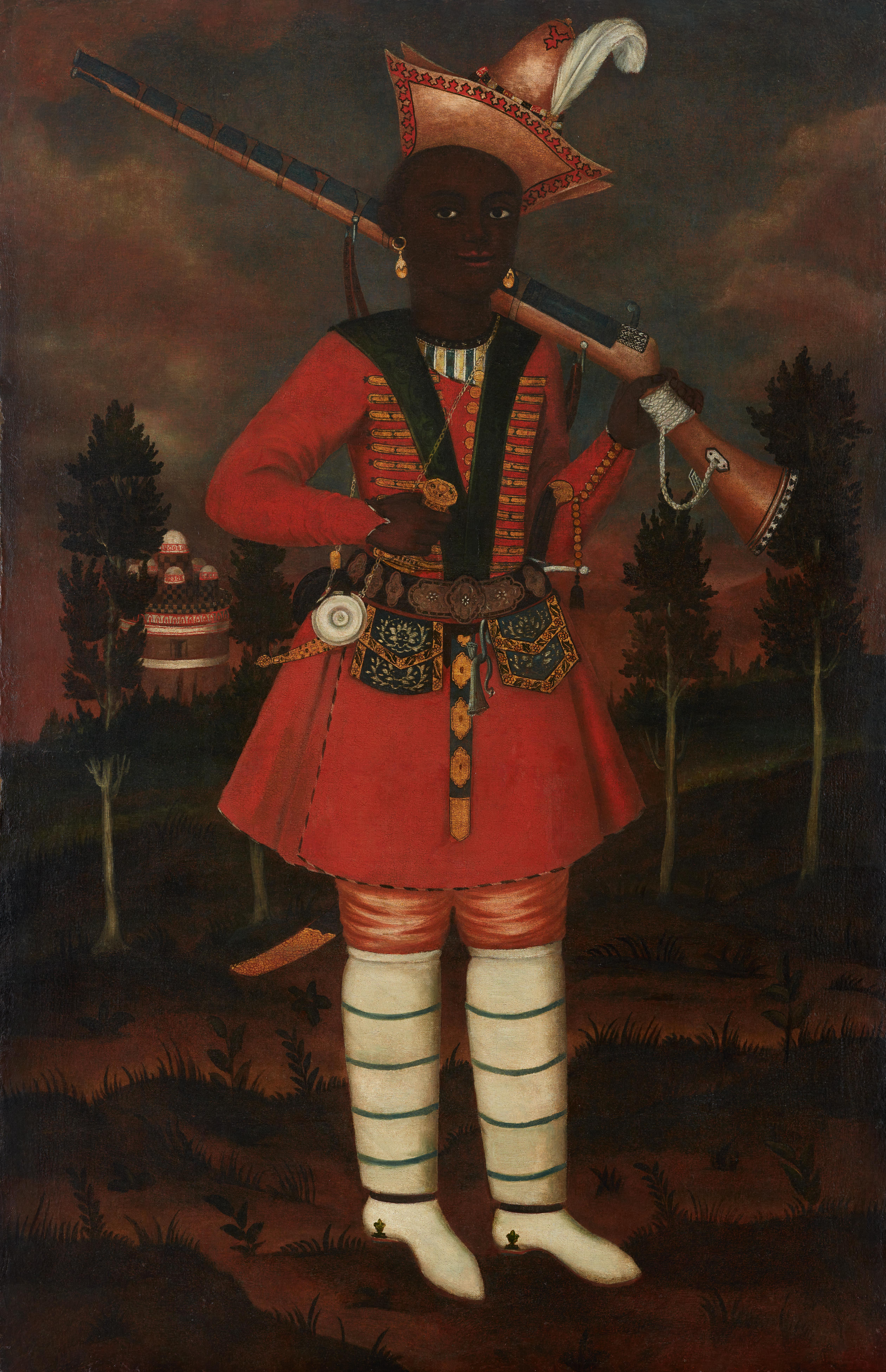
A Safavid oil painting of an African soldier in Safavid Iran, last quarter of the 17th century.

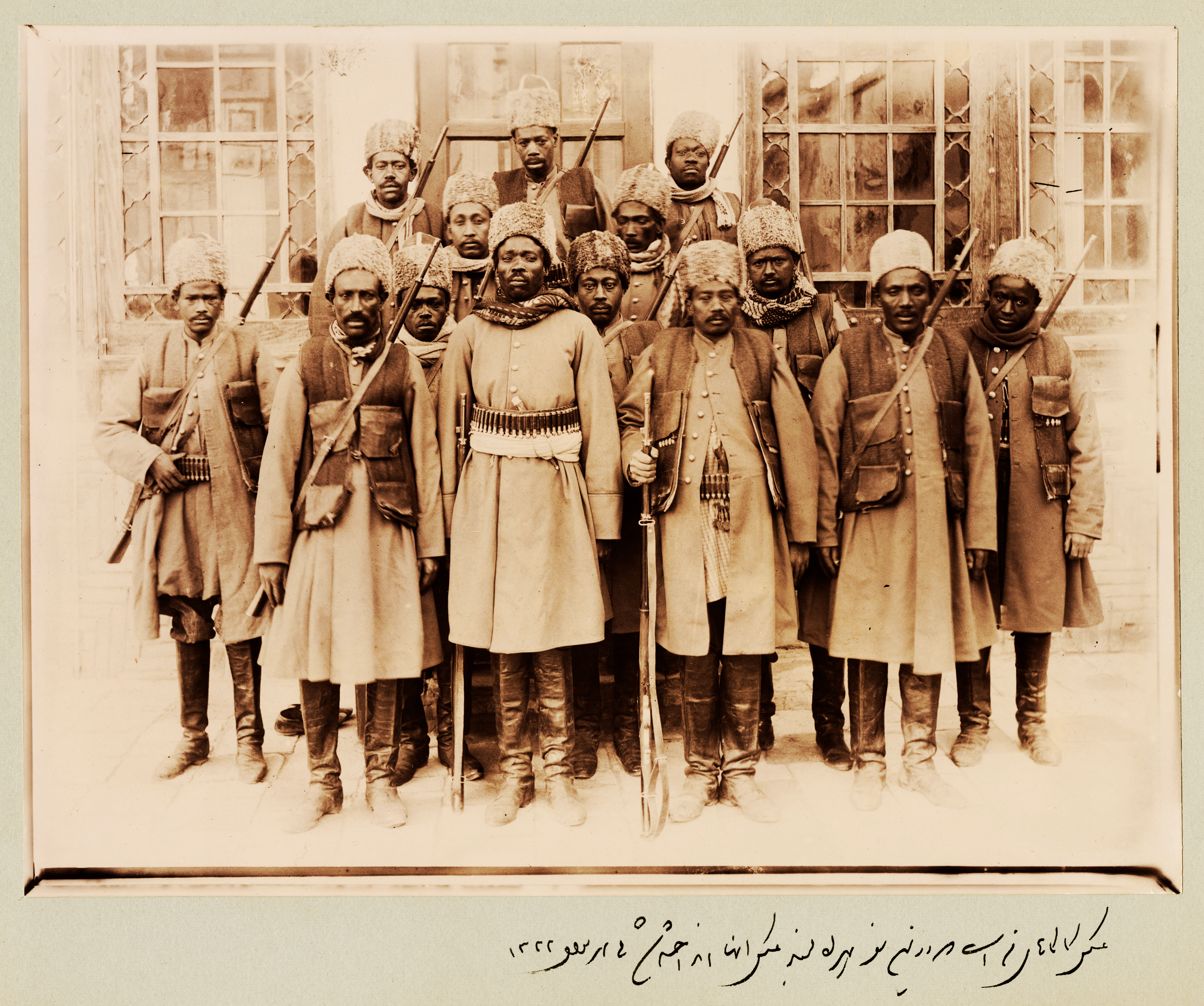
Non-eunuch slaves were sometimes assigned to the Qajar elite armies. The 14 slaves in this photo belonged to Prince Zell-e Soltan of Qajar, Ghameshlou, Isfahan, 1904[15].

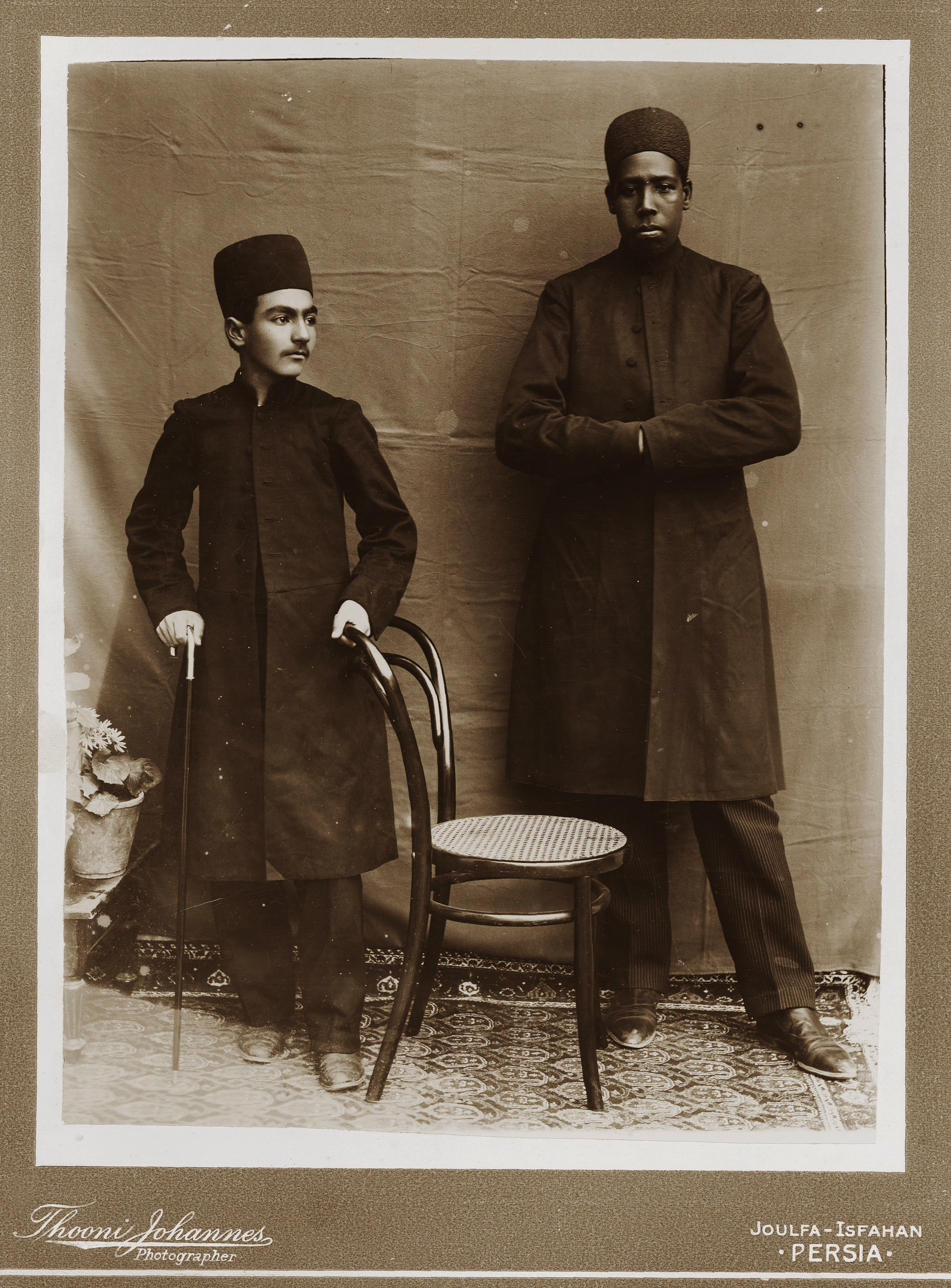
Gholam Hoseyn Mirza Masoud, one of Zell-e-Soltan’s sons, with his personal African slave, Julfa, Isfahan, 1880s

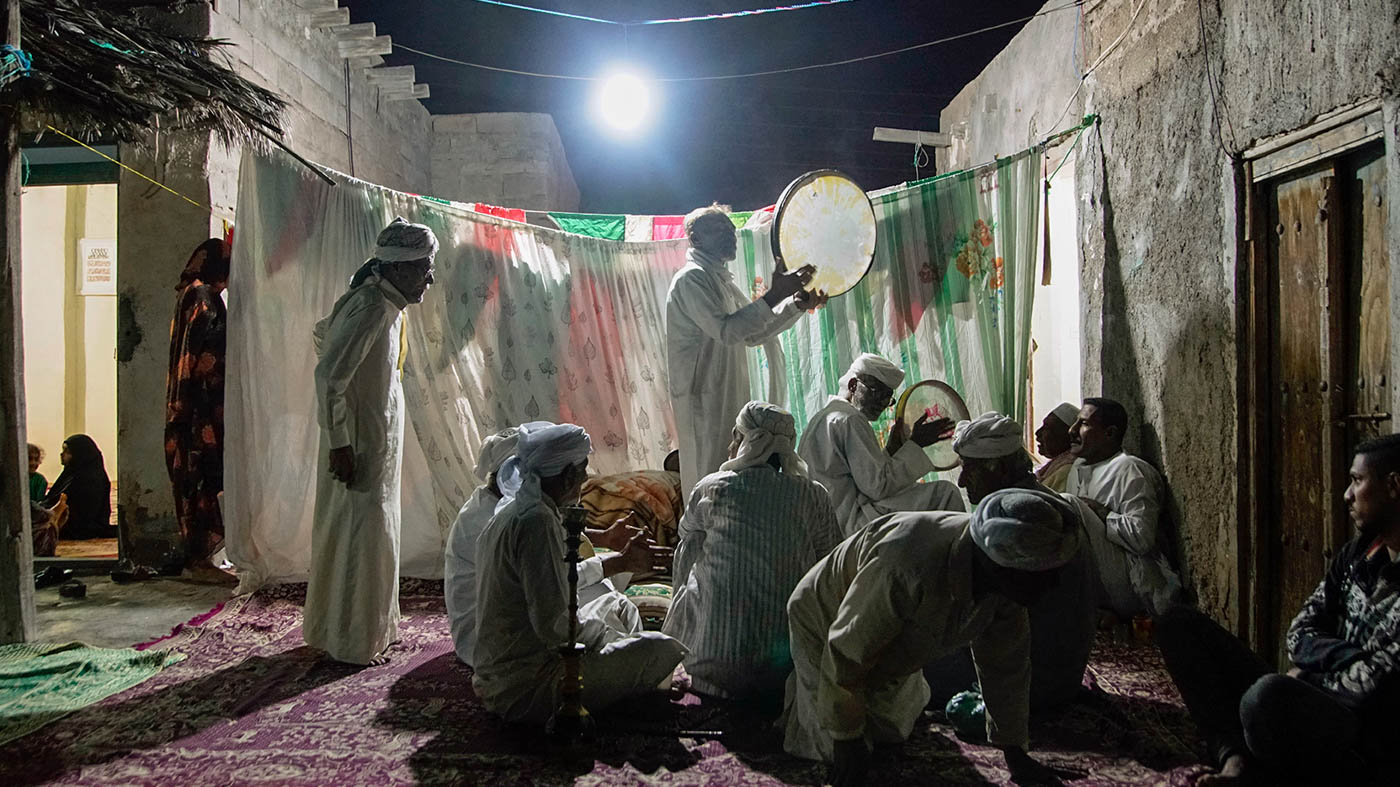
Zār ceremony on Hormuz Island

==== Israel ====
About 150,000 East African and black people live in Israel, amounting to just over 2% of the nation's population. The vast majority of these, some 120,000, are Beta Israel, most of whom are recent immigrants who came during the 1980s and 1990s from Ethiopia. In addition, Israel is home to more than 5,000 members of the African Hebrew Israelites of Jerusalem movement that are ancestry of African Americans who emigrated to Israel in the 20th century, and who reside mainly in a distinct neighborhood in the Negev town of Dimona. Unknown numbers of black converts to Judaism reside in Israel, most of them converts from the United Kingdom, Canada, and the United States.

Additionally, there are around 60,000 non-Jewish African immigrants in Israel, some of whom have sought asylum. Most of the migrants are from communities in Sudan and Eritrea, particularly the Niger-Congo-speaking Nuba groups of the southern Nuba Mountains; some are illegal immigrants.

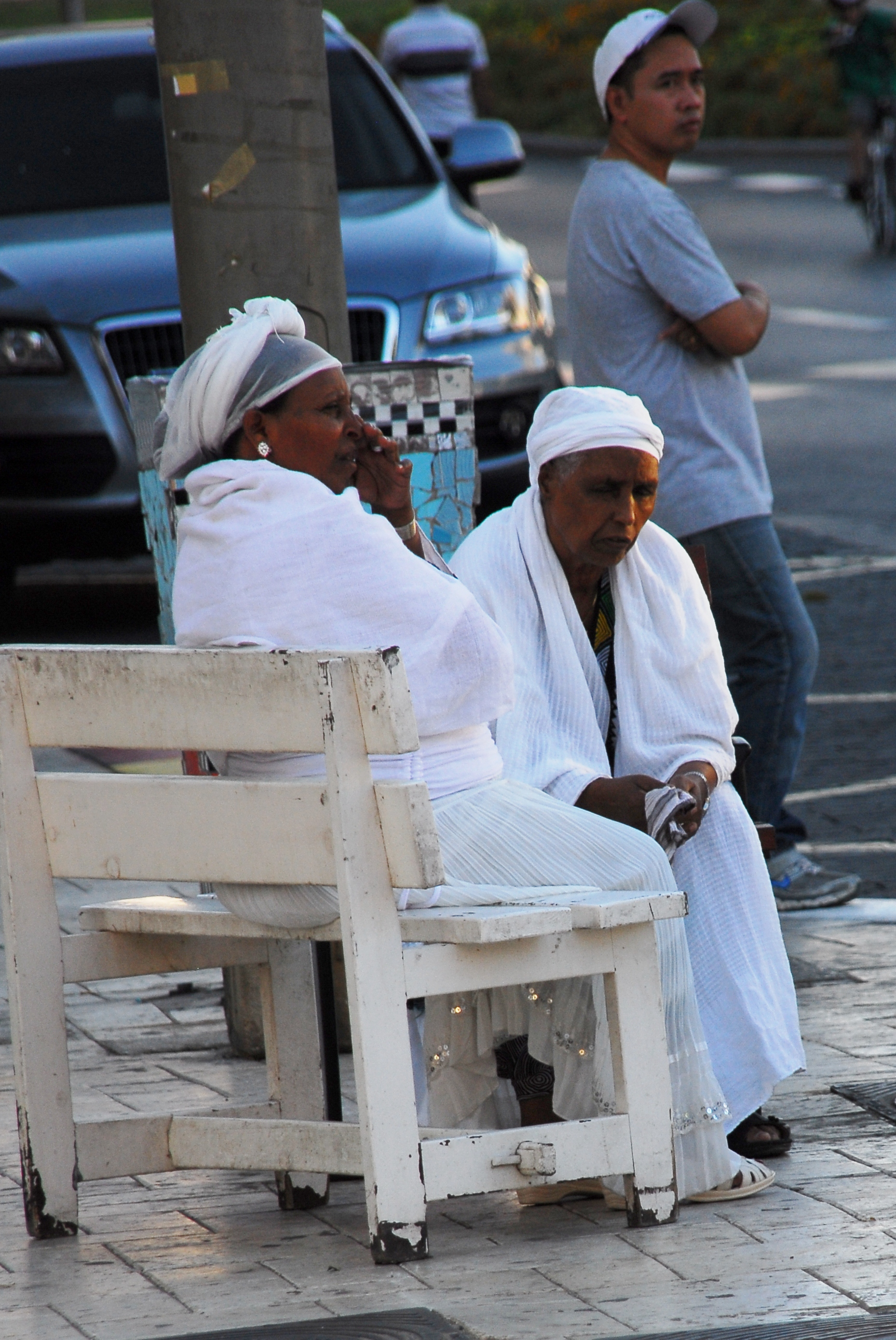
Beta Israel women in Israel

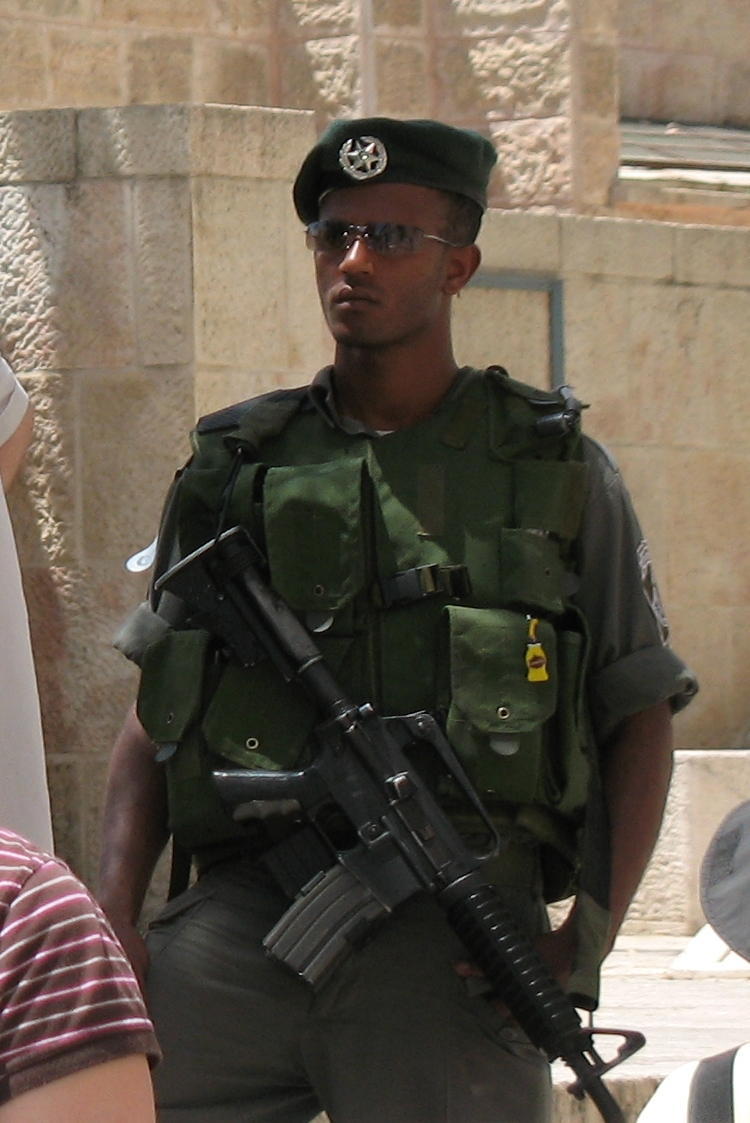
An ethnic Jewish (Beta Israel Ethiopian Jew) Israeli Border Policeman

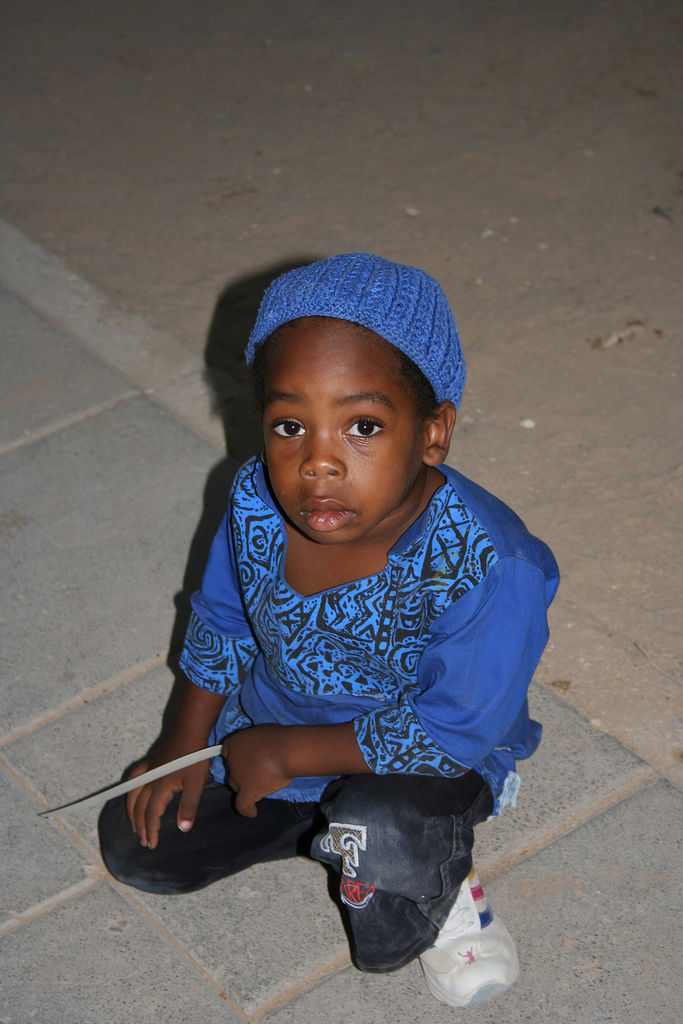
An African Hebrew Israelite child in Dimona

==== Turkey ====
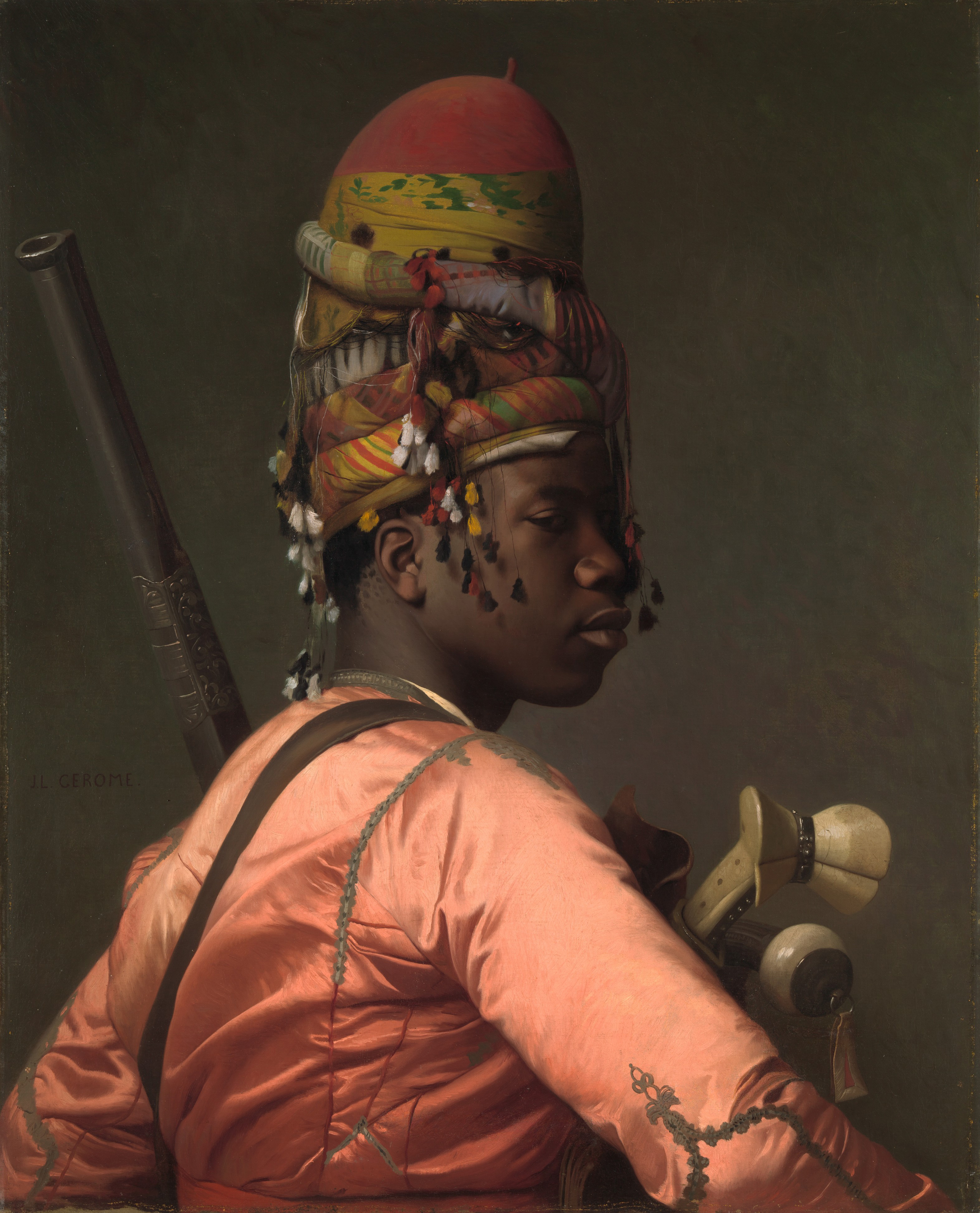
A Bashi-bazouk of the Ottoman Empire, painting by Jean-Léon Gérôme, 1869

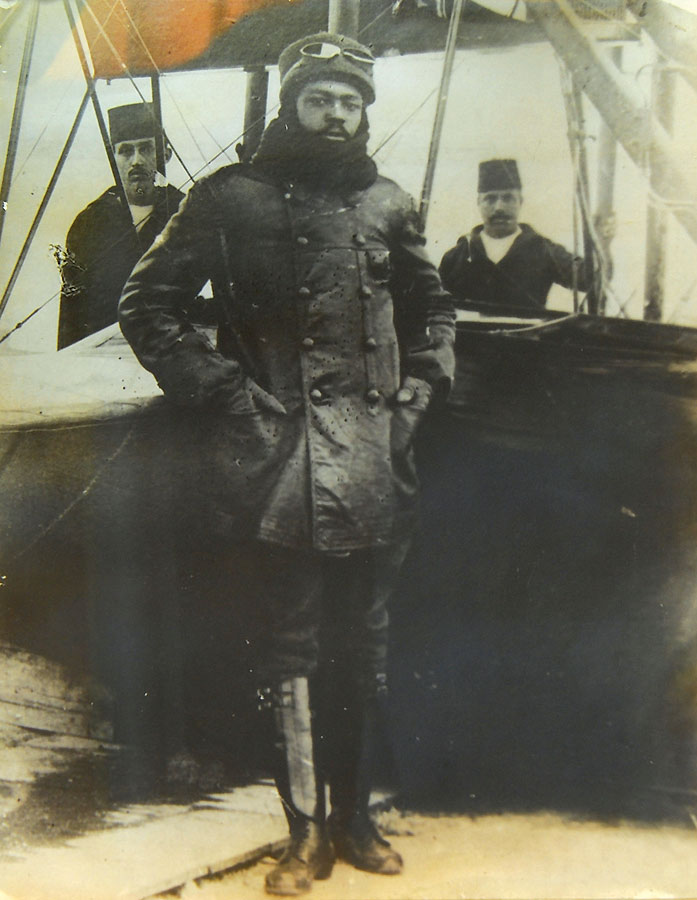
Ahmet Ali Çelikten was the first black pilot in aviation history.

Beginning several centuries ago, during the period of the Ottoman Empire, tens of thousands of Zanj captives were brought by slave traders to plantations and agricultural areas situated between Antalya and Istanbul, which gave rise to the Afro-Turk population in present-day Turkey. Some of their ancestry remained in situ, and many migrated to larger cities and towns. Other black slaves were transported to Crete, from where they or their descendants later reached the İzmir area through the population exchange between Greece and Turkey in 1923, or indirectly from Ayvalık in pursuit of work.

Apart from the historical Afro-Turk presence Turkey also hosts a sizeable immigrant black population since the end of the 1990s. The community is composed mostly of modern immigrants from Ghana, Ethiopia, DRC, Sudan, Nigeria, Kenya, Eritrea, Somalia and Senegal. According to official figures 1.5 million Africans live in Turkey and around 25% of them are located in Istanbul. Other studies state the majority of Africans in Turkey lives in Istanbul and report Tarlabaşı, Dolapdere, Kumkapı, Yenikapı and Kurtuluş as having a strong African presence.

Most of the African immigrants in Turkey come to Turkey to further migrate to Europe. Immigrants from Eastern Africa are usually refugees, meanwhile Western and Central African immigration is reported to be economically driven. It is reported that African immigrants in Turkey regularly face economic and social challenges, notably racism and opposition to immigration by locals.

=== Southern Asia ===
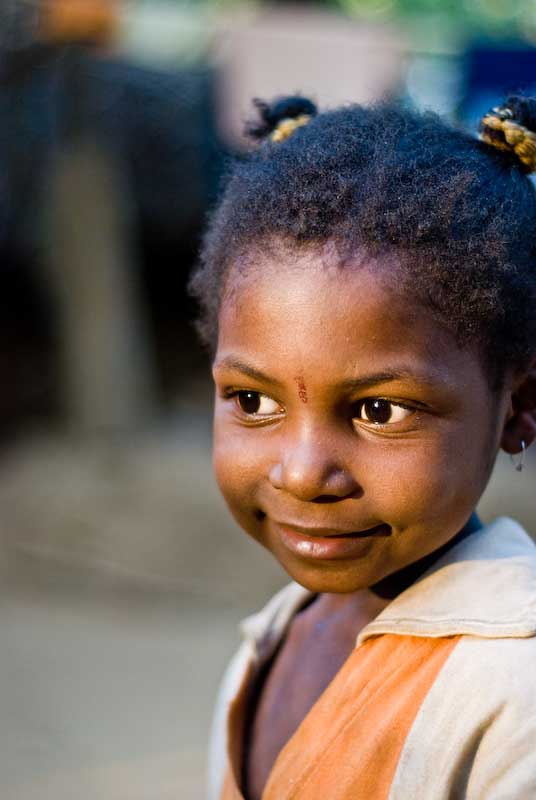
A Siddi girl from the town of Yellapur in Uttara Karnataka district, Karnataka, India

The Siddi are an ethnic group inhabiting India and Pakistan. Members are descended from the Bantu peoples of Southeast Africa. Some were merchants, sailors, indentured servants, slaves or mercenaries. The Siddi population is currently estimated at 270,000–350,000 individuals, living mostly in Karnataka, Gujarat, and Hyderabad in India and Makran and Karachi in Pakistan. In the Makran strip of the Sindh and Balochistan provinces in southwestern Pakistan, these Bantu descendants are known as the Makrani. There was a brief "Black Power" movement in Sindh in the 1960s and many Siddi are proud of and celebrate their African ancestry.

=== Southeastern Asia ===
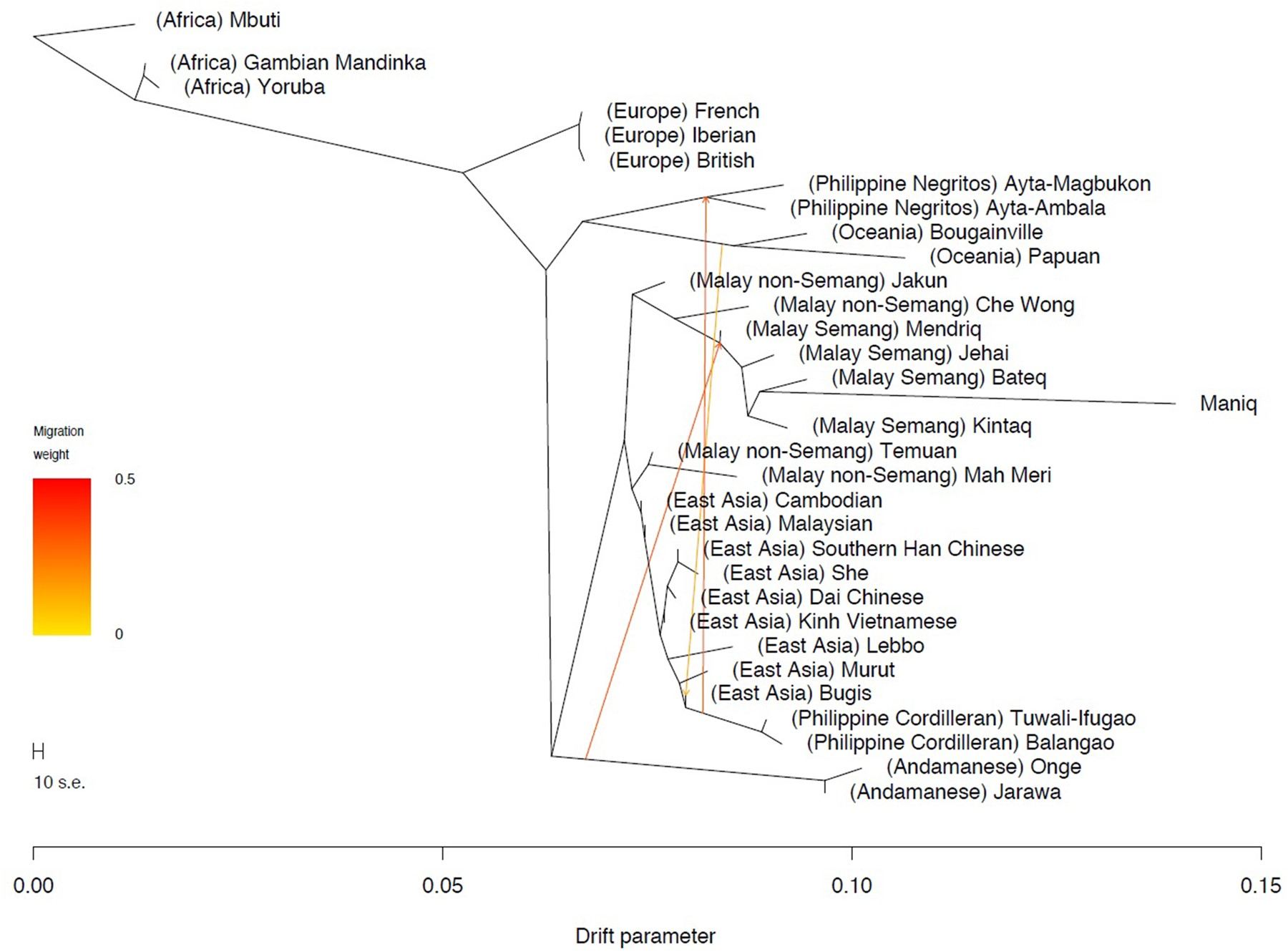
Population genomic "TreeMix" analysis of Malaysian Negritos (Semang) and closely related populations (e.g. East Asians and Andamanese peoples)

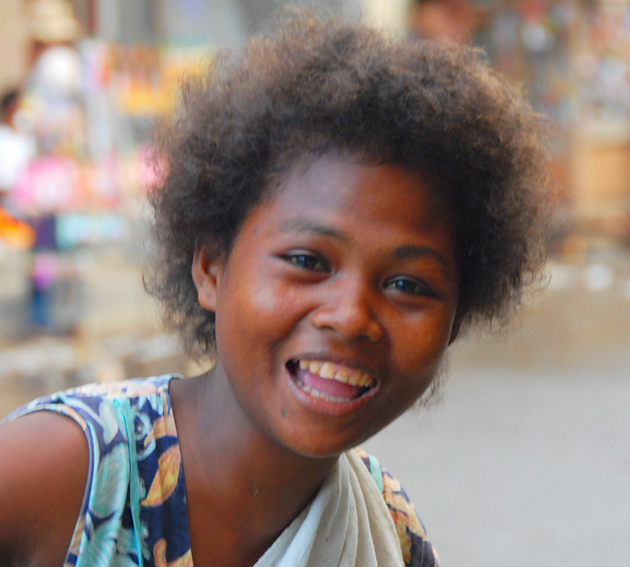
Ati woman, Philippines – the Negritos are an indigenous people of Southeast Asia.

Negritos, are a collection of various, often unrelated peoples, who were once considered a single distinct population of closely related groups due to superficial perceived physical similarities. However, genetic studies show that populations historically classified as Negrito display significant genetic heterogenity, consisting of several separate groups that descend from the same ancient East Eurasian meta-population which gave rise to modern East Asian and Oceanian peoples. Ethnic groups often described as Negrito mainly inhabit isolated parts of Southeast Asia, primarily in Southern Thailand, the Philippines, the Malay Peninsula, and the Andaman Islands of India.

Negrito means "little black people" in Spanish (negrito is the Spanish diminutive of negro, i.e., "little black person"); it is what the Spaniards called the aboriginal people that they encountered in the Philippines. The term Negrito itself has come under criticism in countries like Malaysia, where it is now interchangeable with the more acceptable Semang, although this term actually refers to a specific group.

They have dark skin, often curly-hair and Asiatic facial characteristics, and are stockily built.

Negritos in the Philippines frequently face discrimination. Because of their traditional hunter-gatherer lifestyle, they are marginalized and live in poverty, unable to find employment.

== Europe ==
=== Western Europe ===
==== France ====
While census collection of ethnic background is illegal in France, it is estimated that there are about 2.5 – 5 million black people residing there.

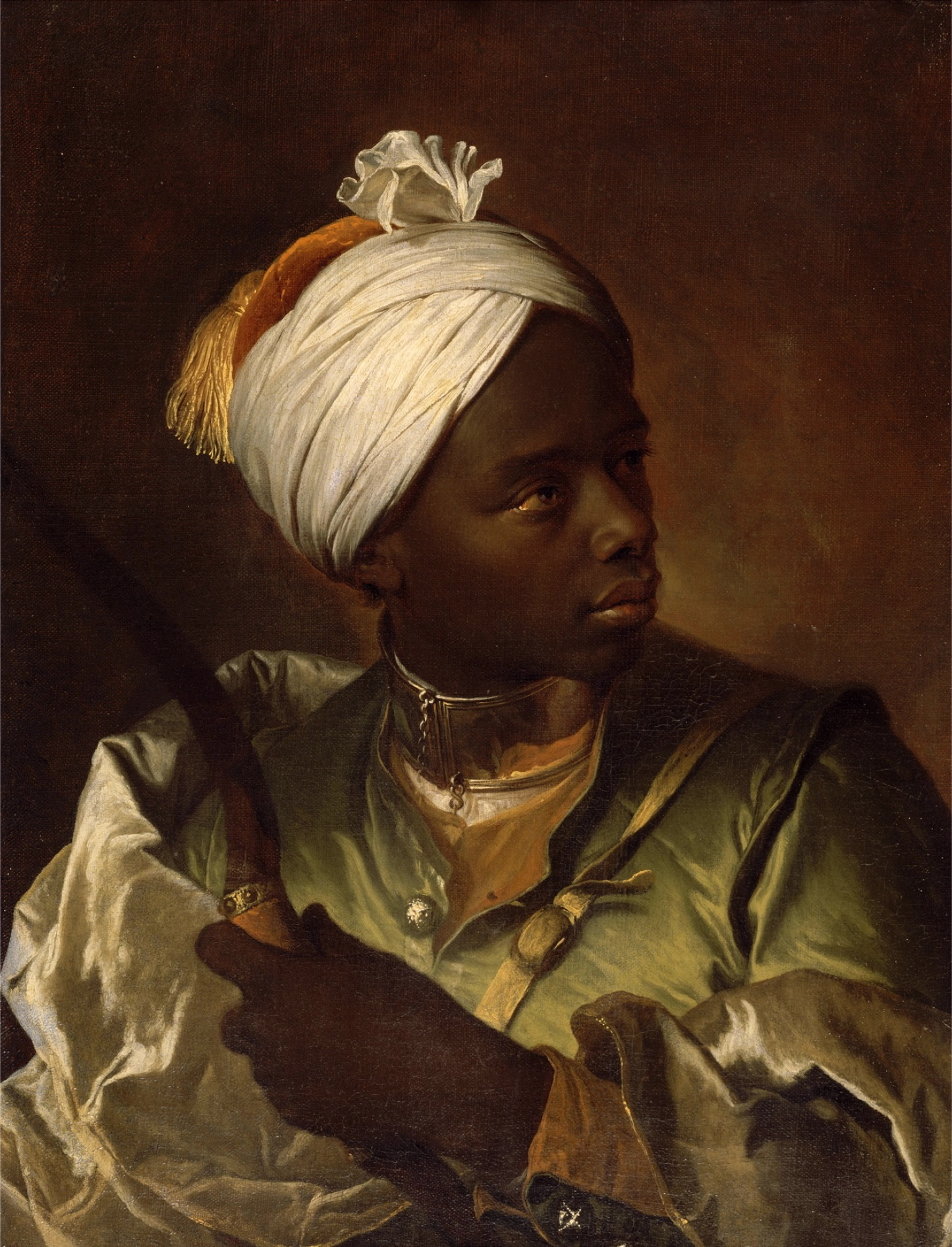
Young black boy with a bow and a slave collar, by Hyacinthe Rigaud, c. 1697

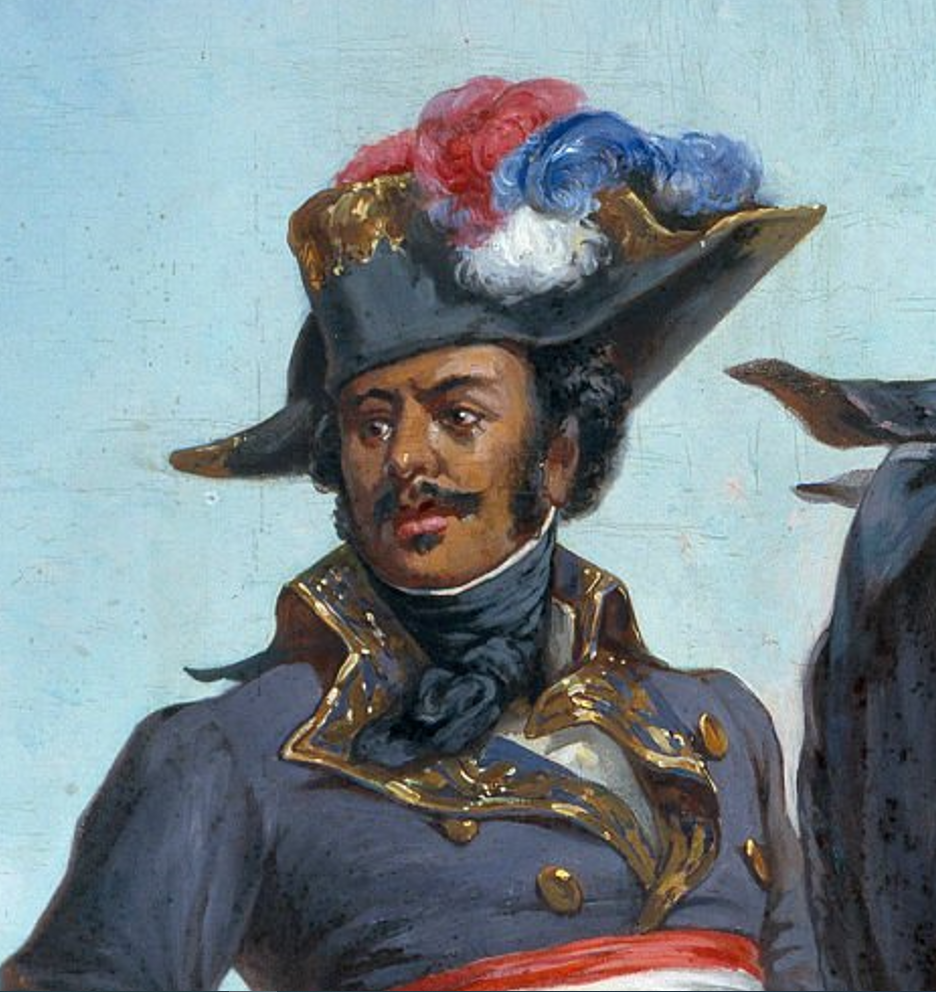
General Thomas-Alexandre Dumas (1762-1806), father of the writer Alexandre Dumas

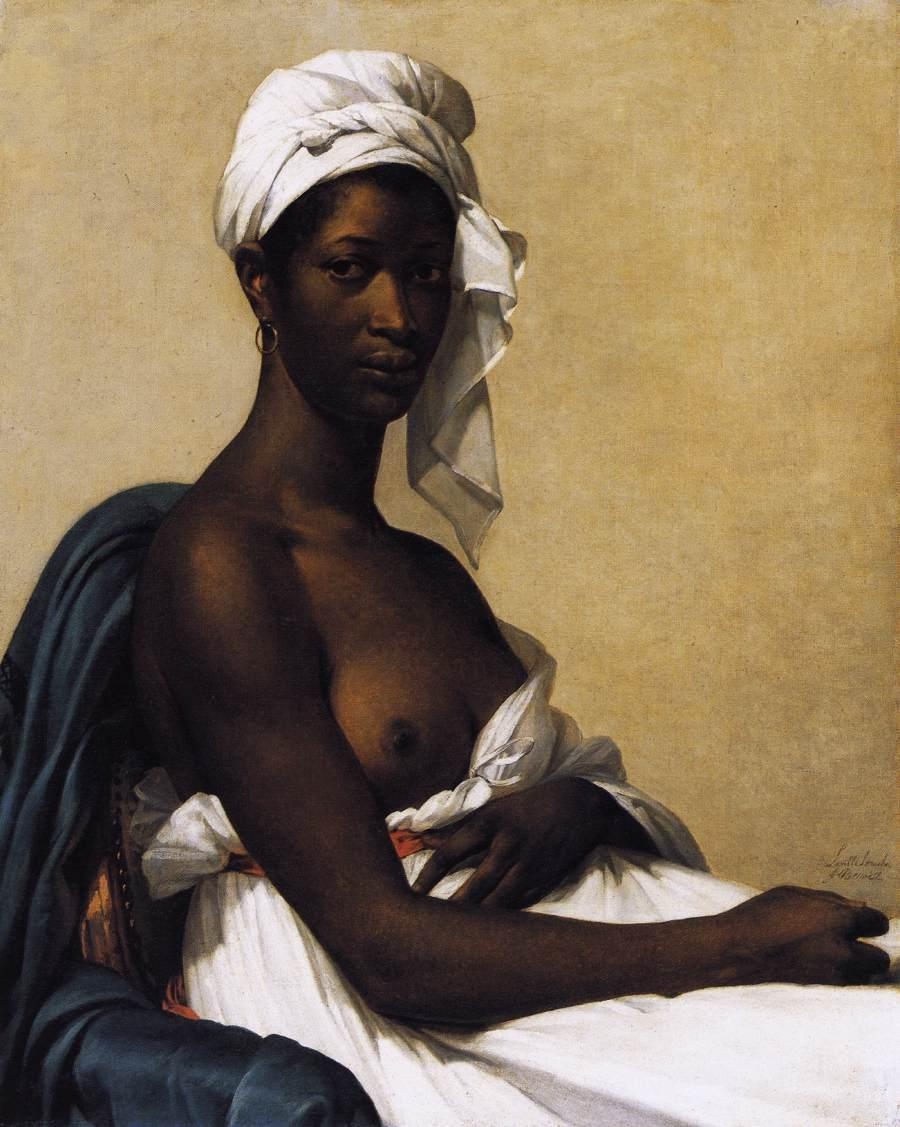
Portrait of Madeleine (1800), sometimes nicknamed the ″Black Mona Lisa″

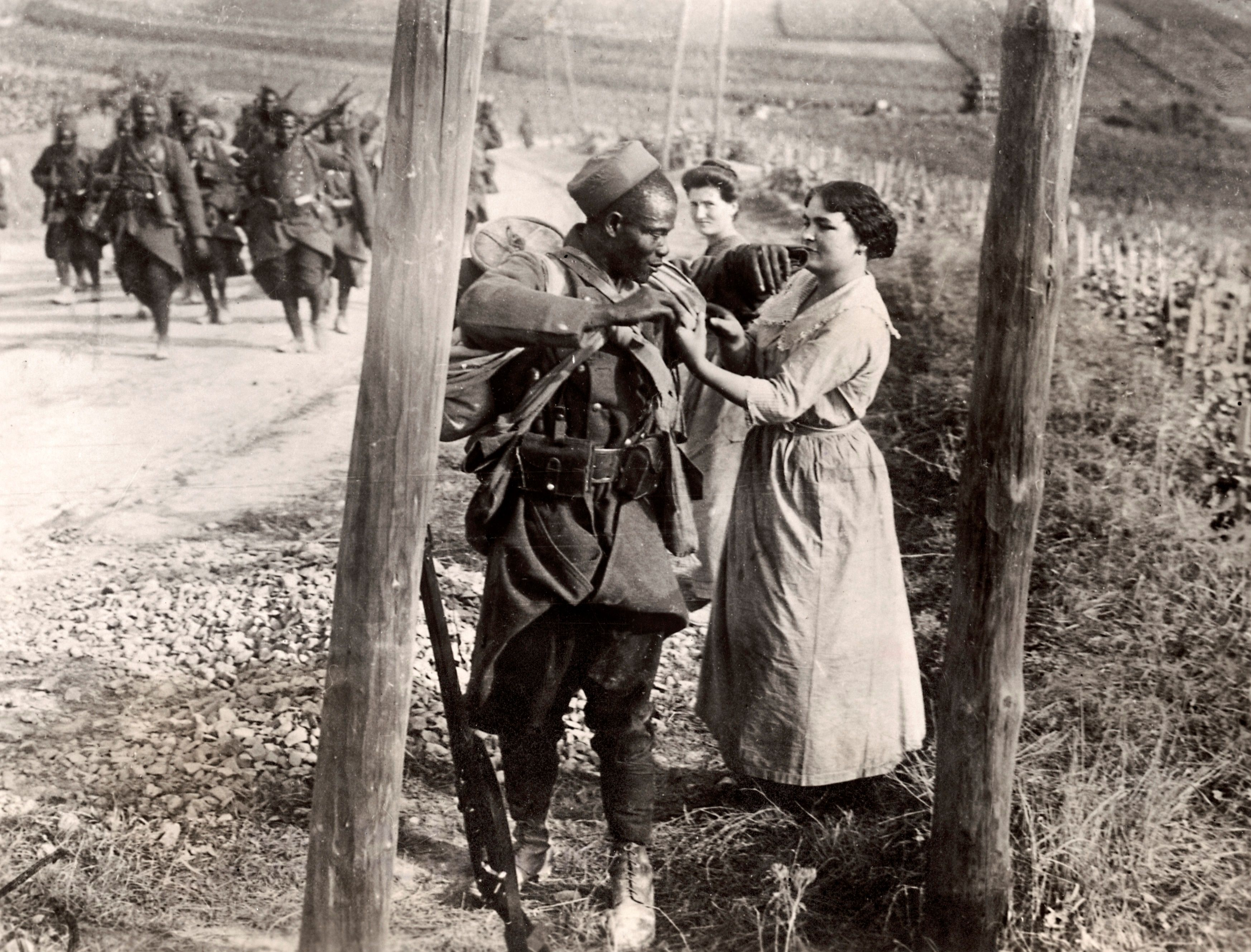
French African tirailleurs going to the front in 1914 and receiving gifts and encouragement from metropolitan women

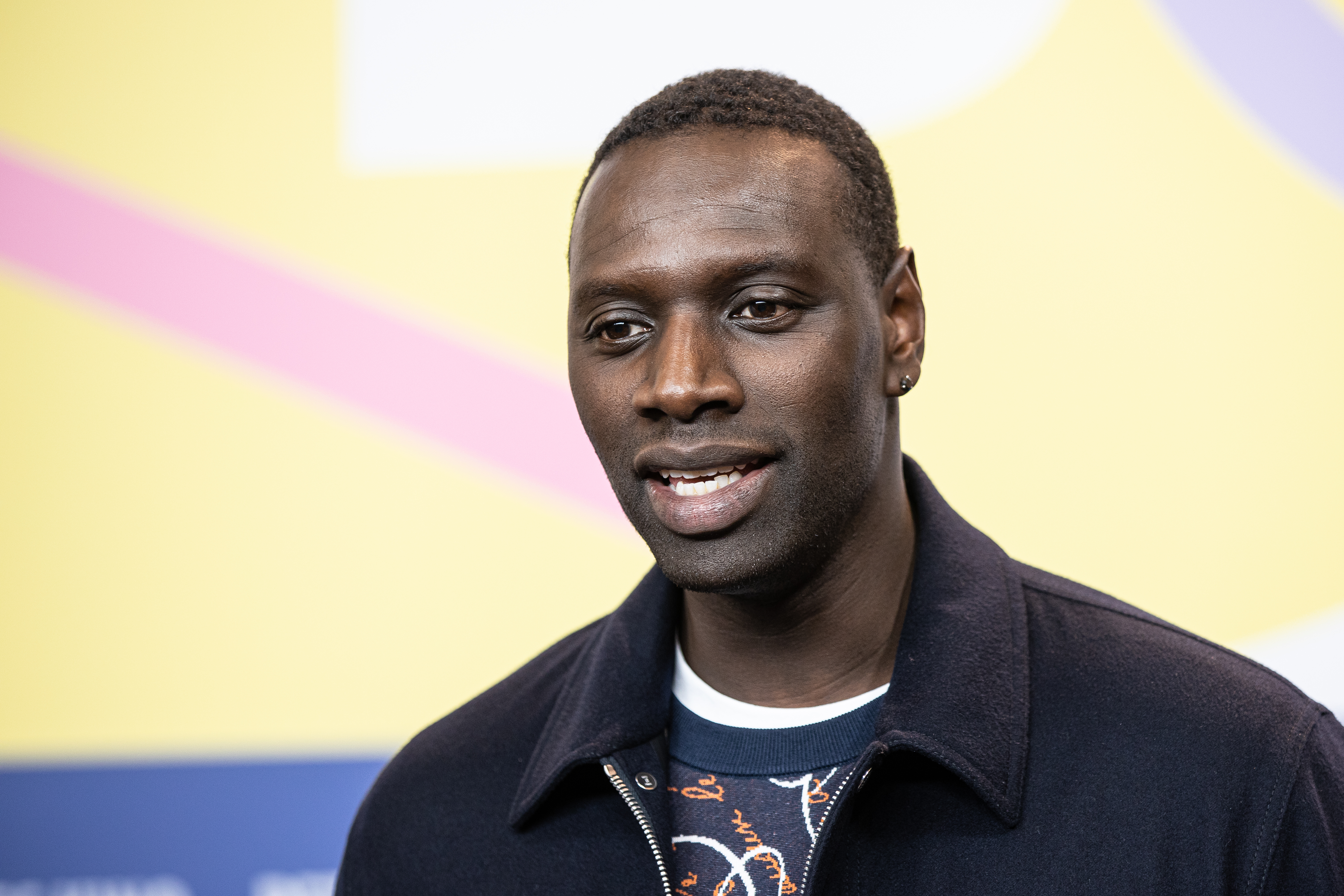
French actor Omar Sy

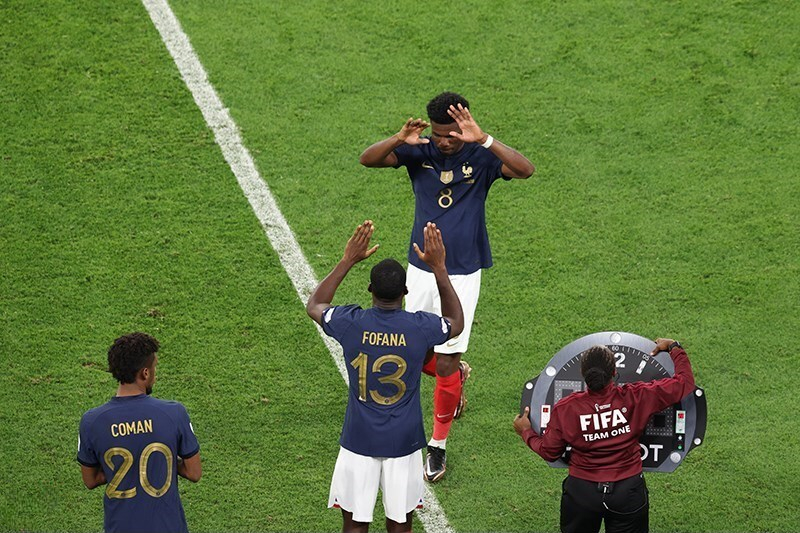
French footballers at the 2022 FIFA World Cup in Qatar

==== Germany ====
As of 2020, there are approximately one million black people living in Germany.

==== Netherlands ====
Afro-Dutch are residents of the Netherlands who are of Black African or Afro-Caribbean ancestry. They tend to be from the former and present Dutch overseas territories of Aruba, Bonaire, Curaçao, Sint Maarten and Suriname. The Netherlands also has sizable Cape Verdean and other African communities.

==== Portugal ====
As of 2021, there were at least 232,000 people of recent Black-African immigrant background living in Portugal. They mainly live in the regions of Lisbon, Porto, Coimbra. As Portugal doesn't collect information dealing with ethnicity, the estimate includes only people that, as of 2021, hold the citizenship of a Sub Saharan African country or people who have acquired Portuguese citizenship from 2008 to 2021, thus excluding descendants, people of more distant African ancestry or people who have settled in Portugal generations ago and are now Portuguese citizens.

==== Spain ====
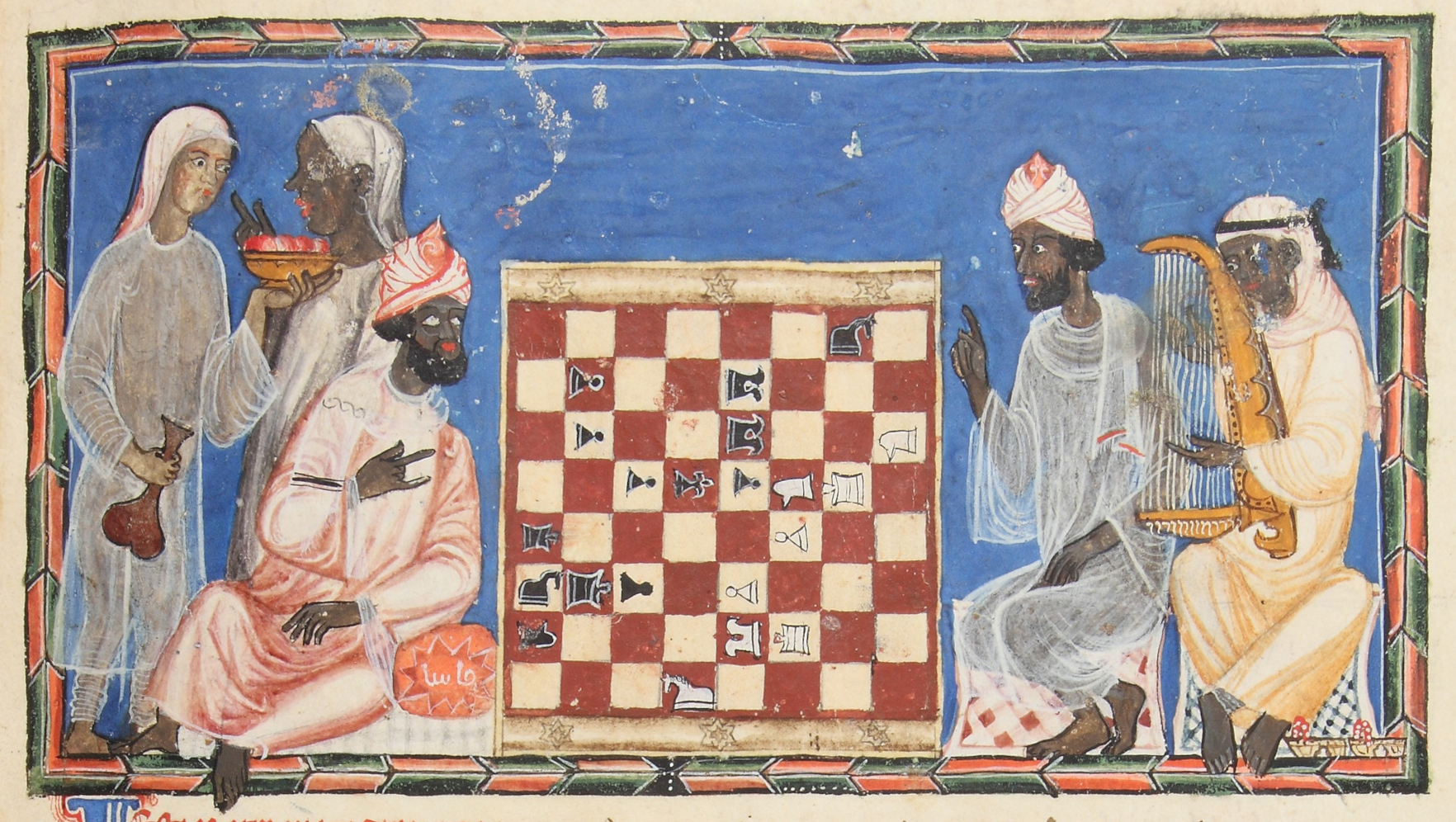
1283 A.D. Miniature from Alfonso X's Book of chess, dice and boards. African Muslims playing chess. The book also has pictures of white and Arab Muslims playing chess in al-Andalusia. Europeans loosely called the invading Muslims Moors, blending the name for both people of Arab and Berber ancestry.

The term "Moors" has been used in Europe in a broader, somewhat derogatory sense to refer to Muslims, especially those of Arab or Berber ancestry, whether living in North Africa or Iberia. Moors were not a distinct or self-defined people. Medieval and early modern Europeans applied the name to Muslim Arabs, Berbers, Africans and Europeans alike.

Isidore of Seville, writing in the 7th century, claimed that the Latin word Maurus was derived from the Greek mauron, μαύρον, which is the Greek word for "black". Indeed, by the time Isidore of Seville came to write his Etymologies, the word Maurus or "Moor" had become an adjective in Latin, "for the Greeks call black, mauron". "In Isidore's day, Moors were black by definition..."

Afro-Spaniards are Spanish nationals of West/Central African ancestry. Today, they mainly come from Cameroon, Equatorial Guinea, Ghana, Gambia, Mali, Nigeria and Senegal. Additionally, many Afro-Spaniards born in Spain are from the former Spanish colony Equatorial Guinea. Today, there are an estimated 683,000 Afro-Spaniards in Spain.

==== United Kingdom ====
Racial groups in the United Kingdom (2021 census)
1. Blacks (3.71%)
2. Other groups (96.3%)

According to the Office for National Statistics, at the 2001 census there were more than a million black people in the United Kingdom; 1% of the total population described themselves as "Black Caribbean", 0.8% as "Black African", and 0.2% as "Black other". Britain encouraged the immigration of workers from the Caribbean after World War II; the first symbolic movement was of those who came on the ship the Empire Windrush and, hence, those who migrated between 1948 and 1970 are known as the Windrush generation. The preferred official umbrella term is "black, Asian and minority ethnic" (BAME), but sometimes the term "black" is used on its own, to express unified opposition to racism, as in the Southall Black Sisters, which started with a mainly British Asian constituency, and the National Black Police Association, which has a membership of "African, African-Caribbean and Asian origin".

=== Eastern Europe ===
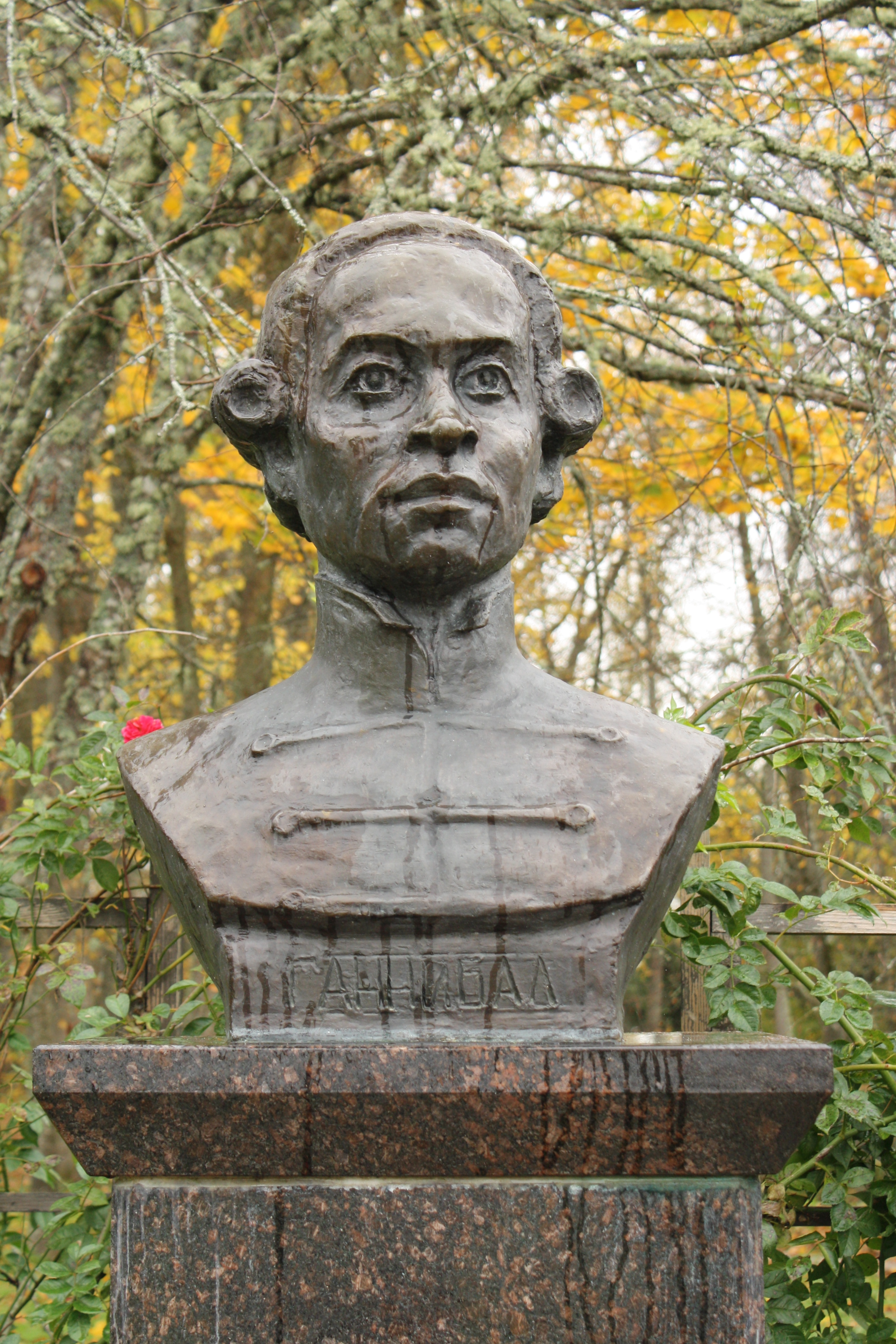
Bust of Russian general Abram Gannibal, who was the great-grandfather of Alexander Pushkin

As African states became independent in the 1960s, the Soviet Union offered many of their citizens the chance to study in Russia. Over a period of 40 years, about 400,000 African students from various countries moved to Russia to pursue higher studies, including many black Africans. This extended beyond the Soviet Union to many countries of the Eastern bloc.

==== Balkans ====
Due to the slave trade in the Ottoman Empire that had flourished in the Balkans, the coastal town of Ulcinj in Montenegro had its own black community. In 1878, that community consisted of about 100 people.

== Oceania ==
=== Indigenous Australians ===
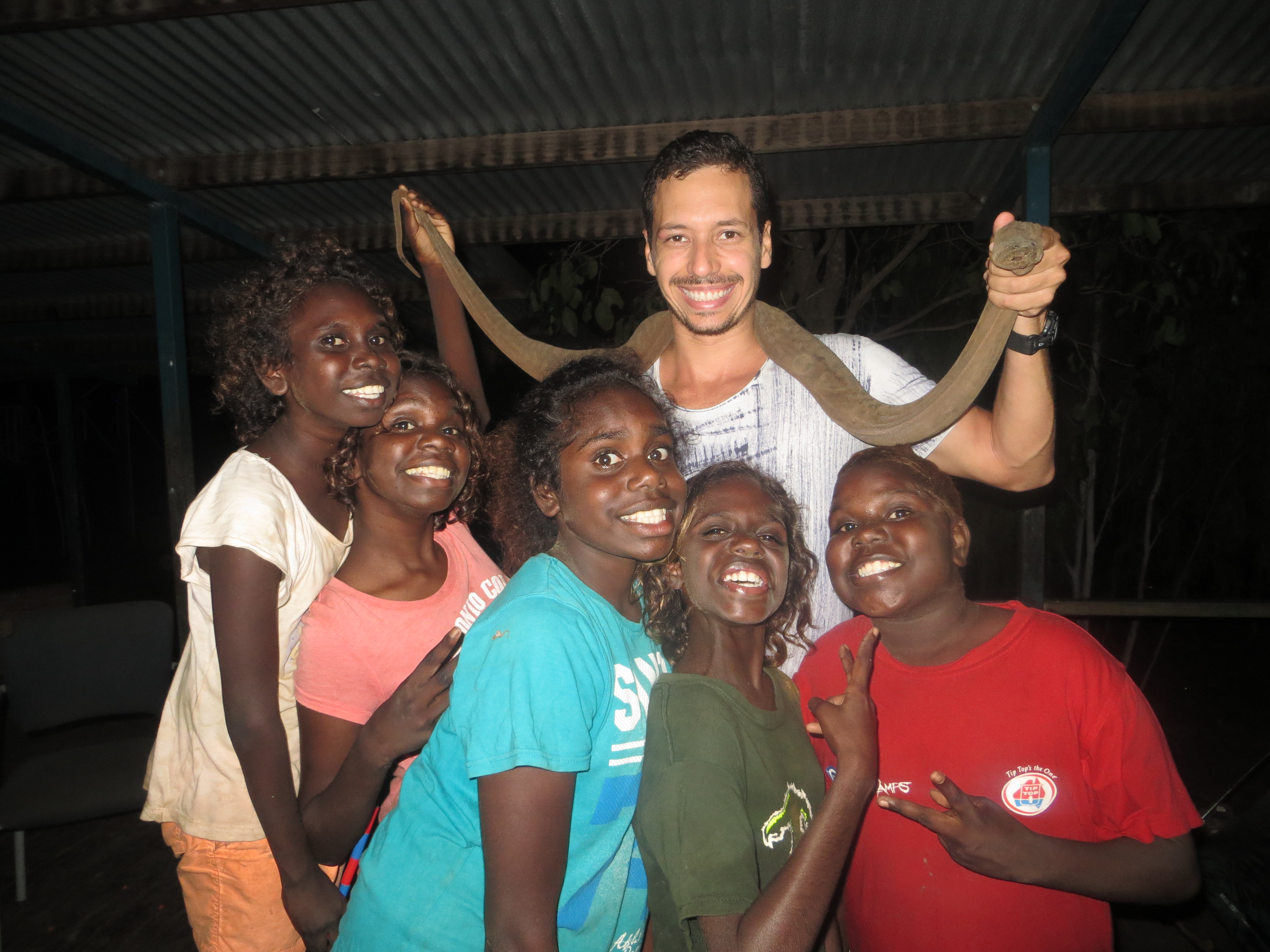
Children of an Aboriginal tribe, 2014

Indigenous Australians have been referred to as "black people" in Australia since the early days of European settlement. While originally related to skin colour, the term is used today to indicate Aboriginal or Torres Strait Islander ancestry in general and can refer to people of any skin pigmentation.

Being identified as either "black" or "white" in Australia during the 19th and early 20th centuries was critical in one's employment and social prospects. Various state-based Aboriginal Protection Boards were established which had virtually complete control over the lives of Indigenous Australians – where they lived, their employment, marriage, education and included the power to separate children from their parents. Indigenous Australians were not allowed to vote and were often confined to reserves and forced into low paid or effectively slave labour. The social position of mixed-race or "half-caste" individuals varied over time. A 1913 report by Baldwin Spencer states that:

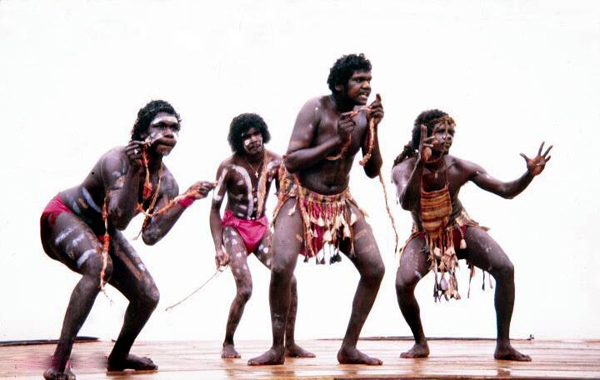
Aboriginal dancers in 1981

the half-castes belong neither to the aboriginal nor to the whites, yet, on the whole, they have more leaning towards the former; ... One thing is certain and that is that the white population as a whole will never mix with half-castes... the best and kindest thing is to place them on reserves along with the natives, train them in the same schools and encourage them to marry amongst themselves.

After the First World War, however, it became apparent that the number of mixed-race people was growing at a faster rate than the white population, and, by 1930, fear of the "half-caste menace" undermining the White Australia ideal from within was being taken as a serious concern. Cecil Cook, the Northern Territory Protector of Natives, noted that:

generally by the fifth and invariably by the sixth generation, all native characteristics of the Australian Aborigine are eradicated. The problem of our half-castes will quickly be eliminated by the complete disappearance of the black race, and the swift submergence of their progeny in the white.

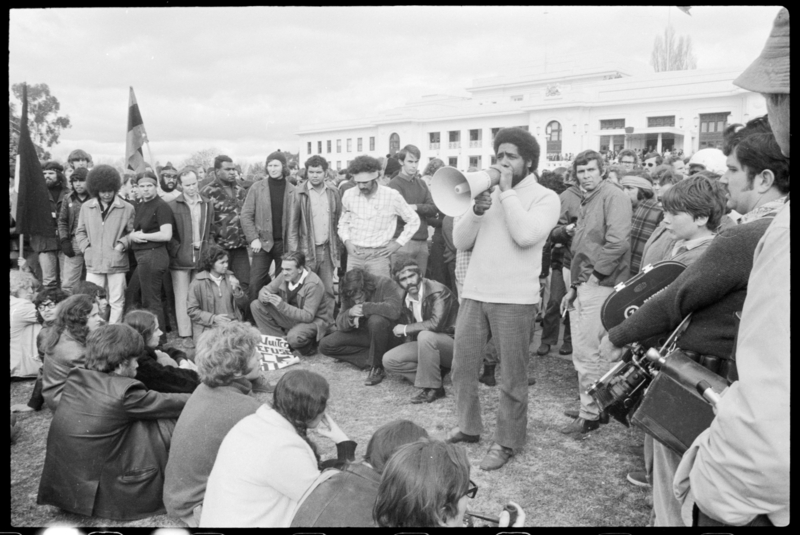
Director and activist Bob Maza, 1972

The official policy became one of biological and cultural assimilation: "Eliminate the full-blood and permit the white admixture to half-castes and eventually the race will become white". This led to different treatment for "black" and "half-caste" individuals, with lighter-skinned individuals targeted for removal from their families to be raised as "white" people and prohibited from speaking their native language and practicing traditional customs, a process now known as the Stolen Generation.

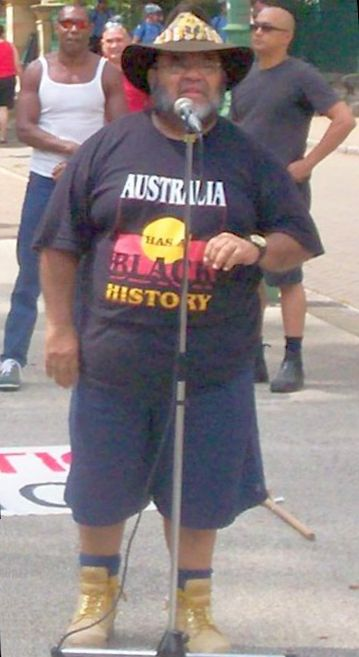
Aboriginal activist Sam Watson addressing Invasion Day Rally 2007 in an "Australia has a Black History" T-shirt

The second half of the 20th century to the present has seen a gradual shift towards improved human rights for Aboriginal people. In a 1967 referendum, more than 90% of the Australian population voted to end constitutional discrimination and to include Indigenous Australians in the national census. During this period, many Aboriginal activists began to embrace the term "black" and use their ancestry as a source of pride. Activist Bob Maza said:

I only hope that when I die I can say I'm black and it's beautiful to be black. It is this sense of pride which we are trying to give back to the aborigine [sic] today.

In 1978, Aboriginal writer Kevin Gilbert received the National Book Council award for his book Living Black: Blacks Talk to Kevin Gilbert, a collection of Aboriginal people's stories, and in 1998 was awarded (but refused to accept) the Human Rights Award for Literature for Inside Black Australia, a poetry anthology and exhibition of Aboriginal photography. In contrast to previous definitions based solely on the degree of Aboriginal ancestry, the Government changed the legal definition of Aboriginal in 1990 to include any:

person of Aboriginal or Torres Strait Islander descent who identifies as an Aboriginal or Torres Strait Islander and is accepted as such by the community in which he [or she] lives

This nationwide acceptance and recognition of Aboriginal people led to a significant increase in the number of people self-identifying as Aboriginal or Torres Strait Islander. The reappropriation of the term "black" with a positive and more inclusive meaning has resulted in its widespread use in mainstream Australian culture, including public media outlets, government agencies, and private companies. In 2012, a number of high-profile cases highlighted the legal and community attitude that identifying as Aboriginal or Torres Strait Islander is not dependent on skin color, with a well-known boxer Anthony Mundine being widely criticized for questioning the "blackness" of another boxer and journalist Andrew Bolt being successfully sued for publishing discriminatory comments about Aboriginals with light skin.

=== Melanesians ===
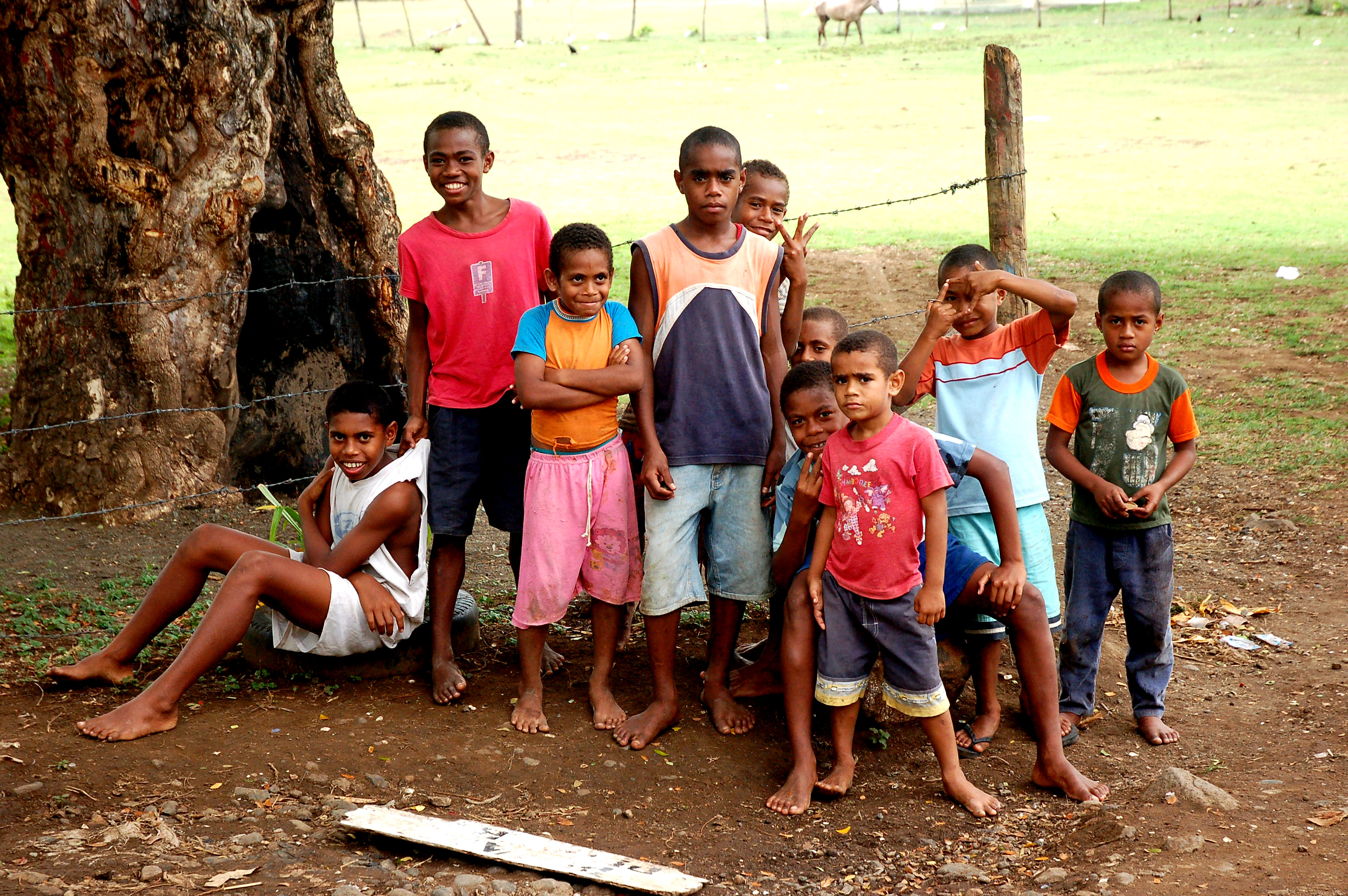
Group of Fijian children, 2008

The region of Melanesia is named from Greek μέλας, black, and νῆσος, island, etymologically meaning "islands of black [people]", in reference to the dark skin of the indigenous peoples. Early European settlers, such as Spanish explorer Yñigo Ortiz de Retez, noted the resemblance of the people to those in Africa.

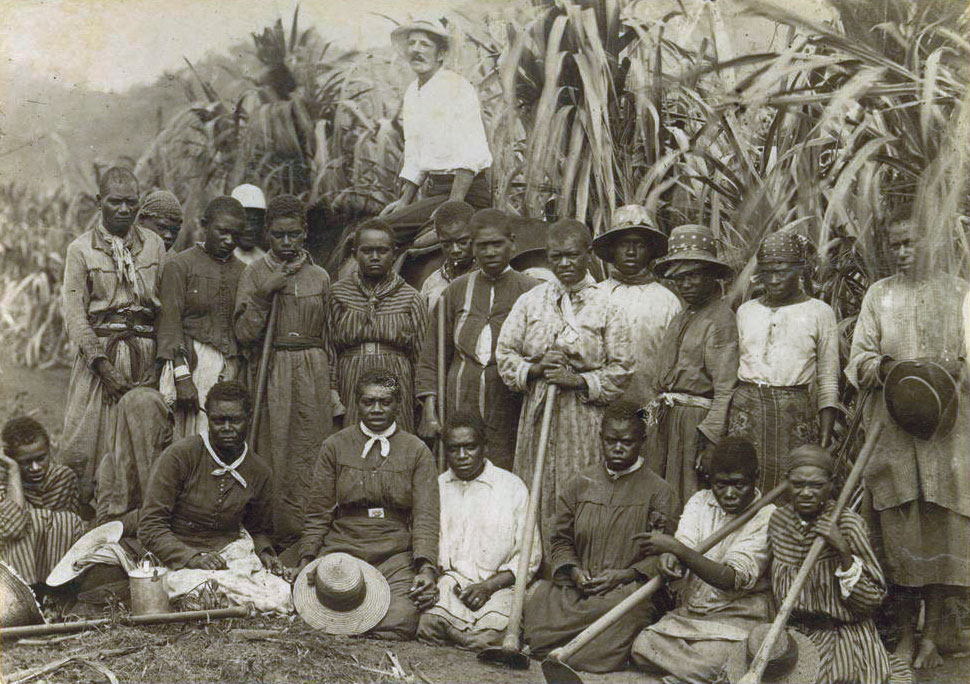
Kanaka workers in a sugar cane plantation in Queensland, late 19th century

Melanesians, along with other Pacific Islanders, were frequently deceived or coerced during the 19th and 20th centuries into forced labour for sugarcane, cotton, and coffee planters in countries distant to their native lands in a practice known as blackbirding. In Queensland, some 55,000 to 62,500 were brought from the New Hebrides, the Solomon Islands, and New Guinea to work in sugarcane fields. Under the Pacific Island Labourers Act 1901, most islanders working in Queensland were repatriated back to their homelands. Those who remained in Australia, commonly called South Sea Islanders, often faced discrimination similarly to Indigenous Australians by white-dominated society. Many indigenous rights activists have South Sea Islander ancestry, including Faith Bandler, Evelyn Scott and Bonita Mabo.

Many Melanesians have taken up the term 'Melanesia' as a way to empower themselves as a collective people. Stephanie Lawson writes that the term "moved from a term of denigration to one of affirmation, providing a positive basis for contemporary subregional identity as well as a formal organisation". For instance, the term is used in the Melanesian Spearhead Group, which seeks to promote economic growth among Melanesian countries.

=== Other ===
John Caesar, nicknamed "Black Caesar", a convict and bushranger with parents born in an unknown area in Africa, was one of the first people of recent black African ancestry to arrive in Australia.

At the 2006 Census, 248,605 residents declared that they were born in Africa. This figure pertains to all immigrants to Australia who were born in nations in Africa regardless of race, and includes white Africans.

== North America ==
=== Canada ===
Racial groups in Canada (2021 census)
1. Blacks (4.34%)
2. Other groups (95.7%)

"Black Canadians" is a designation used for people of black African ancestry who are citizens or permanent residents of Canada. The majority of black Canadians are of Caribbean origin, though the population also consists of African American immigrants and their descendants (including black Nova Scotians), as well as many African immigrants.

Black Canadians often draw a distinction between those of Afro-Caribbean ancestry and those of other African roots. The term African Canadian is occasionally used by some black Canadians who trace their heritage to the first slaves brought by British and French colonists to the North American mainland. Promised freedom by the British during the American Revolutionary War, thousands of Black Loyalists were resettled by the Crown in Canada afterward, such as Thomas Peters. In addition, an estimated ten to thirty thousand fugitive slaves reached freedom in Canada from the Southern United States during the Antebellum years, aided by people along the Underground Railroad.

Many black people of Caribbean origin in Canada reject the term "African Canadian" as an elision of the uniquely Caribbean aspects of their heritage, and instead identify as Caribbean Canadian. Unlike in the United States, where "African American" has become a widely used term, in Canada controversies associated with distinguishing African or Caribbean heritage have resulted in the term "black Canadian" being widely accepted there.

=== United States ===
Racial groups in the United States (2020 census)
1. Blacks (12.4%)
2. Other groups (87.6%)

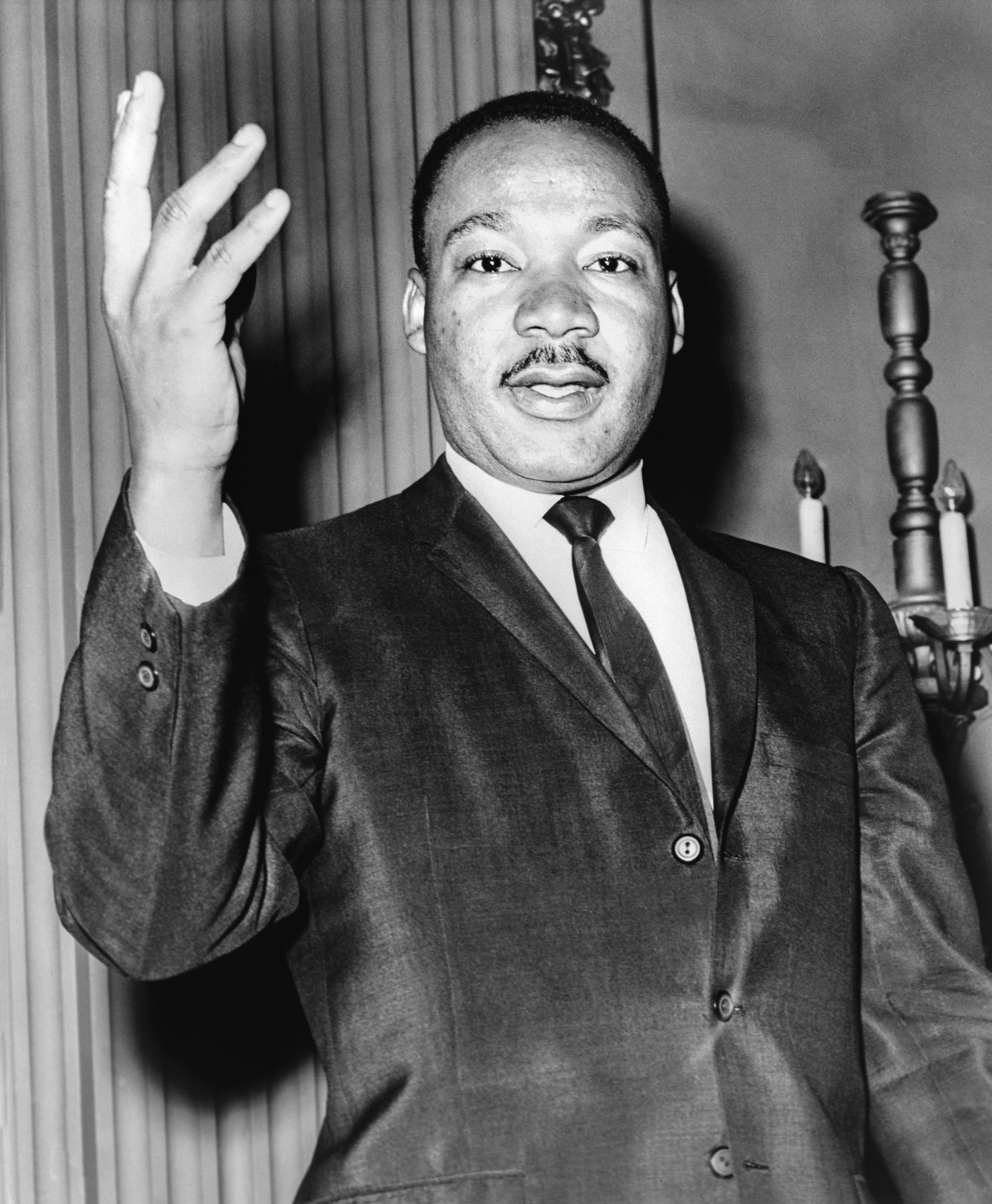
Civil rights activist Martin Luther King Jr.

There were eight principal areas used by Europeans to buy and ship slaves to the Western Hemisphere. The number of enslaved people sold to the New World varied throughout the slave trade. As for the distribution of slaves from regions of activity, certain areas produced far more enslaved people than others. Between 1650 and 1900, 10.24 million enslaved West Africans arrived in the Americas from the following regions in the following proportions:

- Senegambia (Senegal and The Gambia): 4.8%
- Upper Guinea (Guinea-Bissau, Guinea and Sierra Leone): 4.1%
- Windward Coast (Liberia and Ivory Coast): 1.8%
- Gold Coast (Ghana and east of Ivory Coast): 10.4%
- Bight of Benin (Togo, Benin and Nigeria west of the Niger Delta): 20.2%
- Bight of Biafra (Nigeria east of the Niger Delta, Cameroon, Equatorial Guinea and Gabon): 14.6%
- West Central Africa (Republic of the Congo, Democratic Republic of the Congo and Angola): 39.4%
- Southeastern Africa (Mozambique and Madagascar): 4.7%

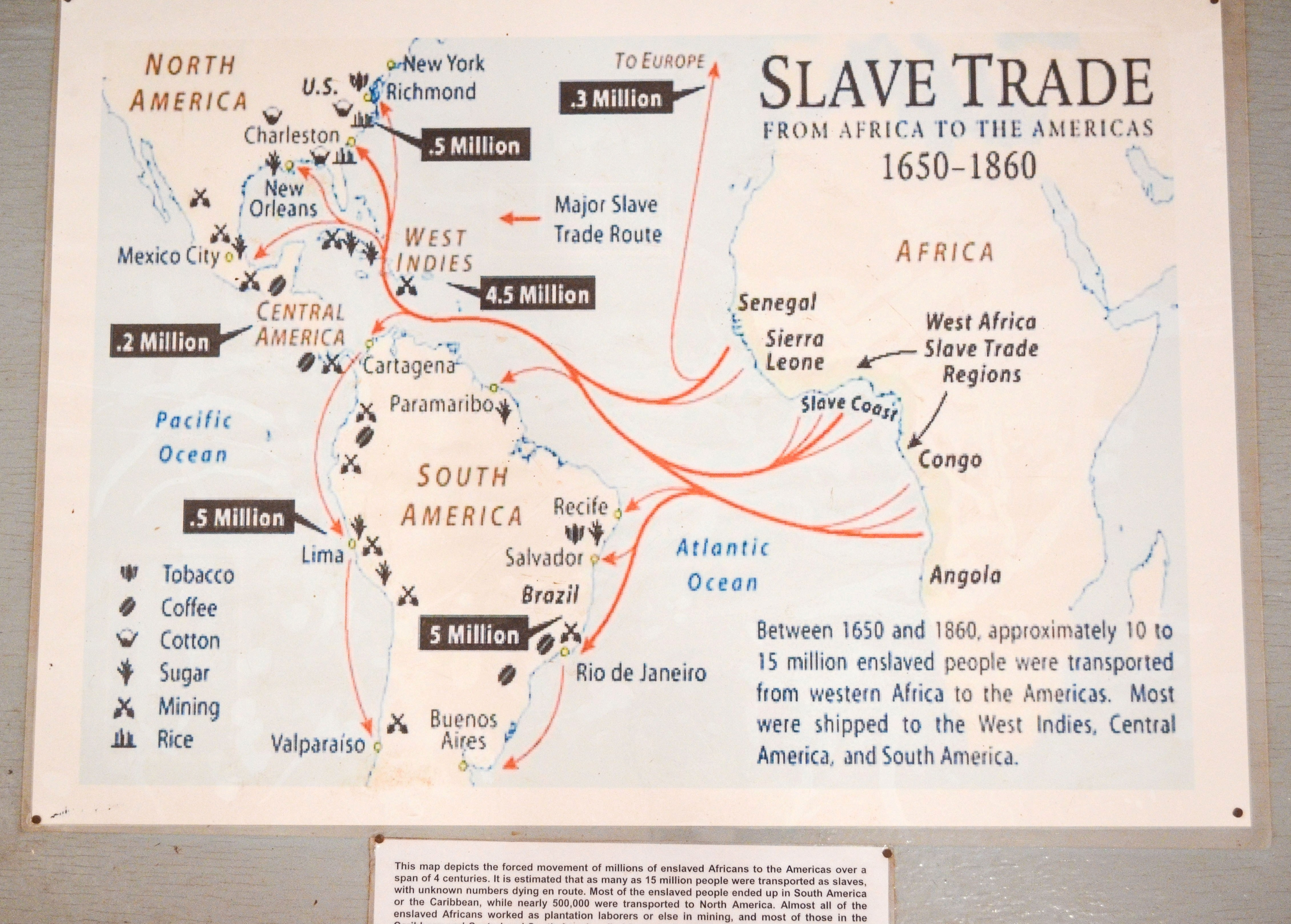
The main slave routes in the Atlantic Slave Trade

By the early 1900s, nigger had become a pejorative word in the United States. In its stead, the term colored became the mainstream alternative to negro and its derived terms. After the American Civil Rights Movement, the terms colored and negro gave way to "black". Negro had superseded colored as the most polite word for African Americans at a time when black was considered more offensive. This term was accepted as normal, including by people classified as Negroes, until the later Civil Rights movement in the late 1960s. One well-known example is the use by Dr. Rev. Martin Luther King Jr. of "Negro" in his famous speech of 1963, I Have a Dream. During the American civil rights movement of the 1950s and 1960s, some African-American leaders in the United States, notably Malcolm X, objected to the word Negro because they associated it with the long history of slavery, segregation, and discrimination that treated African Americans as second-class citizens, or worse. Malcolm X preferred Black to Negro, but later gradually abandoned that as well for Afro-American after leaving the Nation of Islam.

Since the late 1960s, various other terms for African Americans have been more widespread in popular usage. Aside from black American, these include Afro-American (in use from the late 1960s to 1990) and African American (used in the United States to refer to Black Americans, people often referred to in the past as American Negroes).

In the first 200 years that black people were in the United States, they primarily identified themselves by their specific ethnic group (closely allied to language) and not by skin color. Individuals identified themselves, for example, as Ashanti, Igbo, Bakongo, or Wolof. However, when the first captives were brought to the Americas, they were often combined with other groups from West Africa, and individual ethnic affiliations were not generally acknowledged by English colonists. In areas of the Upper South, different ethnic groups were brought together. This is significant as the captives came from a vast geographic region: the West African coastline stretching from Senegal to Angola and in some cases from the south-east coast such as Mozambique. A new African-American identity and culture was born that incorporated elements of the various ethnic groups and of European cultural heritage, resulting in fusions such as the Black church and African-American English. This new identity was based on provenance and slave status rather than membership in any one ethnic group.

By contrast, slave records from Louisiana show that the French and Spanish colonists recorded more complete identities of the West Africans, including ethnicities and given tribal names.

The U.S. racial or ethnic classification "black" refers to people with all possible kinds of skin pigmentation, from the darkest through to the very lightest skin colors, including albinos, if they are believed by others to have African ancestry (in any discernible percentage). There are also certain cultural traits associated with being "African American", a term used effectively as a synonym for "black person" within the United States.

In March 1807, Great Britain, which largely controlled the Atlantic, declared the transatlantic slave trade illegal, as did the United States. (The latter prohibition took effect 1 January 1808, the earliest date on which Congress had the power to do so after protecting the slave trade under Article I, Section 9 of the United States Constitution.)

By that time, the majority of black people in the United States were native-born, so the use of the term "African" became problematic. Though initially a source of pride, many blacks feared that the use of African as an identity would be a hindrance to their fight for full citizenship in the United States. They also felt that it would give ammunition to those who were advocating repatriating black people back to Africa. In 1835, black leaders called upon Black Americans to remove the title of "African" from their institutions and replace it with "Negro" or "Colored American". A few institutions chose to keep their historic names, such as the African Methodist Episcopal Church. African Americans popularly used the terms "Negro" or "colored" for themselves until the late 1960s.

The term black was used throughout but not frequently since it carried a certain stigma. In his 1963 "I Have a Dream" speech, Martin Luther King Jr. uses the terms negro fifteen times and black four times. Each time that he uses black, it is in parallel construction with white; for example, "black men and white men".

With the successes of the American Civil Rights Movement, a new term was needed to break from the past and help shed the reminders of legalized discrimination. In place of Negro, activists promoted the use of black as standing for racial pride, militancy, and power. Some of the turning points included the use of the term "Black Power" by Kwame Ture (Stokely Carmichael) and the popular singer James Brown's song "Say It Loud – I'm Black and I'm Proud".

In 1988, the civil rights leader Jesse Jackson urged Americans to use instead the term "African American" because it had a historical cultural base and was a construction similar to terms used by European descendants, such as German American, Italian American, etc. Since then, African American and black have often had parallel status. However, controversy continues over which, if any, of the two terms is more appropriate. Maulana Karenga argues that the term African-American is more appropriate because it accurately articulates their geographical and historical origin. Others have argued that "black" is a better term because "African" suggests foreignness, although black Americans helped found the United States. Still others believe that the term "black" is inaccurate because African Americans have a variety of skin tones. Some surveys suggest that the majority of Black Americans have no preference for "African American" or "black", although they have a slight preference for "black" in personal settings and "African American" in more formal settings.

In the U.S. census race definitions, black and African Americans are citizens and residents of the United States with origins in the black racial groups of Africa. According to the Office of Management and Budget, the grouping includes individuals who self-identify as African American, as well as persons who emigrated from nations in the Caribbean and Africa. The grouping is thus based on geography, and may contradict or misrepresent an individual's self-identification, since not all immigrants from Africa are "black". The Census Bureau also notes that these classifications are socio-political constructs and should not be interpreted as scientific or anthropological.

According to U.S. Census Bureau data, African immigrants generally do not self-identify as African American. The overwhelming majority of African immigrants identify instead with their own respective ethnicities (~95%). Immigrants from some Caribbean, Central American and South American nations and their descendants may or may not also self-identify with the term.

Recent surveys of African Americans using a genetic testing service have found varied ancestries that show different tendencies by region and sex of ancestors. These studies found that on average, African Americans have 73.2–80.9% West African, 18–24% European, and 0.8–0.9% Native American genetic heritage, with large variation between individuals.

According to studies in the Journal of Personality and Social Psychology, U.S. residents consistently overestimate the size, physical strength, and formidability of young black men.

=== New Great Migration ===
The New Great Migration is not evenly distributed throughout the South. As with the earlier Great Migration, the New Great Migration is primarily directed toward cities and large urban areas, such as Atlanta, Charlotte, Houston, Dallas, Raleigh, Washington, D.C., Tampa, Virginia Beach, San Antonio, Memphis, Orlando, Nashville, Jacksonville, and so forth. North Carolina's Charlotte metro area in particular, is a hot spot for African American migrants in the US. Between 1975 and 1980, Charlotte saw a net gain of 2,725 African Americans in the area. This number continued to rise as between 1985 and 1990 as the area had a net gain of 7,497 African Americans, and from 1995 to 2000 the net gain was 23,313 African Americans.

This rise in net gain points to Atlanta, Charlotte, Dallas, and Houston being a growing hot spots for the migrants of The New Great Migration. The percentage of Black Americans who live in the South has been increasing since 1990, and the biggest gains have been in the region's large urban areas, according to census data. The Black population of metro Atlanta more than doubled between 1990 and 2020, surpassing 2 million in the most recent census. The Black population also more than doubled in metro Charlotte while Greater Houston and Dallas-Fort Worth both saw their Black populations surpass 1 million for the first time. Several smaller metro areas also saw sizable gains, including San Antonio; Raleigh and Greensboro, N.C.; and Orlando. Primary destinations are states that have the most job opportunities, especially Georgia, North Carolina, Maryland, Virginia, Tennessee, Florida and Texas. Other southern states, including Mississippi, Louisiana, South Carolina, Alabama and Arkansas, have seen little net growth in the African American population from return migration.

==== One-drop rule ====
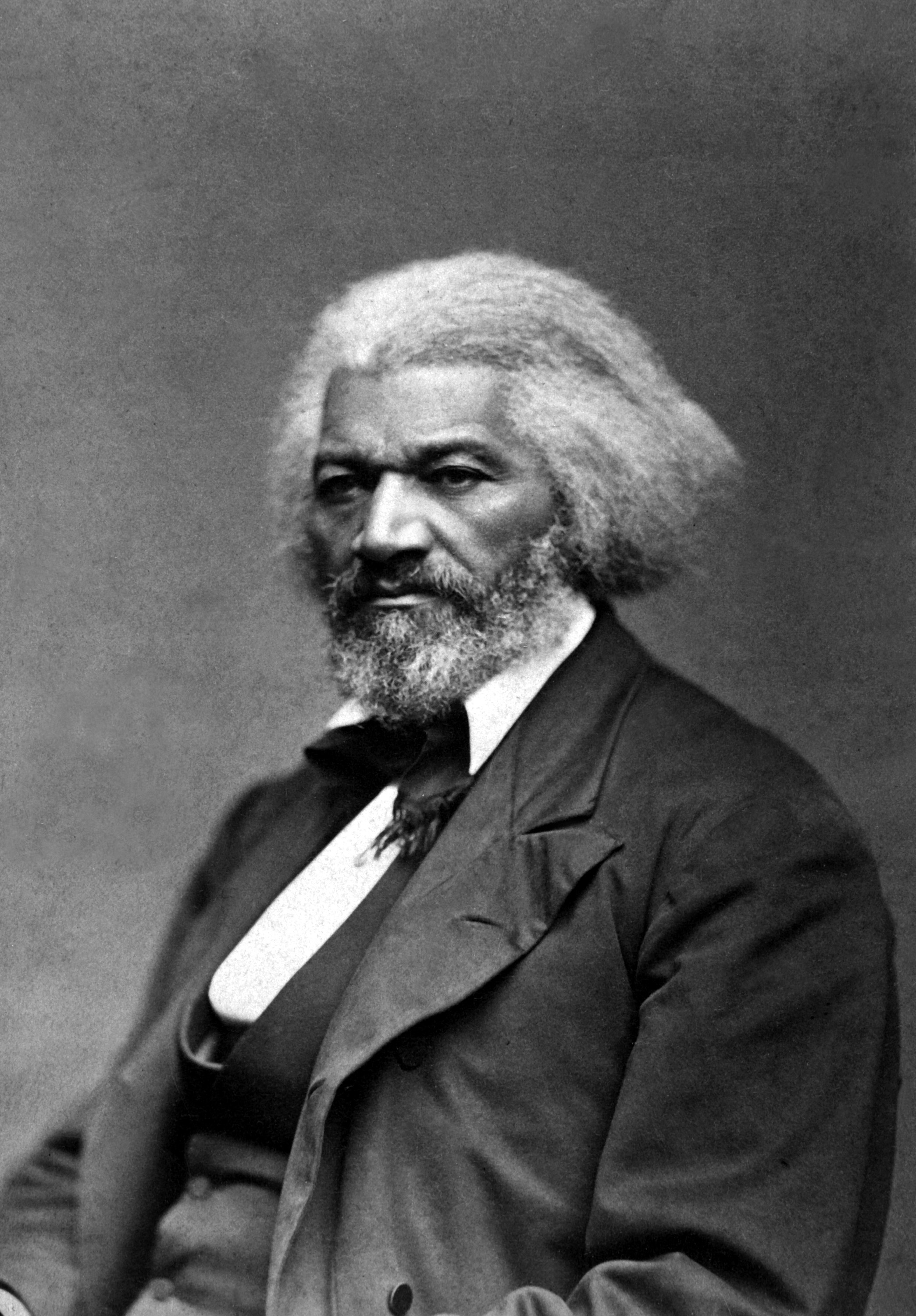
Multiracial social reformer Frederick Douglass

From the late 19th century, the South used a colloquial term, the one-drop rule, to classify as black a person of any known African ancestry. This practice of hypodescent was not put into law until the early 20th century. Legally, the definition varied from state to state. Racial definition was more flexible in the 18th and 19th centuries before the American Civil War. For instance, President Thomas Jefferson held in slavery persons who were legally white (less than 25% black) according to Virginia law at the time, but, because they were born to slave mothers, they were born into slavery, according to the principle of partus sequitur ventrem, which Virginia adopted into law in 1662.

Outside of the United States, some other countries have adopted the one-drop rule, but the definition of who is black and the extent to which the one-drop "rule" applies varies greatly from country to country.

The one-drop rule may have originated as a means of increasing the number of black slaves and was maintained as an attempt to keep the white race "pure". One of the results of the one-drop rule was the uniting of the African-American community. Some of the most prominent abolitionists and civil-rights activists of the 19th century were multiracial, such as Frederick Douglass, Robert Purvis and James Mercer Langston. They advocated equality for all.

==== Blackness ====
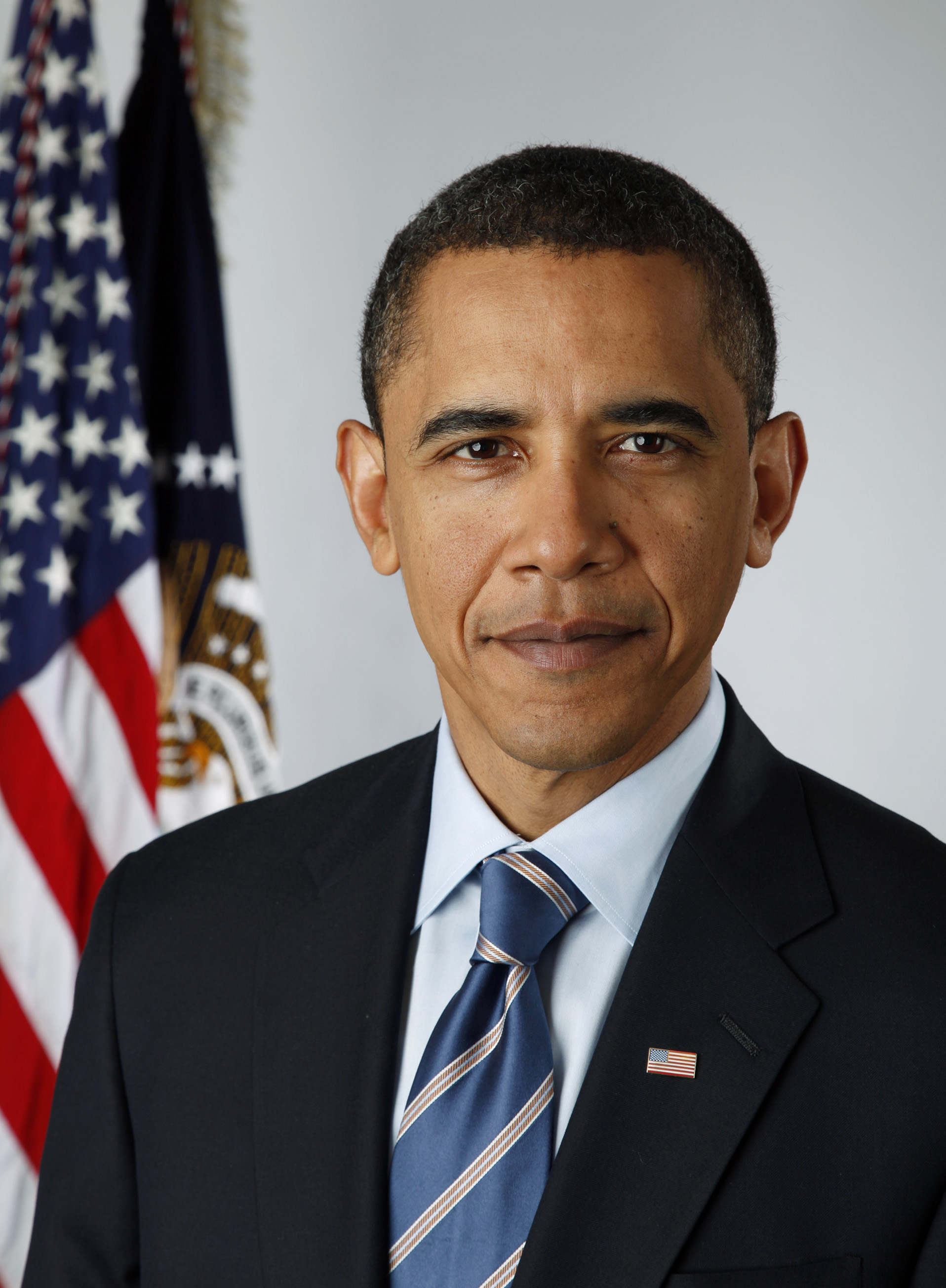
Barack Obama—the first person of color, biracial, and self-identified African American President of the United States—was throughout his campaign criticized as being either "too black" or "not black enough".

The concept of blackness in the United States has been described as the degree to which one associates themselves with mainstream African-American culture, politics, and values. To a certain extent, this concept is not so much about race but more about political orientation, culture and behavior. Blackness can be contrasted with "acting white", where black Americans are said to behave with assumed characteristics of stereotypical white Americans with regard to fashion, dialect, taste in music, and possibly, from the perspective of a significant number of black youth, academic achievement.

Due to the often political and cultural contours of blackness in the United States, the notion of blackness can also be extended to non-black people. Toni Morrison once described Bill Clinton as the first black President of the United States, because, as she put it, he displayed "almost every trope of blackness". Clinton welcomed the label.

The question of blackness also arose in Barack Obama's 2008 presidential campaign. Commentators questioned whether Obama, who was elected the first president with black ancestry, was "black enough", contending that his background is not typical because his mother was a white American and his father was a black student visitor from Kenya. Obama chose to identify as black and African American.

=== Mexico ===
Racial groups in Mexico (2020 census)
1. Blacks (2.04%)
2. Other groups (98.0%)

The 2015 preliminary survey to the 2020 census allowed Afro-Mexicans to self-identify for the first time in Mexico and recorded a total of 1.4 million (1.2% of the total Mexican population). The majority of Afro-Mexicans live in the Costa Chica of Guerrero region.

== Caribbean ==
=== Dominican Republic ===
The first Afro-Dominican slaves were shipped to the Dominican Republic by Spanish conquistadors during the Transatlantic slave trade.

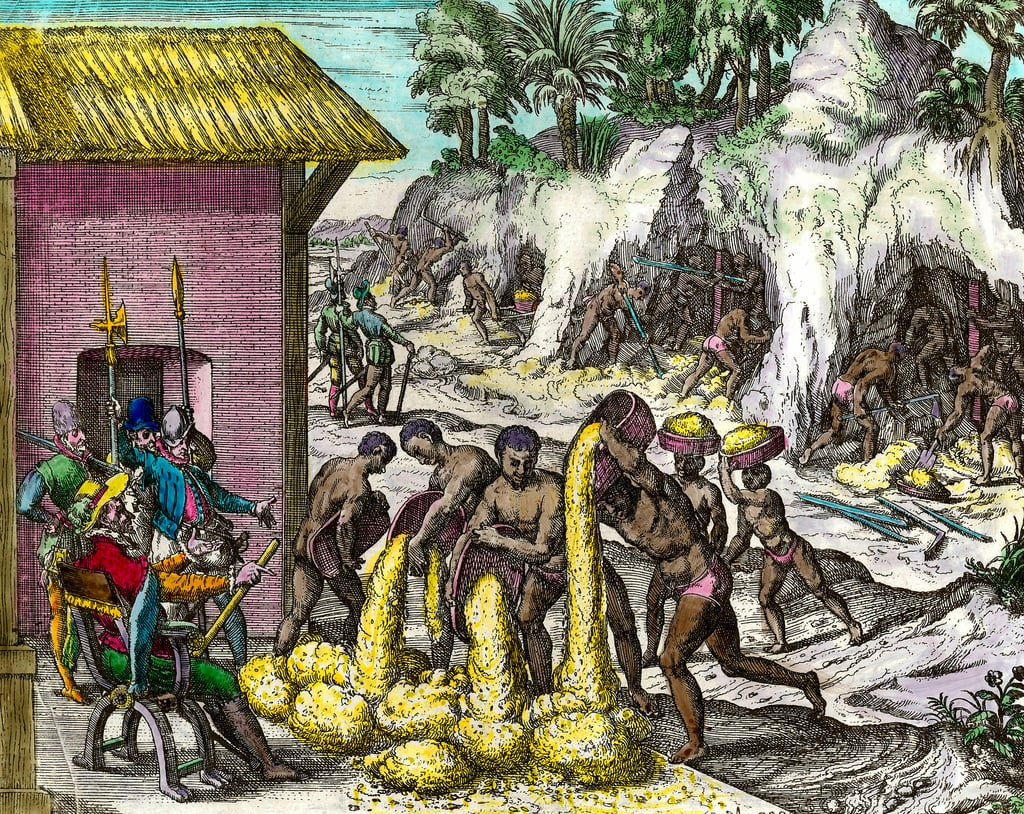
African slaves harvesting gold for Spanish colonists in Hispaniola, 16th-century engraving by Théodore de Bry

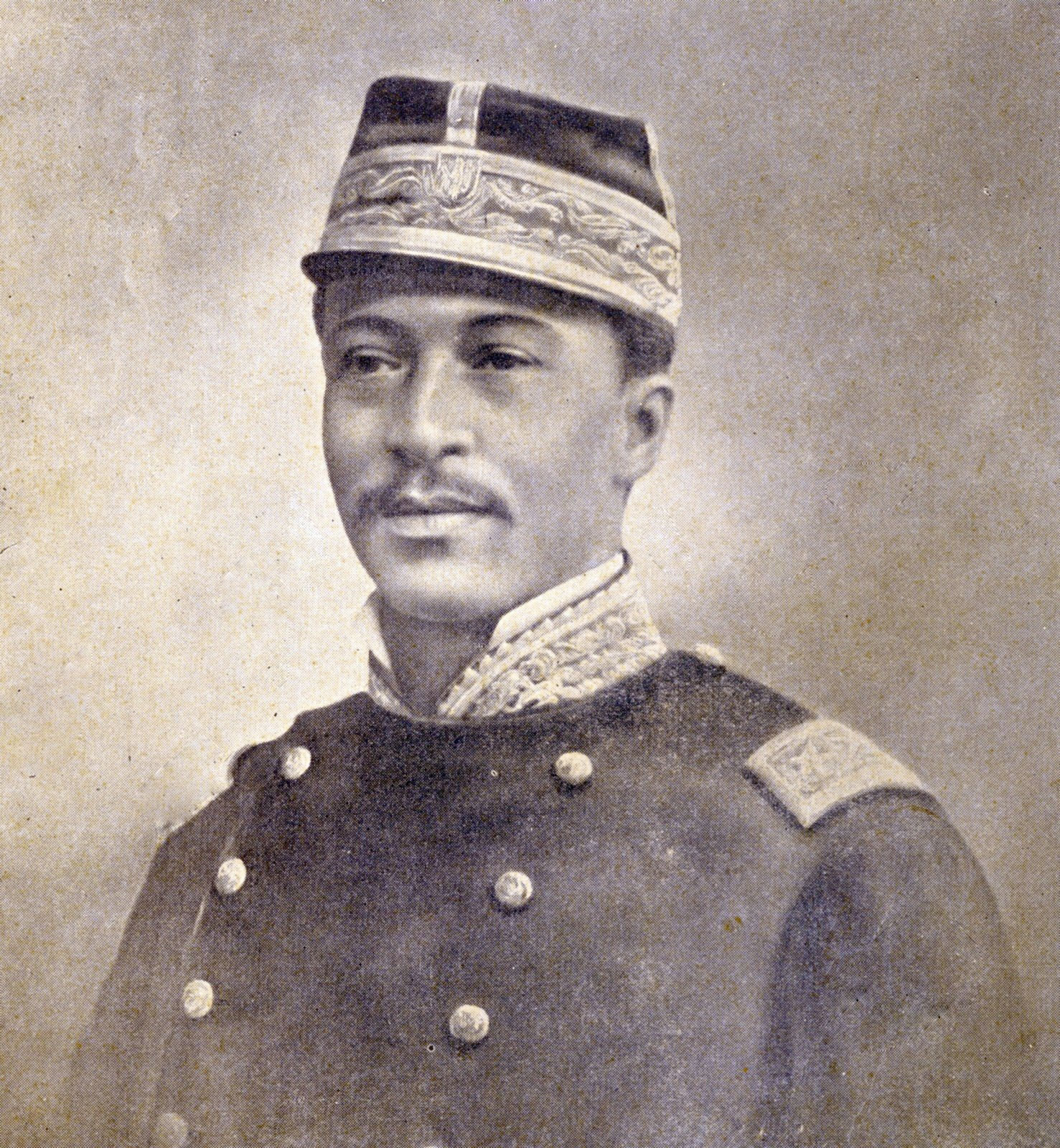
General Gregorio Luperón, son of a Spanish Dominican and a black migrant from the Anglo-Caribbean.

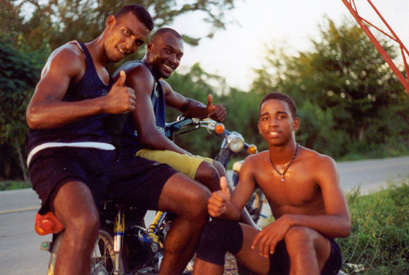
Black Dominicans in Bayahibe

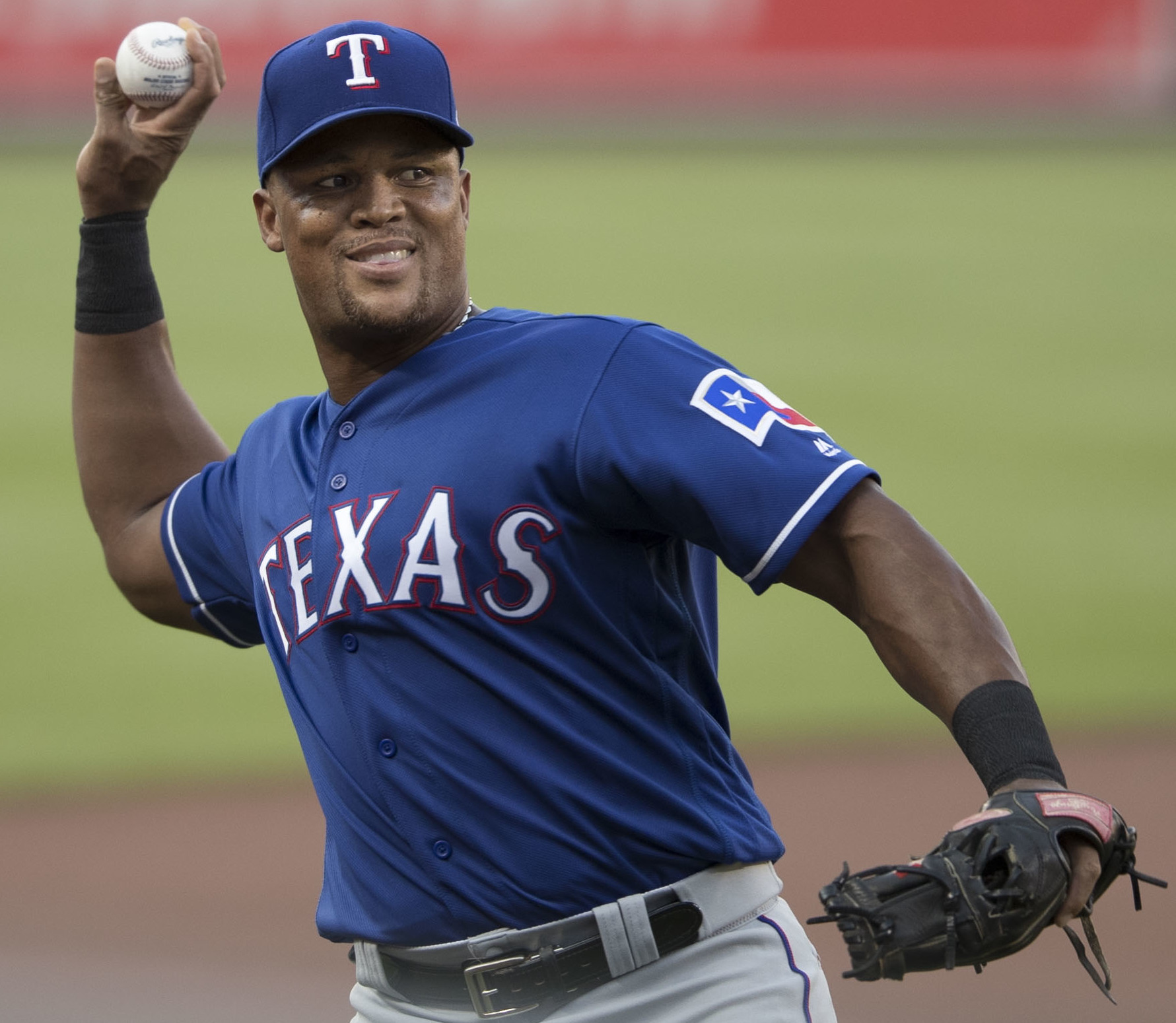
Adrián Beltré Pérez, professional baseball player.

=== Haiti ===
In 2012, the Republic of Haiti became the first non-African country to join the African Union as an observer member.

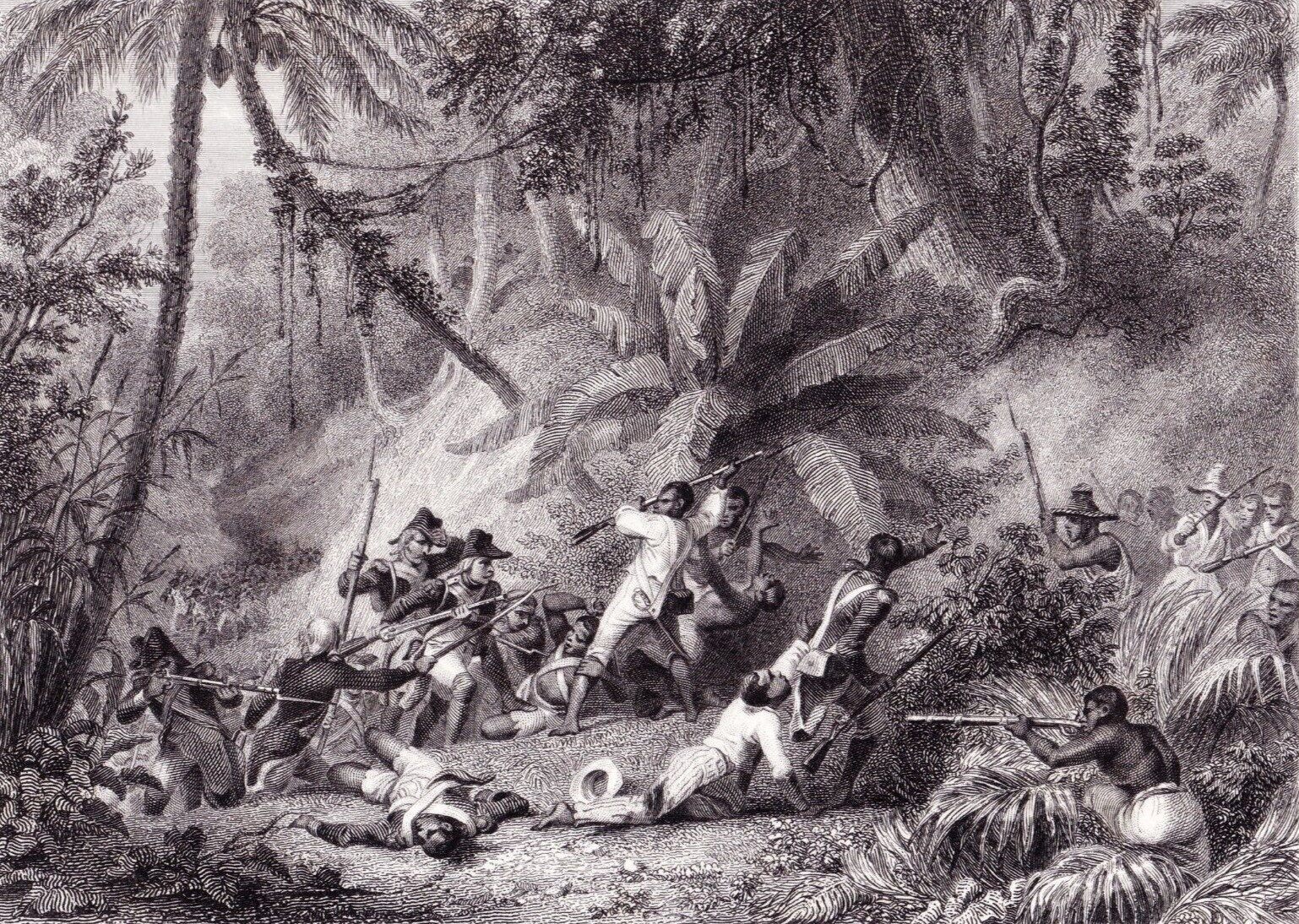
Battles between Napoleonic soldiers and insurgents from Saint-Domingue during the Haitian Revolution (1791-1804).

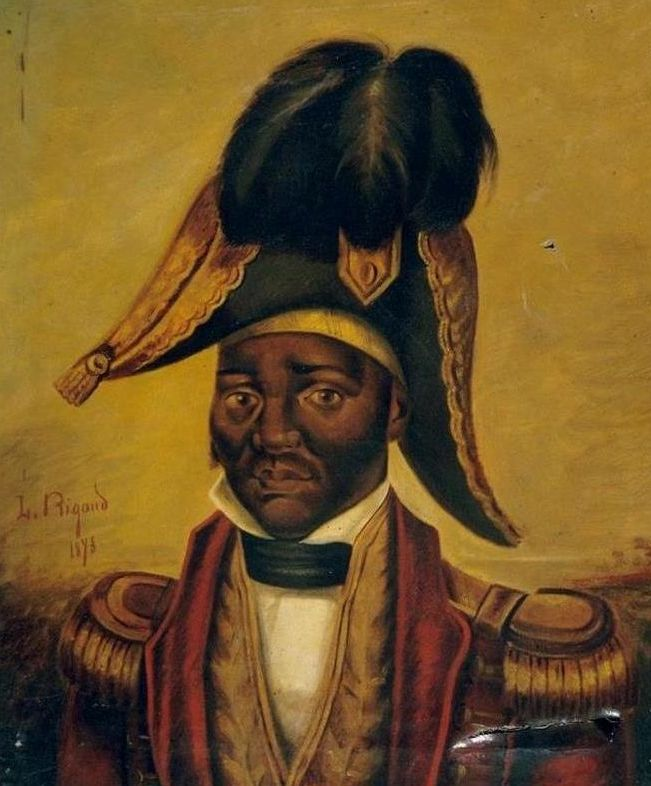
Revolutionary Jean-Jacques Dessalines

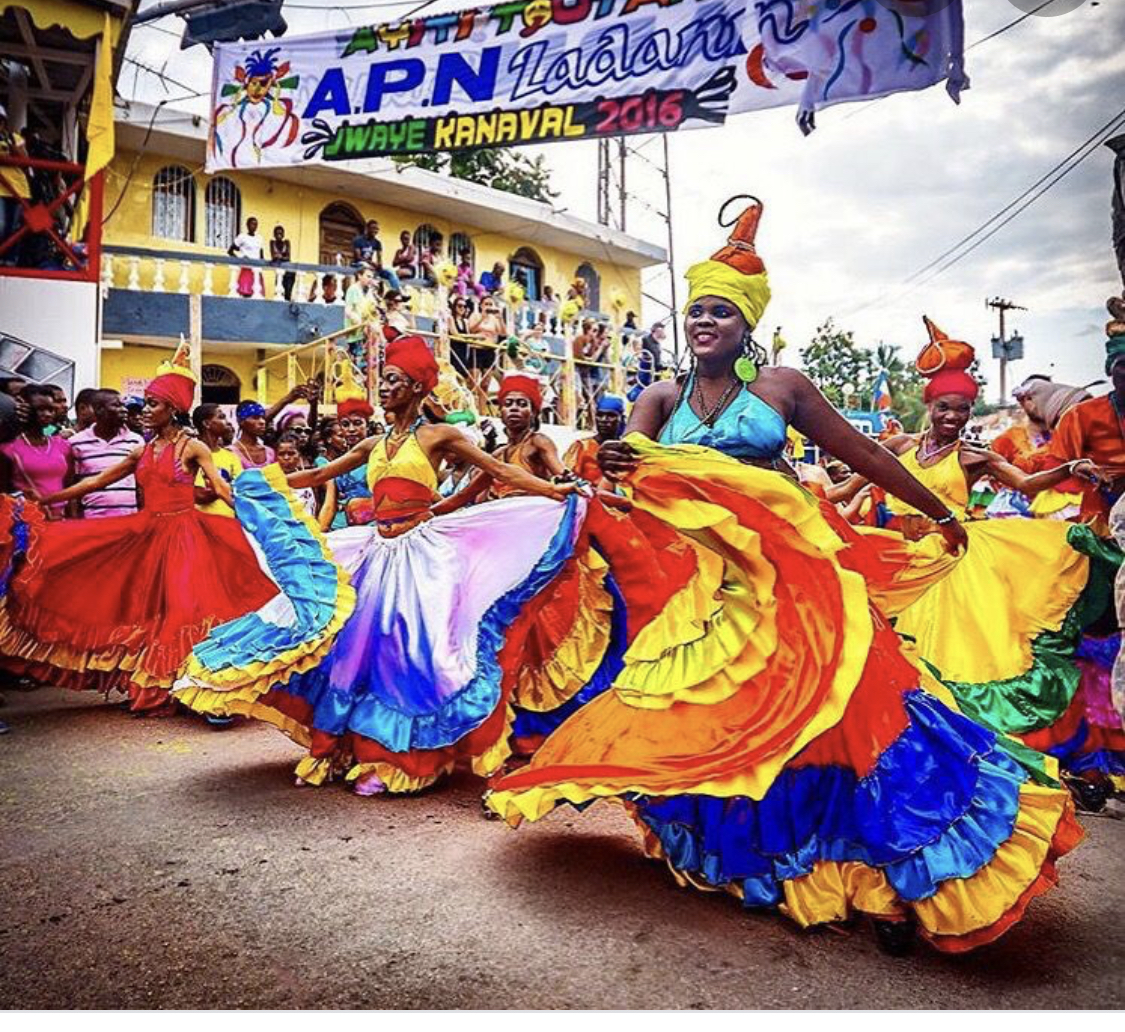
Haitian Carnival (Kanaval)

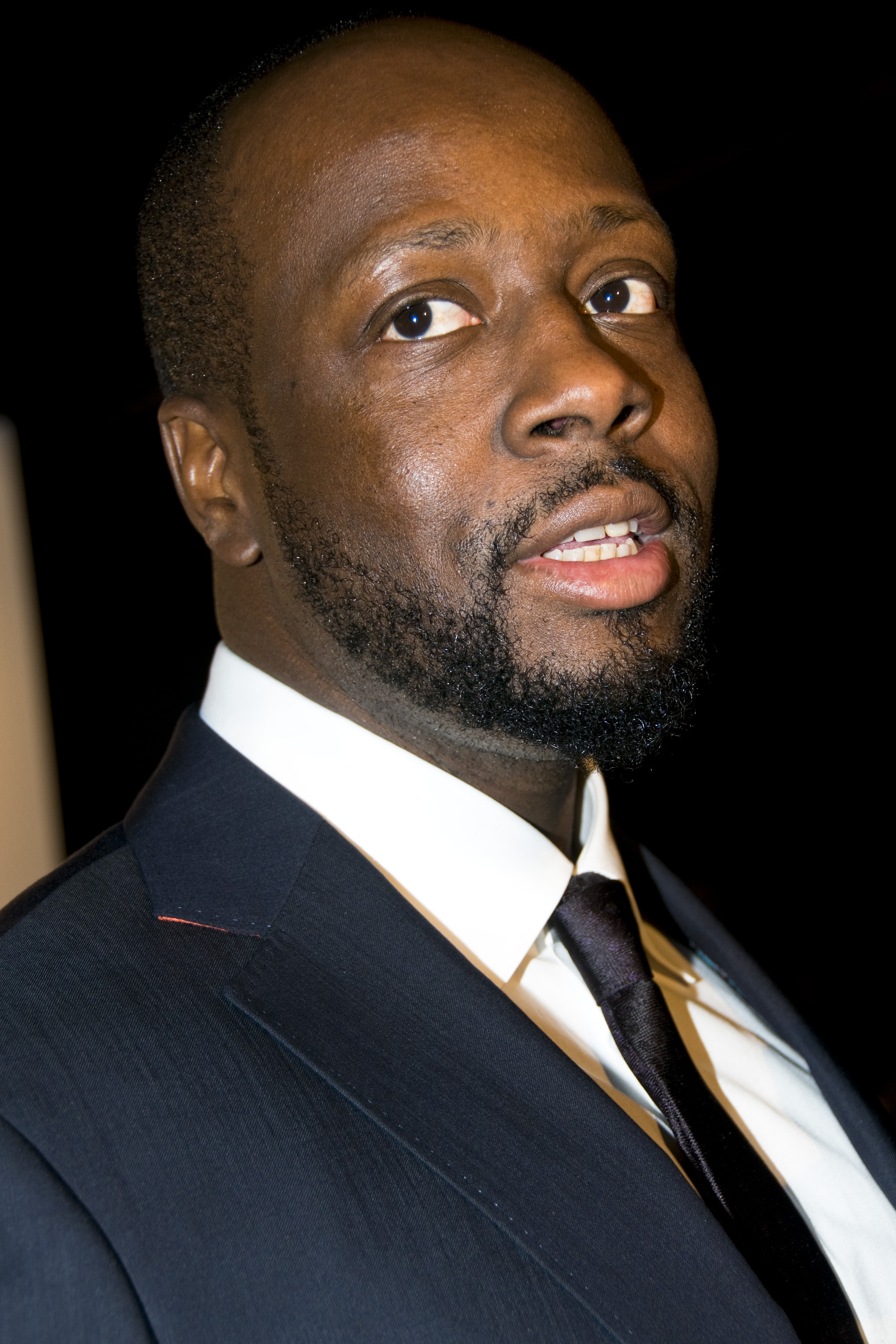
Rapper Wyclef Jean

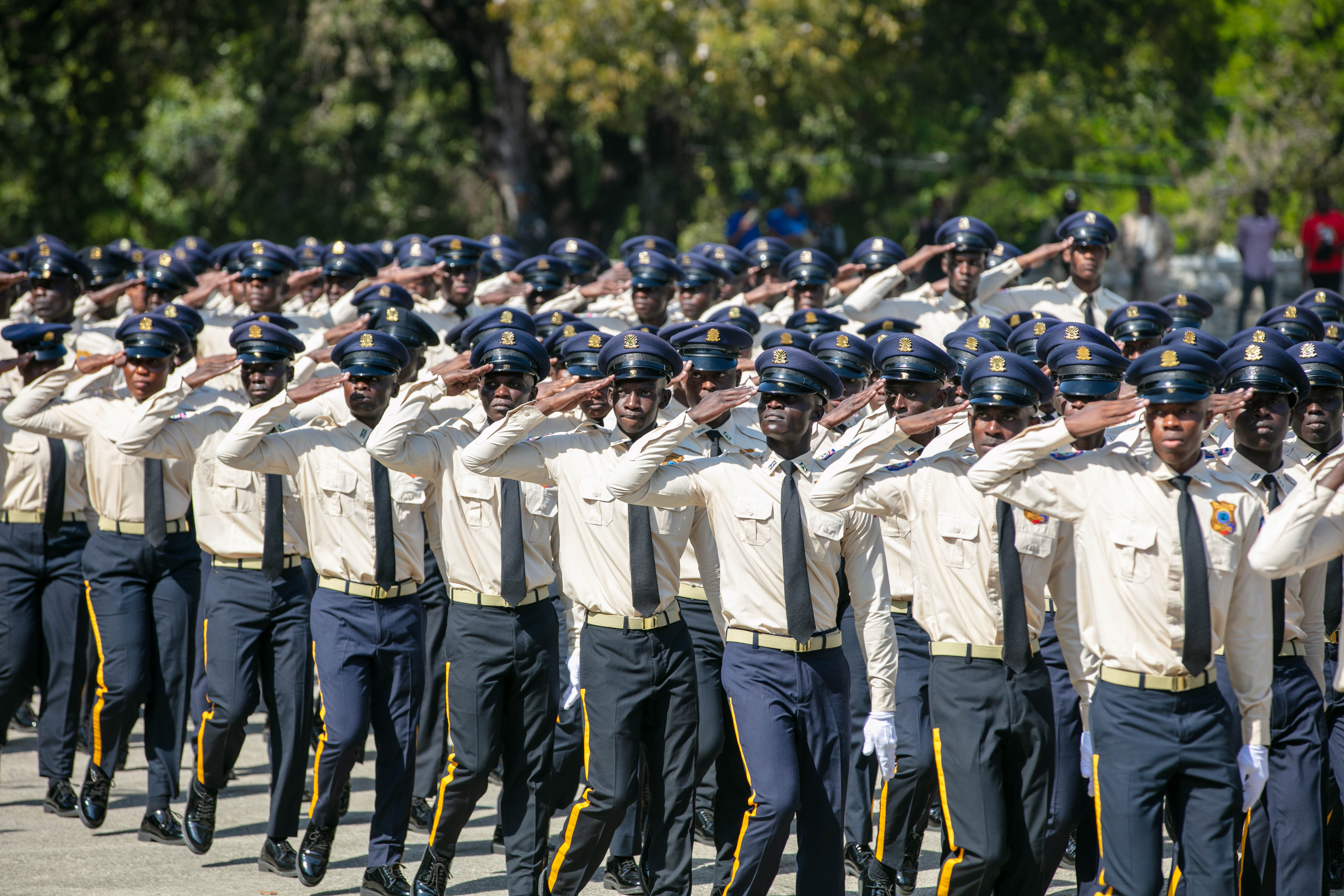
Newly graduated Haitian National Police officers in 2025

=== Puerto Rico ===
Spanish conquistadors shipped slaves from West Africa to Puerto Rico. Afro–Puerto Ricans in part trace ancestry to this colonization of the island.

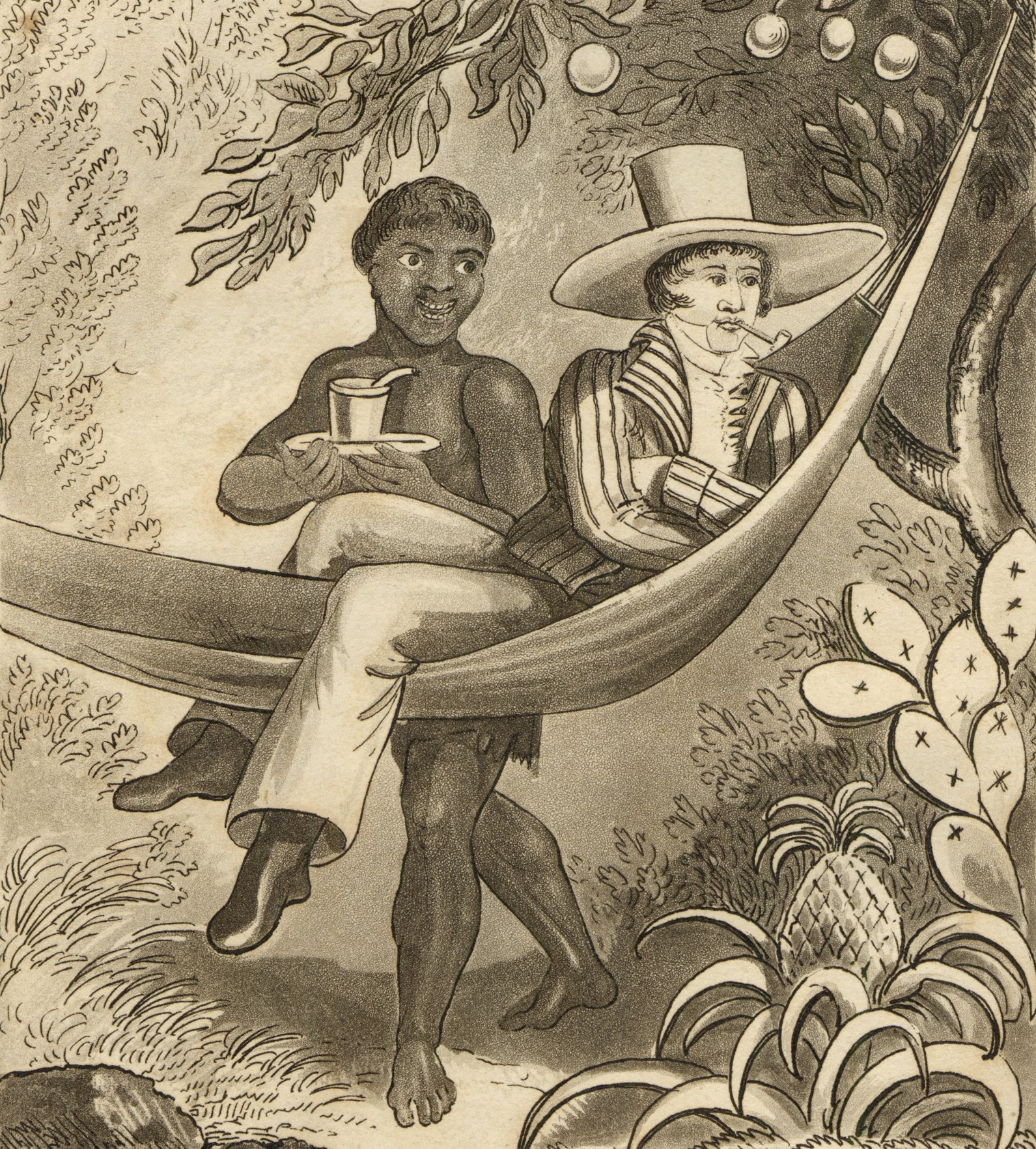
Spanish Planter of Puerto Rico with House Slave, ca.1808

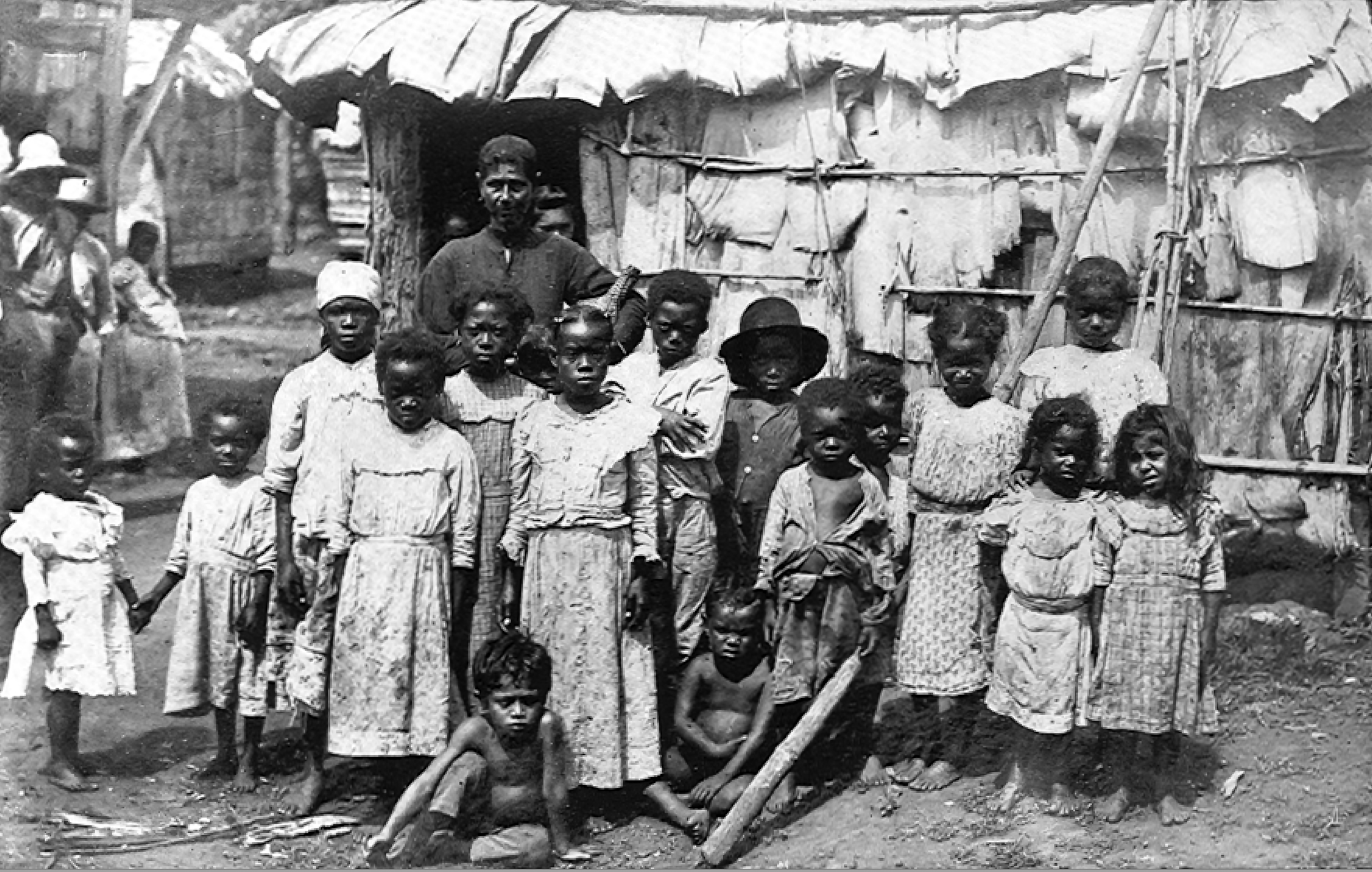
Peones in Puerto Rico, 1898

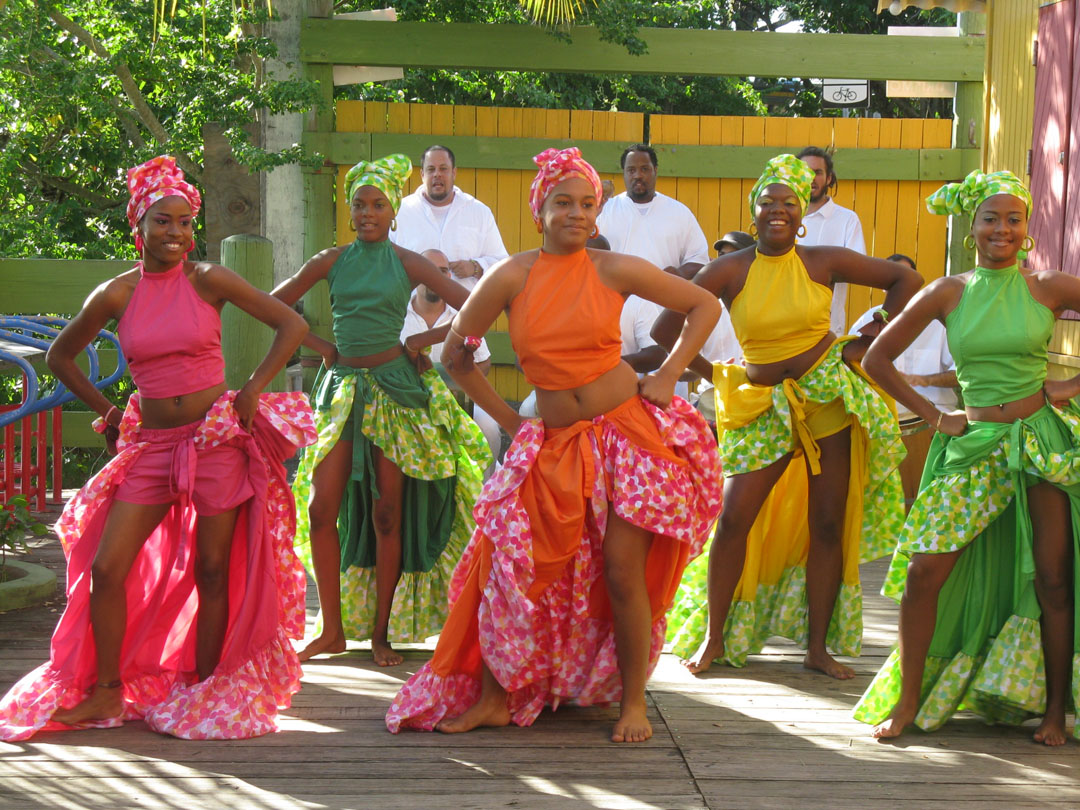
Afro-Puerto Rican women in Bomba dance wear

== South America ==
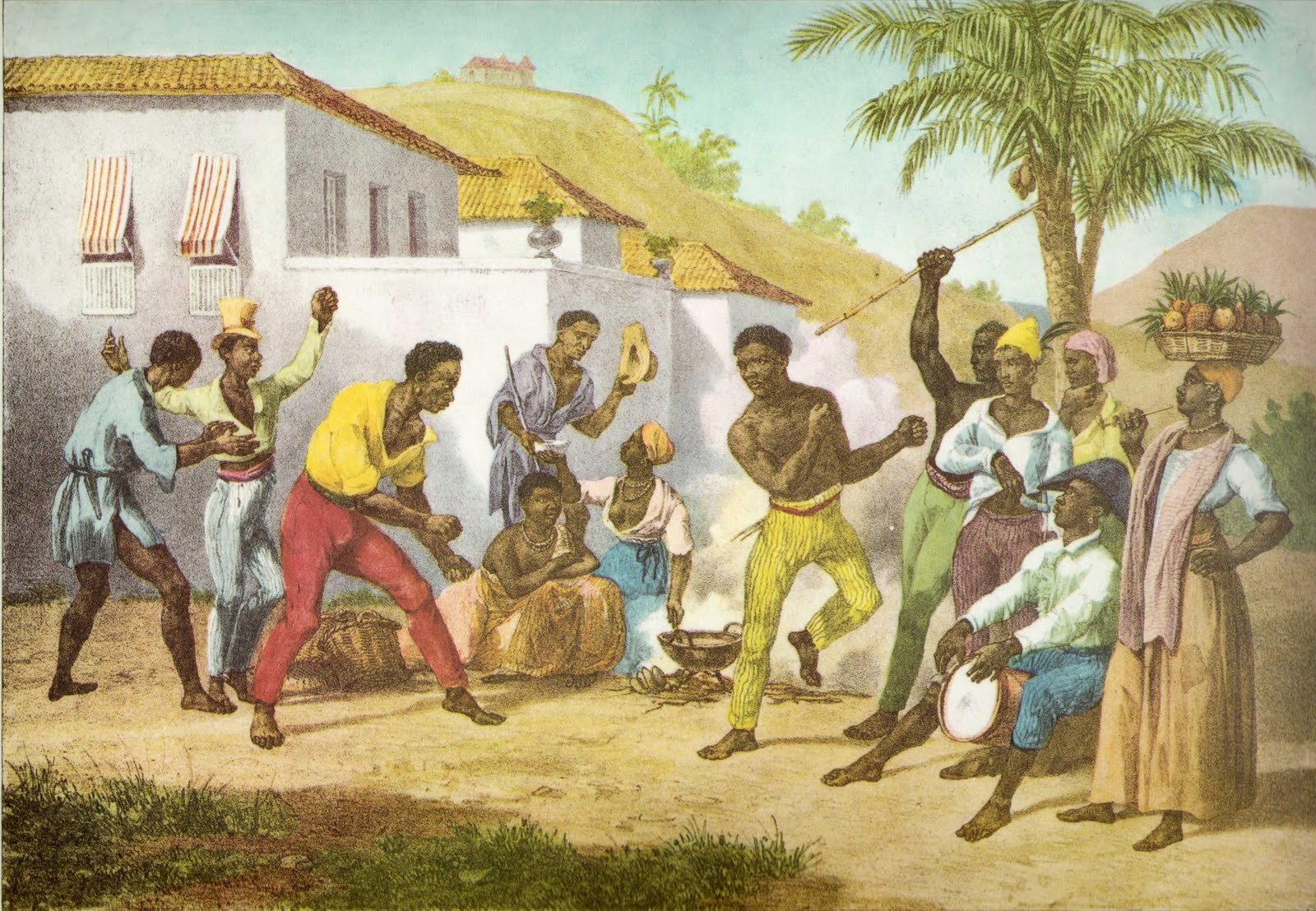
Capoeira, an Afro-Brazilian martial art

Approximately 12 million people were shipped from Africa to the Americas during the Atlantic slave trade from 1492 to 1888. Of these, 11.5 million of those shipped to South America and the Caribbean. Brazil was the largest importer in the Americas, with 5.5 million African slaves imported, followed by the British Caribbean with 2.76 million, the Spanish Caribbean and Spanish Mainland with 1.59 million Africans, and the French Caribbean with 1.32 million. Today their descendants number approximately 150 million in South America and the Caribbean. In addition to skin color, other physical characteristics such as facial features and hair texture are often variously used in classifying peoples as black in South America and the Caribbean. In South America and the Caribbean, classification as black is also closely tied to social status and socioeconomic variables, especially in light of social conceptions of "blanqueamiento" (racial whitening) and related concepts.

=== Brazil ===
Racial groups in Brazil (2022 census)
1. Blacks (10.2%)
2. Other groups (89.8%)

The concept of race in Brazil is complex. A Brazilian child was never automatically identified with the racial type of one or both of their parents, nor were there only two categories to choose from. Between an individual of unmixed West African ancestry and a very light mulatto individual, more than a dozen racial categories were acknowledged, based on various combinations of hair color, hair texture, eye color, and skin color. These types grade into each other like the colors of the spectrum, and no one category stands significantly isolated from the rest. In Brazil, people are classified by appearance, not heredity.

Scholars disagree over the effects of social status on racial classifications in Brazil. It is generally believed that achieving upward mobility and education results in individuals being classified as a category of lighter skin. The popular claim is that in Brazil, poor whites are considered black and wealthy blacks are considered white. Some scholars disagree, arguing that "whitening" of one's social status may be open to people of mixed race, a large part of the population known as pardo, but a person perceived as preto (black) will continue to be classified as black regardless of wealth or social status.

==== Statistics ====
Brazilian Population, by Race, from 1872 to 1991 (Census Data)
Ethnic group	White	Black	Brown	Yellow (East Asian)	Undeclared	Total
1872	3,787,289	1,954,452	4,188,737	–	–	9,930,478
1940	26,171,778	6,035,869	8,744,365	242,320	41,983	41,236,315
1991	75,704,927	7,335,136	62,316,064	630,656	534,878	146,521,661

Demographics of Brazil
Year	White	Pardo	Black
1835	24.4%	18.2%	51.4%
2000	53.7%	38.5%	6.2%
2010	48.4%	42.4%	6.7%

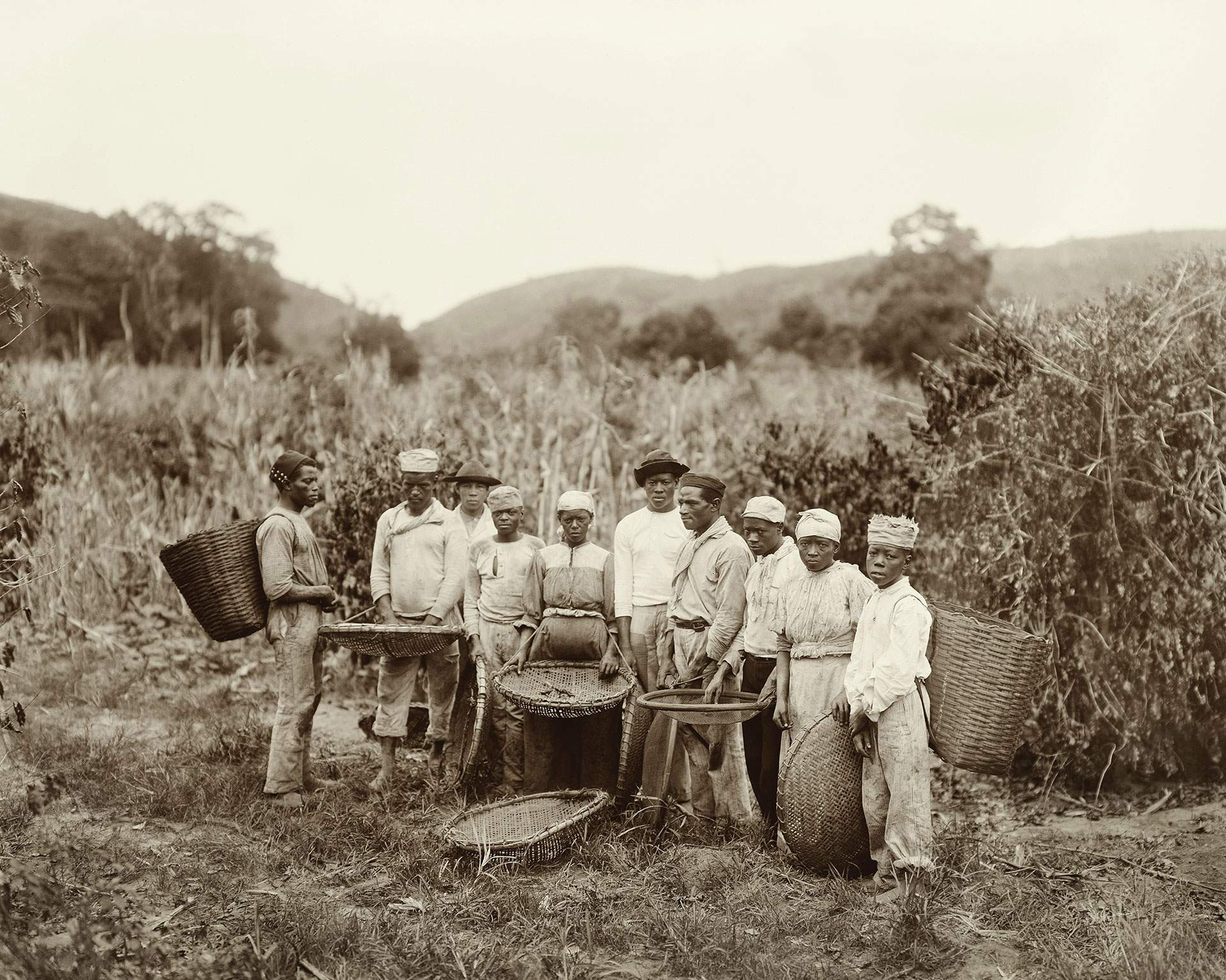
Enslaved people working on a Brazilian coffee plantation, c.1882

From the years 1500 to 1850, an estimated 3.5 million captives were forcibly shipped from West/Central Africa to Brazil. The territory received the highest number of slaves of any country in the Americas. Scholars estimate that more than half of the Brazilian population is at least in part descended from these individuals. Brazil has the largest population of Afro-ancestry outside Africa. In contrast to the US, during the slavery period and after, the Portuguese colonial government in Brazil and the later Brazilian government did not pass formal anti-miscegenation or segregation laws. As in other Latin American countries, intermarriage was prevalent during the colonial period and continued afterward. In addition, people of mixed race (pardo) often tended to marry white spouses, and their descendants became accepted as white. As a result, some of the European descended population also has West African or Amerindian blood. According to the last census of the 20th century, in which Brazilians could choose from five color/ethnic categories with which they identified, 54% of individuals identified as white, 6.2% identified as black, and 39.5% identified as pardo (brown)—a broad multi-racial category, including tri-racial persons.

In the 19th century, a philosophy of racial whitening emerged in Brazil, related to the assimilation of mixed-race people into the white population through intermarriage. Until recently the government did not keep data on race. However, statisticians estimate that in 1835, roughly 50% of the population was preto (black; most were enslaved), a further 20% was pardo (brown), and 25% white, with the remainder Amerindian. Some classified as pardo were tri-racial.

By the 2000 census, demographic changes including the end to slavery, immigration from Europe and Asia, assimilation of multiracial persons, and other factors resulted in a population in which 6.2% of the population identified as black, 40% as pardo, and 55% as white. Essentially most of the black population was absorbed into the multi-racial category by intermixing. A 2007 genetic study found that at least 29% of the middle-class, white Brazilian population had some recent (since 1822 and the end of the colonial period) African ancestry.

==== Race relations in Brazil ====
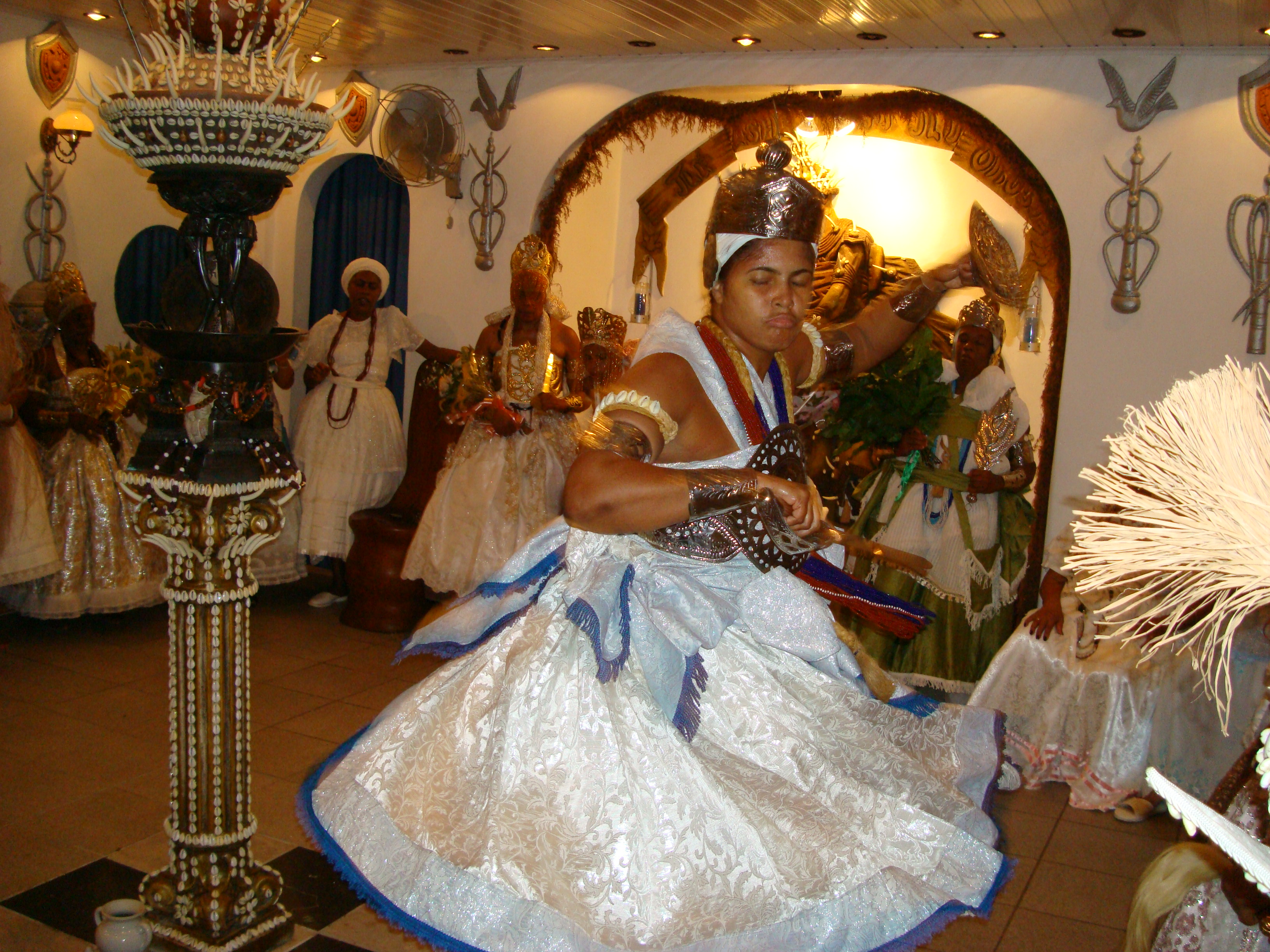
Brazilian Candomblé ceremony

According to the 2022 census, 10.2% of Brazilians said they were black, compared with 7.6% in 2010, and 45.3% said they were racially mixed, up from 43.1%, while the proportion of self-declared white Brazilians has fallen from 47.7% to 43.5%. Activists from Brazil's Black movement attribute the racial shift in the population to a growing sense of pride among African-descended Brazilians in recognising and celebrating their ancestry.

The philosophy of the racial democracy in Brazil has drawn some criticism, based on economic issues. Brazil has one of the largest gaps in income distribution in the world. The richest 10% of the population earn 28 times the average income of the bottom 40%. The richest 10 percent is almost exclusively white or predominantly European in ancestry. One-third of the population lives under the poverty line, with blacks and other people of color accounting for 70 percent of the poor.

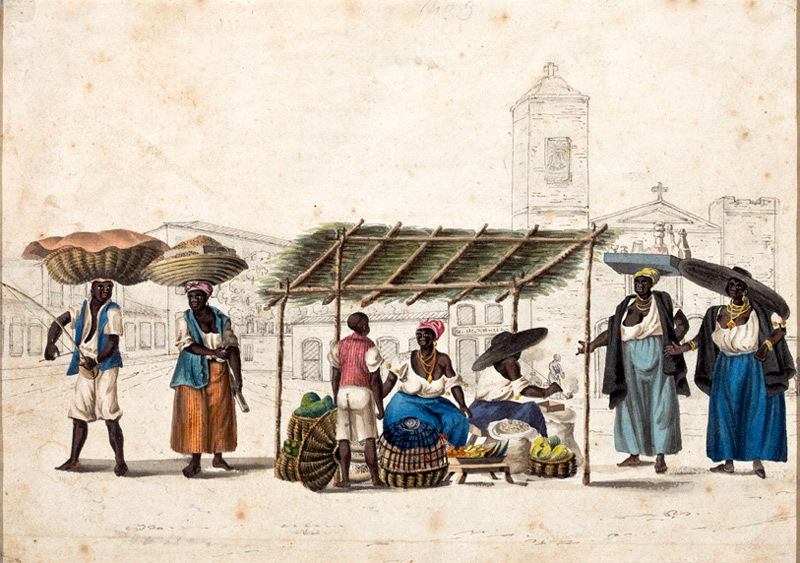
Fruit sellers in Rio de Janeiro, c. 1820

In 2015 United States, African Americans, including multiracial people, earned 76.8% as much as white people. By contrast, black and mixed race Brazilians earned on average 58% as much as whites in 2014. The gap in income between blacks and other non-whites is relatively small compared to the large gap between whites and all people of color. Other social factors, such as illiteracy and education levels, show the same patterns of disadvantage for people of color.

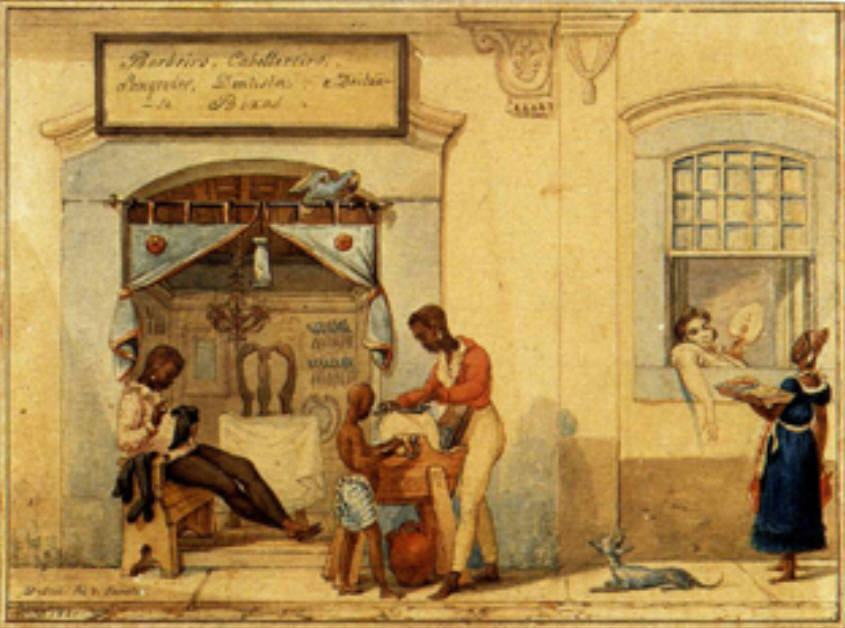
Black people in Brazil, c. 1821

Some commentators observe that the United States practice of segregation and white supremacy in the South, and discrimination in many areas outside that region, forced many African Americans to unite in the civil rights struggle, whereas the fluid nature of race in Brazil has divided individuals of African ancestry between those with more or less ancestry and helped sustain an image of the country as an example of post-colonial harmony. This has hindered the development of a common identity among black Brazilians.

Though Brazilians of at least partial African heritage make up a large percentage of the population, few blacks have been elected as politicians. The city of Salvador, Bahia, for instance, is 80% people of color, but voters have not elected a mayor of color.

Patterns of discrimination against non-whites have led some academic and other activists to advocate for use of the Portuguese term negro to encompass all African-descended people, in order to stimulate a "black" consciousness and identity.

=== Colombia ===
Racial groups in Colombia (2018 census)
1. Blacks (9.34%)
2. Other groups (90.7%)

Afro-Colombians are the third-largest African diaspora population in Latin America after Afro-Brazilians and Afro-Haitians.

=== Venezuela ===
Most black Venezuelans descend from people brought as slaves to Venezuela directly from Africa during colonization; others have been descendants of immigrants from the Antilles and Colombia. Many blacks were part of the independence movement, and several managed to be heroes. There is a deep-rooted heritage of African culture in Venezuelan culture, as demonstrated in many traditional Venezuelan music and dances, such as the Tambor, a musical genre inherited from black members of the colony, or the Llanera music or the Gaita zuliana that both are a fusion of all the three major peoples that contribute to the cultural heritage. Also, black inheritance is present in the country's gastronomy.

There are entire communities of blacks in the Barlovento zone, as well as part of the Bolívar state and in other small towns; they also live peaceably among the general population in the rest of Venezuela. Currently, blacks represent a plurality of the Venezuelan population, although many are actually mixed people.

== See also ==
- African diaspora
- Afrophobia
- Black elite
- Black supremacy
- Black women
- Lists of black people
- Mulatto
- Negrito
- San Basilio de Palenque – the first free African town in the Americas
- Scientific racism
- Zambo
