= List of UCLA School of Theater, Film and Television alumni =

This is a list of alumni of the UCLA School of Theater, Film and Television.

- Shane Acker, filmmaker, 9
- Corey Allen, actor, film director, writer, television director, and producer, Rebel Without a Cause
- Ana Lily Amirpour, filmmaker, A Girl Walks Home Alone at Night
- Allison Anders, filmmaker, Gas, Food, Lodging
- Roger Andrieux, filmmaker, producer, cinematographer, editor, Mister Brown
- M. K. Asante, author, Buck: A Memoir, filmmaker, The Black Candle, executive producer, While Black with MK Asante
- Jacoba Atlas, television executive, senior producer at NBC News and TBS, vice president at CNN and PBS
- Danilo Bach, writer, Beverly Hills Cop
- Carroll Ballard, director, Fly Away Home
- Beth Behrs, actress, 2 Broke Girls, The Neighborhood
- Harve Bennett, producer, Star Trek
- Corbin Bernsen, actor, Psych, L.A. Law
- Jeff Berry, historian and author
- Bruce Bilson, director, Get Smart
- Dustin Lance Black, screenwriter, J. Edgar, Milk
- Jack Black, actor, Kung Fu Panda, School of Rock
- Shane Black, writer/director, Lethal Weapon, Iron Man 3
- Thomas Bliss, producer
- Carol Burnett, comedian
- Charles Burnett, filmmaker, To Sleep with Anger
- Stephen H. Burum, cinematographer, Mission: Impossible
- Giacun Caduff, producer of La femme et le TGV
- Sheila Callaghan, writer/producer, Shameless
- Patricia Cardoso, filmmaker, Real Women Have Curves
- Nancy Cartwright, voice actress, The Simpsons
- Kerem Çatay, film producer, Ay Yapim
- Migdia Chinea, writer, The Incredible Hulk
- Bert Convy, game show host, Tattletales, Super Password, actor and singer
- Francis Ford Coppola, filmmaker, The Godfather franchise
- Alex Cox, filmmaker, Fear and Loathing in Las Vegas
- Steve Cuden, screenwriter, Jekyll & Hyde musical
- Dean Cundey, cinematographer, Apollo 13
- Julie Dash, filmmaker, Daughters of the Dust
- Jonathan Dayton, director, Little Miss Sunshine, Ruby Sparks
- James Dean, actor, Rebel Without a Cause
- Joyce DeWitt, actress, Three's Company
- Jesse Draper, actress, talk show host, The Valley Girl Show
- Moctesuma Esparza, producer, Gettysburg
- Jamaa Fanaka, filmmaker, Penitentiary
- Valerie Faris, director, Little Miss Sunshine, Ruby Sparks
- Teshome Gabriel, cinema scholar and professor at the UCLA School of Theater, Film and Television, expert on cinema in Africa and the developing world
- Ayn Carrillo Gailey, writer, Nice Girl Like You
- Sacha Gervasi, filmmaker, Hitchcock
- Alex Gibney, filmmaker, Going Clear: Scientology and the Prison of Belief
- Geoffrey Gilmore, director, Tribeca Film Festival
- Maria Giese, director, activist for women directors, When Saturday Comes
- Joanna Gleason, actress, The Wedding Planner
- Dan Gordon, screenwriter, The Hurricane
- Christopher Gorham, actor, Covert Affairs
- Alex Hakobian, filmmaking teacher at Grant High School in Los Angeles
- Kristin Hanggi, Broadway director, Rock of Ages
- Catherine Hardwicke, director, Twilight
- Mariska Hargitay, actress, Law & Order: Special Victims Unit
- Marielle Heller, director, A Beautiful Day in the Neighborhood, Can You Ever Forgive Me?, The Diary of a Teenage Girl
- Felicia D. Henderson, writer/producer, Fringe, Gossip Girl
- Jim Herzfeld, screenwriter, Meet the Fockers
- Colin Higgins, screenwriter, The Best Little Whorehouse in Texas
- Michael Hitchcock, actor/writer, Glee
- Todd Holland, showrunner, Malcolm in the Middle
- Usmar Ismail, director, Lewat Djam Malam
- Randall Jahnson, screenwriter, The Doors
- Anne-Marie Johnson, actress, What's Happening Now!!
- Laeta Kalogridis, writer/producer, Terminator Genisys
- Judy Kaye, Broadway actress
- Nietzchka Keene, director, The Juniper Tree
- Gil Kenan, director, Poltergeist
- Matthew Kennedy, writer, Roadshow! The Fall of Film Musicals in the 1960s
- David Koepp, screenwriter, Jurassic Park, Spider-Man, Mission Impossible
- Scott Kosar, writer, The Machinist
- Neil Landau, writer, Don't Tell Mom the Babysitter's Dead
- Deborah Nadoolman Landis, costume designer, Coming to America, Michael Jackson's "Thriller"
- Janet Leahy, executive producer, Mad Men
- Justin Lin, filmmaker, Fast & Furious 6
- Erica Lindbeck, voice actress
- Russell Mael, singer-songwriter, Sparks
- S. J. Main Muñoz, television and film director, American Horror Stories
- Ray Manzarek, keyboardist, The Doors
- Courtney Marsh, filmmaker, Chau, Beyond the Lines
- Steve Martin, actor/writer, It's Complicated, L.A. Story
- Ramón Menéndez, writer/director, Stand and Deliver
- Jim Morrison, lead singer and lyricist, The Doors
- Gregory Nava, filmmaker, American Family
- Victor Nuñez, filmmaker, Ulee's Gold
- Alexander Payne, filmmaker, Nebraska, The Descendants
- Nasim Pedrad, comedian, Saturday Night Live
- Robert Roy Pool, writer, Armageddon
- Doug Pray, filmmaker, Levitated Mass
- Gina Prince-Bythewood, filmmaker, Beyond the Lights, The Secret Lives of Bees
- John Rando, Broadway director, On the Town
- Rob Reiner, actor/writer/producer, New Girl, Flipped, The Bucket List
- Tim Robbins, actor, The Brink, Mystic River, The Shawshank Redemption
- Scott Rosenberg, producer/writer, Zoo, October Road, Con Air
- Eric Roth, writer, Extremely Loud and Incredibly Close, The Curious Case of Benjamin Button
- Pietro Scalia, editor, Black Hawk Down, Gladiator, Good Will Hunting
- Paul Schrader, writer, Raging Bull, Taxi Driver
- Tom Shadyac, filmmaker, Bruce Almighty, Evan Almighty
- Chuck Sheetz, animation director, The Simpsons, Recess
- Brad Silberling, filmmaker, Lemony Snicket's A Series of Unfortunate Events
- David Silverman, animation producer, The Simpsons
- Tom Skerritt, actor, Ted, Picket Fences, Top Gun
- Penelope Spheeris, director, Wayne's World
- Ben Stiller, actor/writer/director, The Secret Life of Walter Mitty, Zoolander
- Michael Stuhlbarg, actor, Boardwalk Empire
- Joel Surnow, writer, 24
- Jorma Taccone, writer, Saturday Night Live
- George Takei, actor, Star Trek
- Ham Tran, director, The Anniversary
- Kevin Tsai, television host/writer, Kangsi Coming
- Gore Verbinski, director, Rango, Pirates of the Caribbean
- David S. Ward, writer, Sleepless in Seattle, The Sting
- Aron Warner, producer, Shrek franchise
- Kevin Weisman, actor, Alias
- Marianne Wibberley, writer, National Treasure franchise
- Gregory Widen, writer, Highlander
- Cress Williams, actor, Prison Break
- Hoyt Yeatman, visual effects, Jack the Giant Slayer
- Chih-yen Yee, writer/director, Blue Gate Crossing
- Daphne Zuniga, actress, One Tree Hill, Melrose Place
