= In the Margins Award =

Annual literary award

The In the Margins Award, established in 2013, is an annual literary award presented to fiction and nonfiction "self published books by, for and about people of color living in the margins." The primary audience of the books is generally individuals aged 9-21 who are Black, Indigenous People of Color; "youth from a street culture," "youth in restrictive custody," and/or "youth who are reluctant readers."

The In the Margins Award was established as part of the Library Services for Youth in Custody but since 2017, has operated independently.

== Recipients ==
In the Margins Award Top 10 (2014-present)
Year	Genre	Author	Title	Ref.
2014	Fiction	Paul Langan	Survivor	
2014	Fiction	Sharon E McKay and Daniel Lafance (Illus.)	War Brothers: The Graphic Novel	
2014	Fiction	Terra Elan McVoy	Criminal	
2014	Fiction	Meg Medina	Yaqui Delgado Wants to Kick Your Ass	
2014	Fiction	Susan Nussbaum	Good Kings, Bad Kings	
2014	Fiction	Jeff Rivera	No Matter What	
2014	Fiction	Darlene Ryan	Pieces of Me	
2014	Fiction	Pamela Samuels Young	Anybody’s Daughter	
2014	Nonfiction	M. K. Asante	Buck: A Memoir	
2014	Nonfiction	Marilyn Denise Jones	From Crack to College and Vice Versa	
2015	Fiction	Lynne Ewing	The Lure	
2015	Fiction	Ashley Little	Anatomy of a Girl Gang	
2015	Fiction	Kekla Magoon	How It Went Down	
2015	Fiction	Jason Reynolds	When I Was the Greatest	
2015	Fiction	P. D. Workman	Ruby: Between the Cracks (Volume 1)	
2015	Nonfiction	Pacc Butler	From God’s Monster to the Devil’s Angel	
2015	Nonfiction	Ebony Canion	Left for Dead	
2015	Nonfiction	Michelle Miles	The High Price I Had to Pay 2: Sentenced to 30 Years as a Nonviolent, First Time Offender	
2015	Nonfiction	Rayshawn Wilson	Lionheart: Coming from Where I’m From	
2015	Nonfiction	Angela Beth Zusman	The Griots of Oakland: Voices from the African American Oral History Project	
2016	Fiction	Kevin Deutch	The Triangle: A Year on the Ground with New York’s Bloods and Crips	
2016	Fiction	E. R. Frank	Dime	
2016	Fiction	Peggy Kern	Little Peach	
2016	Fiction	Patti Laboucane-Benson	The Outside Circle	
2016	Fiction	PD Workman	Tattooed Teardrops	
2016	Nonfiction	Tewhan Butler	America’s Massacre: The Audacity of Despair and a Message of Hope	
2016	Nonfiction	Alton Carter	The Boy Who Carried Bricks: A True Story of Survival	
2016	Nonfiction	Tony Lewis, Jr.	Slugg: A Boy’s Life in the Age of Mass Incarceration	
2016	Nonfiction	Richard Ross	Girls In Justice	
2016	Nonfiction	Julian Voloj	Ghetto Brother: Warrior to Peacemaker	
2017	Fiction	Christy Lynn Abram	Little Miss Somebody	
2017	Fiction	Michael McLellan	American Flowers	
2017	Nonfiction	Alton Carter	Aging Out: A True Story	
2017	Nonfiction	Kathleen Glasgow	Girl in Pieces	
2017	Nonfiction	Ben Westhoff	Original Gangstas: The Untold Story of Dr. Dre, Eazy-E, Ice Cube, Tupac Shakur, and the Birth of West Coast Rap	
2017	Nonfiction	S. C. Sterling	Teenage Degenerate	
2017	Nonfiction	Ni-Ni Simone	Dear Yvette	
2017	Nonfiction	C. Desire	Other Broken Things	
2017	Nonfiction	Jeffry W. Johnston	The Truth	
2017	Nonfiction	Free Minds Book Club	The Untold Story of the Real Me: Young Voices from Prison	
2018	Fiction	Beacon House Writers. K. Crutcher (Ed.) with Z. Gatti (Design)	The Day Tajon Got Shot	
2018	Fiction	Peter Edwards	The Biker’s Brother	
2018	Fiction	Beth Goobie	The Pain Eater	
2018	Fiction	William Kowalski	Jumped In	
2018	Fiction	Tony Medina with John Jennings and Stacey Robinson (Illus.)	I am Alfonso Jones	
2018	Fiction	Colleen Nelson	Blood Brothers	
2018	Fiction	Christopher Paslay	White Flight	
2018	Nonfiction	Eve Porinchak	One Cut	
2018	Nonfiction	Taura Stinson and Stacey Debono (Eds.) and Glenn Adhama (Illus.)	100 Things Every Black Girl Should Know	
2018	Poetry	rm drake	Broken Flowers: And Other Stairways to Heaven	
2019	Fiction	Hobson Brandon	Where the Dead Sit Talking	
2019	Fiction	2E G	Queenpin	
2019	Fiction	Brown Kevin	Hard Knocks High: Darkskins and Redbones	
2019	Fiction	Colfer Eoin, Andrew Donkin, and Giovanni Rigano (Illus.)	Illegal	
2019	Nonfiction	Goozh Judi and Sue Jeweler	Tell Me About When Moms and Dads Go to Jail: Tell Me About Jail	
2019	Nonfiction	Goozh Judi and Sue Jeweler	Tell Me About When Moms and Dads Come Home From Jail: Tell Me About Jail	
2019	Nonfiction	Griffin-Wallace Valencia	Motherless Child: A Journey of Growing Up and Forgiving	
2019	Nonfiction	Hawkins Lamont U-God	Raw: My Journey Into the Wu-Tang	
2019	Nonfiction	Hobson Brandon	Where the Dead Sit Talking	
2019	Nonfiction	Jarrett Krosoczka	Hey, Kiddo	
2019	Nonfiction	Latin American Youth Center Writers and Santiago Casares	Voces sin Fronteras: Our Stories, Our Truth	
2019	Nonfiction	Ramos Nonieqa	The Disturbed Girl’s Dictionary	
2020	Fiction	Tasha Spillett-Sumner and Natasha Donavan	Surviving the City	
2020	Fiction	Sonia Patel	Bloody Seoul	
2020	Fiction	René Colato Laínez and Fabricio Vanden Broeck	My Shoes and I: Crossing Three Borders / Mis Zapatos y Yo: Cruzando tres Fronteras	
2020	Fiction	Annette D. Taylor	Dreams on Fire	
2020	Fiction	Erika T. Wurth	You Who Enter Here	
2020	Nonfiction	Tytianna N. M. Wells and Ashley Cathey	When Hip Hop Met Poetry: An Urban Love Story	
2020	Nonfiction	Johnathan Harris and Gary Leach	Colorblind: A Story on Racism	
2020	Nonfiction	Jean Mendoza, Debbie Reese, and Roxanne Dunbar-Ortiz	An Indigenous Peoples’ History of the United States for Young People (ReVisioning American History for Young People)	
2020	Nonfiction	Rex Ogle	Free Lunch	
2020	Nonfiction	Damon Young	What Doesn’t Kill You Makes You Stronger	
2021	Fiction	Normandy D. Piccolo	Why is Kristyn a Kutter?	
2021	Fiction	James Price	The Comeback: I Raised These Streets	
2021	Fiction	David A. Robertson, Scott B. Henderson, and Donavan Yaciuk	The Reckoner Rise: Breakdown	
2021	Fiction	Michael W. Waters and Keisha Morris	For Beautiful Black Boys Who Believe in a Better World	
2021	Nonfiction	Mark Bleschke	Into the Streets: A Young Person’s Visual History of Protest in the United States	
2021	Nonfiction	Heather Gale and Mika Song	Ho'onani: Hula Warrior	
2021	Nonfiction	Patrisse Khan-Cullors and Asha Bendele	When They Call You a Terrorist: A Story of Black Lives Matter and the Power to Change the World	
2021	Nonfiction	Passage Academy Students at Belmont	Everything I Been Through	
2022	Fiction	Matt de la Peña and Christian Robinson	Milo Imagines the World	
2022	Fiction	Sharon G. Flake	The Life I’m In	
2022	Fiction	Free Minds Writers	They Called Me 299-359: Poetry by the Incarcerated Youth of Free Minds	
2022	Fiction	Emolie Kpadea, Japan Spells, Damarco Taylor, and Rob Gibson	And Justice for Who?	
2022	Nonfiction	John Lewis, Andrew Aydin, L. Fury, and Nate Powell	Run: Book One	
2022	Nonfiction	Chella Man and Ashley Lukashevsky	Continuum (A Pocket Change Collective)	
2022	Nonfiction	Marcia Argueta Mickelson	Where I Belong	
2022	Nonfiction	Victorya Rouse	Finding Refuge: Real Life Immigration Stories From Young People	
2022	Nonfiction	Elisabet Velasquez	When We Make It	
2022	Nonfiction	Frank Abe, Tamiko Nimura, Ross Ishikawa, and Matt Sasaki	We Hereby Refuse: Japanese American Resistance at Wartime Incarceration	
2023	Fiction	Jason Reynolds, Jason Griffin	Ain’t Burned all the Bright	
2023	Fiction	Charles A. Bush	Every Variable of Us	
2023	Fiction	Sergio Troncoso	Nobody’s Pilgrims	
2023	Fiction	Juliana Goodman	The Black Girl Left Standing.	
2023	Fiction	Natalie Blank	The Tangibles	
2023	Non-fiction	Jetta Grace Martin, Joshua Bloom, and Waldo E. Martin, Jr.	Freedom! The Story of the Black Panther Party	
2023	Non-fiction	Kirstin Cronn-Mills	Gender Inequality in Sports from Title IX to World Titles	
2023	Non-fiction	Larry Miller, Lacia Lucy	Jump: My Secret Journey From the Streets to the Boardroom	
2023	Non-fiction	David Grann	Killers of the Flower Moon: Adapted for Young Readers: The Osage Murders and the Birth of the FBI.	
2023	Non-fiction	Free Minds Book Club and Writing Workshop	When You Hear Me, You Hear Us: Voices of Youth Incarcerated	
2024	Fiction	Wanda John-Kehewin, Nicole Burton, and Kielamel Sibal	Dreams: Visions of the Crow, Volume 1	
2024	Fiction	Kelly J. Baptist	Eb and Flow	
2024	Fiction	Kim Johnson	Invisible Son	
2024	Fiction	Katy Grant	Three Shots	
2024	Non-fiction	Akim Aliu, Greg Anderson Elysée, Karen de la Vega and Marcus Williams	Akim Aliu: Dreamer	
2024	Non-fiction	Alex Wheattle	Sufferah: The Memoir of a Brixton Raggae-Head	
2024	Non-fiction	Ice-T, Spike, and Douglas Century	Split Decision: Life Stories	
2024	Social Justice Advocacy	James Hannaham	Didn’t Nobody Give a Shit What Happened to Carlotta	
2024	Social Justice Advocacy	Junauda Petrus and Kristen Uroda	Can We Please Give the Police Department to the Grandmothers?	
2024	Social Justice Advocacy	Kevin H. Abdur-Rahman.	The Eruption of Possible: To Burst From the Limits of Environment	
2025	Fiction	Curtis “50 Cent” Jackson with Aaron Philip Clark	The Accomplice: A Novel	
2025	Fiction	Desmond Hall	Better Must Come	
2025	Fiction	David F. Walker	The Second Chance of Darius Logan	
2025	Fiction	Hannah K.	Marty’s Kid	
2025	Non-fiction	Jay Patton, Antoine Patton, Kiara Valdez, and Markia Jenai	Dear Dad: Growing Up with a Parent in Prison — and How We Stayed Connected	
2025	Non-fiction	Lawrence Ralph	Sito: An American Teenager and the City that Failed Him	
2025	Non-fiction	Normandy D. Piccolo	One Pill Killed: Fentanyl Poisoning. Are you Next?	
2025	Non-fiction	M. K. Asante	Nephew: a Memoir in 4-Part Harmony	
2025	Non-fiction	Dorsey Nunn with Lee Romney	What Kind of Bird Can’t Fly: A Memoir of Resilience ans Resurrection	
2025	Social Justice Advocacy	Sonya Ballantyne, Rhael McGregor and Toben Racicot	Little by Little You Can Change the World	
2026	Fiction	Normandy D. Piccolo	Bug	
2026	Fiction	Jason Reynolds	Coach	
2026	Fiction	Helena Haywoode Henry	Last Chance Live!	
2026	Fiction	Channelle Desamours	Needy Little Things	
2026	Fiction	Kim Johnson	The Color of a Lie	
2026	Fiction	Frederick Joseph	This Thing of Ours	
2026	Non-fiction	Emma Bland-Smith	Growing Up in the Shadow of Alcatraz	
2026	Non-fiction	Roxanne Dunbar-Ortiz, adapted by Paul Peart-Smith	Indigenous Peoples’ History of the United States	
2026	Non-fiction	Candace Fleming	Death in the Jungle: Murder, Betrayal, and the Lost Dream of Jonestown	
2026	Non-fiction	Raymond Santana	Pushing Hope: an Illustrated Memoir of Survival	
