= Alternative hip-hop =

Sub-genre of hip-hop

- Other names: Alternative rap; backpack rap
- Stylistic origins: Hip-hop; funk; jazz; soul; reggae; conscious rap; progressive rap
- Cultural origins: Mid-to-late 1980s, United States
- Typical instruments: Vocals; turntables; drum machine; drums; keyboard; sampler; bass guitar; guitar; synthesizer

Subgenres
- Jazz rap; boom bap; psychedelic rap; nerdcore; rap rock; industrial hip-hop; turntablism; lo-fi hip-hop; hipster hop; trip-hop; glitch hop; punk rap; rapcore

Other topics
- Instrumental hip-hop; political hip-hop; native tongues; underground hip-hop; chopped and screwed; internet rap; jerk rap; Memphis rap; lowend; hyphy; trap metal; plunderphonics

Alternative hip-hop (also known as alternative rap) is a subgenre of hip-hop defined by artists who reject the genre's traditional stereotypes, particularly those popularized by old-school hip-hop and gangsta rap. They blur genres together and are heavily inspired by funk, pop/rock, soul, jazz, folk and reggae. Originally emerging in the 1980s, the style was spearheaded by the Native Tongues collective in the East Coast which included acts like the Jungle Brothers, De La Soul, A Tribe Called Quest, and Queen Latifah. These artists used Afrocentric themes, use of eclectic sampling and jazz-influenced beats.

During the 1990s, the alternative hip-hop movement expanded with West Coast artists such as the Pharcyde, Digital Underground, Souls of Mischief, and Outkast. The commercial and cultural momentum of the movement was impeded by the rise and popularity of West Coast gangsta rap, though experienced a degree of mainstream recognition through the success of the Fugees, De La Soul, A Tribe Called Quest, Outkast and Arrested Development. The Native Tongues movement inspired later alt-rap acts such as the Roots, Black Eyed Peas, Pharrell Williams, Kanye West and Pusha T.

By the 2000s to 2010s, alternative hip-hop reattained its place within the mainstream through the "backpack rap" movement, which included the crossover success of artists such as Kanye West. Others included Hieroglyphics, Atmosphere, Aceyalone, Dilated Peoples and the Alchemist. Collectives such as Odd Future and Brockhampton emerged out of the movement, while alternative hip-hop evolved to encompass several trap-based Internet rap genres.

== Characteristics ==
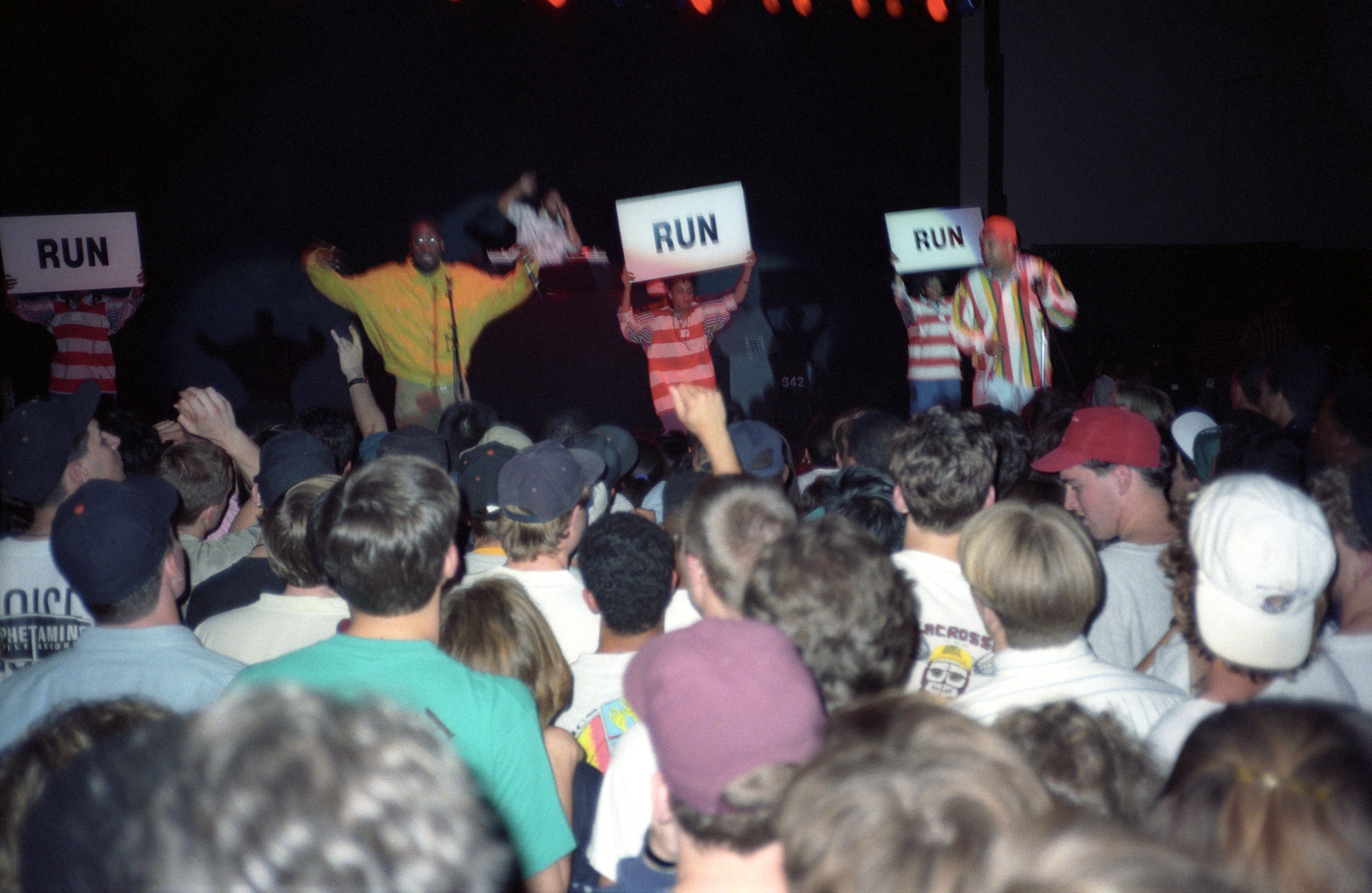
De La Soul performing at the Dillon Gymnasium in 1991

During the commercial rise of hip hop in the 1980s and early 1990s, the popularity of hardcore hip-hop and gangsta rap led to themes of gangsterism, consumerism, and club culture becoming defining stereotypes of mainstream hip hop, with more negative stereotypes being related to homophobia, violence and sexism. Alternative hip-hop emerged largely to subvert, satirize or challenge these conventions, utilizing unconventional musical techniques, production, and sampling not commonly found in mainstream hip-hop at the time, while aligning itself with underground youth subcultures such as skaters, nerds, punks, and goths.

Artists often incorporated socially conscious, intellectual, or introspective lyricism, avoided profanity, while dismantling rap stereotypes on topics such as sexuality through androgynous fashion and styles, though early artists associated with the movement such as A Tribe Called Quest would also perpetuate some of these traditional stereotypes, with their song "Georgie Porgie", being rejected for being "too homophobic".

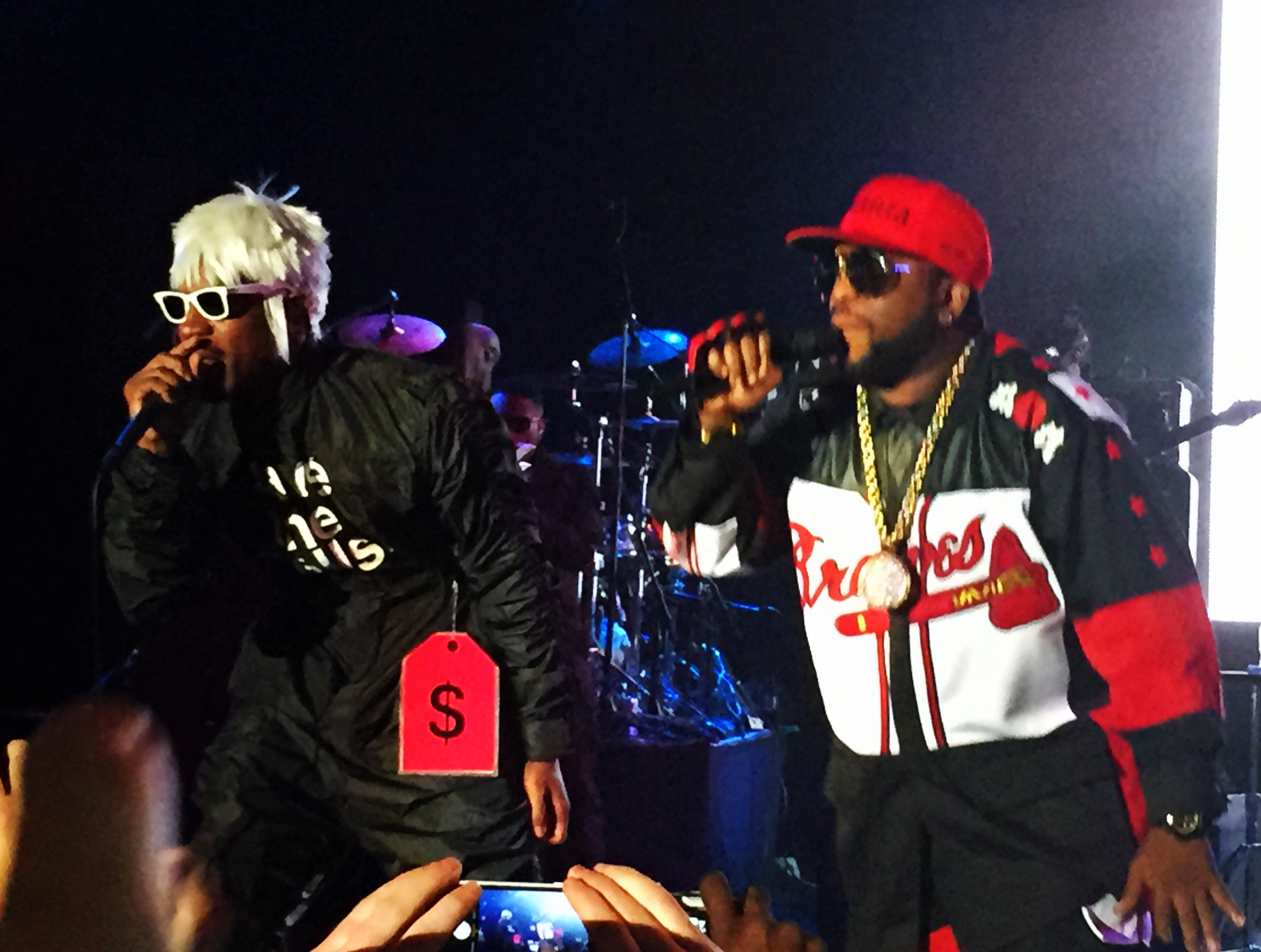
Outkast performing in New York, 2014

While some groups achieved commercial success, most alternative rap acts tended to be embraced largely by alternative rock listeners and indie music fans rather than hip-hop or pop audiences. In his 1995 book on the state of hip-hop culture, music critic Stephen Rodrick wrote that, at that time, alternative hip-hop had "drawn little more than barely concealed yawns from other rappers and urban audiences" and concluded that the subgenre was a failure in dismantling the mainstream consensus on hip-hop.

By the 2000s to 2010s, the stereotypes popularized by West Coast gangsta rap in the 1990s had become dominant in mainstream hip hop, prompting discussions about the genre's portrayal of violence, drugs and sexism as well as the commercial prioritization of these themes, which some critics argued perpetuated negative representations of African-American culture. However, artists emerging through the internet rap movement continued to carry the legacy of alternative hip-hop, through experimental production techniques and satirical lyrics.

== History ==
=== 1980s–1990s: Origins ===
Although hip-hop originally emerged from New York's underground music scene during the early 1970s, by the end of the decade, the genre began to gain wider mainstream attention through the prominence of disco-rap, which prompted artists to explore more experimental approaches to their work. In 1983, Rammellzee and K-Rob released the single "Beat Bop", which was produced and arranged by Jean-Michel Basquiat. Though it remained largely underground, the track was later described as a blueprint for the "apocalyptic, witty, and experimental" style of later alternative hip-hop artists.

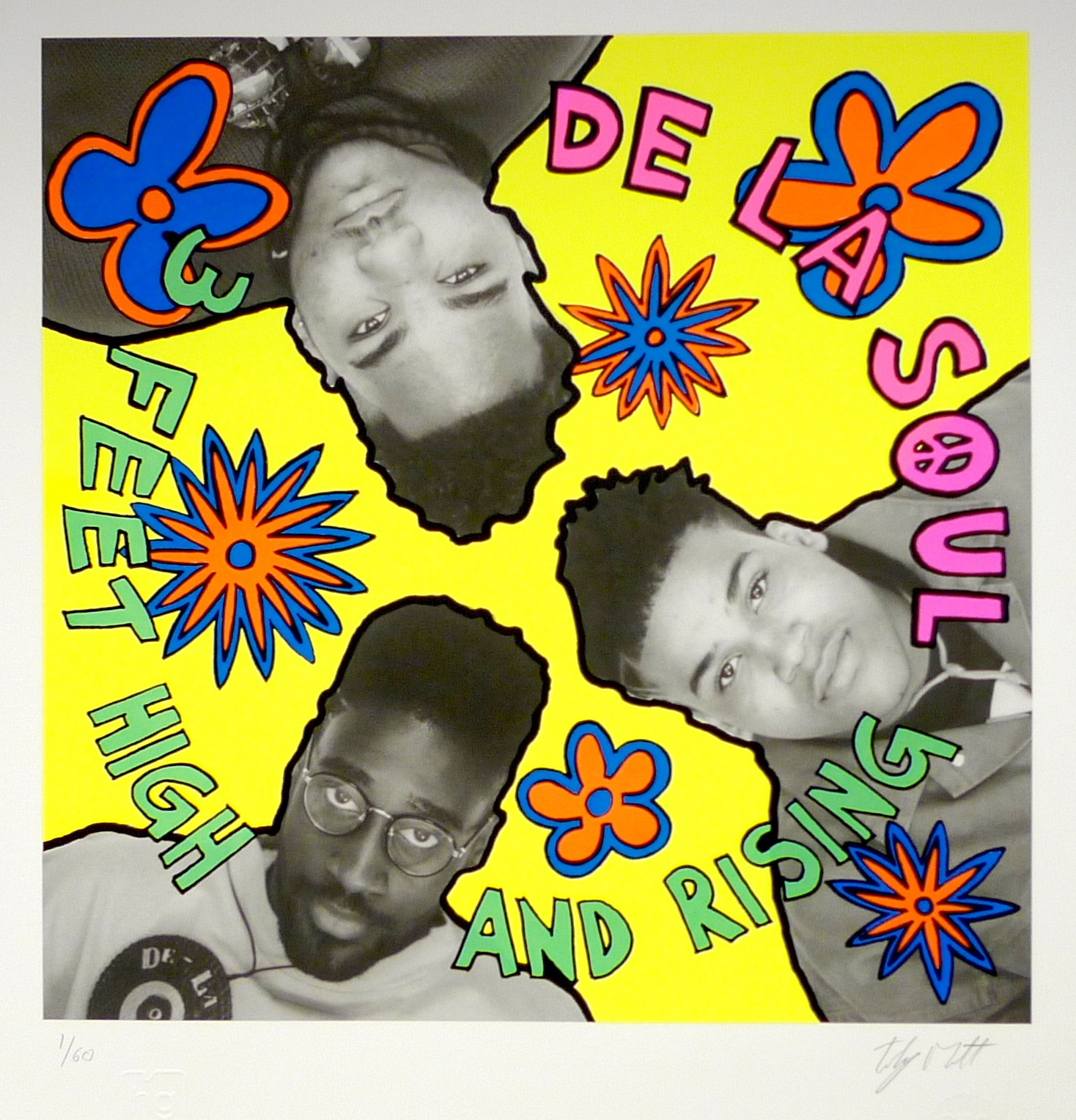
Cover print of De La Soul's 1989 album 3 Feet High and Rising

By the late 1980s, in midst of the golden age of hip-hop, alternative hip-hop was headed primarily by the Native Tongues movement in the East Coast, artists such as Jungle Brothers, De La Soul, A Tribe Called Quest, Monie Love, X Clan, Queen Latifah while later including Busta Rhymes and Mos Def. Drawing influences from conscious and progressive rap artists like Grandmaster Flash, Pete Rock & CL Smooth and Brand Nubian as well as from the radical and militant political hip-hop group Public Enemy. While the West Coast helmed left-field hip-hop acts such as the Pharcyde, Digital Underground, Souls of Mischief, Del the Funky Homosapien, Jurassic 5, Styles of Beyond and Freestyle Fellowship as well as certain Southern acts such as Arrested Development, Goodie Mob, and Outkast. Similar to the alternative rock movement, alternative hip-hop segued into the mainstream at the dawn of the 1990s.

In 1991, P.M. Dawn released the alternative rap song "Set Adrift On Memory Bliss", which became the first #1 single from a Black rap group since the beginning of the Neilsen Soundscan era. The duo was widely recorded as an alternative hip-hop group for its merging of ethereal lyrics and soundscapes, not typical or mainstream hip-hop at the time.

Arrested Development and the Fugees achieved mainstream success in the 1990s. The classic debut albums 3 Feet High and Rising (1989), People's Instinctive Travels and the Paths of Rhythm (1990), and Bizarre Ride II the Pharcyde (1992) achieved minor commercial success as they garnered immense acclaim from music critics, who described the records as ambitiously innovative but playful masterpieces, hailing the artists as the future of hip-hop music as a whole. However, the alternative rap movement was soon overshadowed by the sudden rise of gangsta rap in the early 1990s, as artists like De La Soul were beginning to garner attention, music critic Chris Nickson recounts "De La Soul went from the front of the hip-hop pack to the back of an appealing and colorful dead-end street". The Native Tongues movement inspired later alt rap artists such as the Roots, Lupe Fiasco, Digable Planets, Common, Black Star, J Dilla, Lauryn Hill, MF Doom and Pharrell Williams.

=== Late 1990s–2000s ===
Contrary to alternative rock, which went on to become a mainstay in mainstream music and replaced the glam metal of the previous generation as the most popular form of rock music. Alternative hip-hop's commercial momentum was impeded by the then also newly emerging, significantly harder-edged West Coast gangsta rap. With its aggressive tone, nihilistic tendencies, and violent imagery, gangsta rap was considered to be the more entertaining, more lucrative subgenre as signified by the high chart placings, radio success and multiplatinum-selling records of gangsta rappers such as Snoop Dogg, Warren G and N.W.A, who were widely embraced by major record labels and produced a legion of imitators. Albums such as Straight Outta Compton (1989), The Chronic (1992) and Doggystyle (1993) redefined the direction of hip-hop, which resulted in lyricism concerning the gangsta lifestyle becoming the driving force of sales figures. The situation changed around the mid-'90s with the emergence and mainstream popularity of East Coast hardcore rap artists such as Wu-Tang Clan, Nas, the Notorious B.I.G., and Mobb Deep. Following this development, many alternative rap acts eventually either disbanded or faded into obscurity.

A commercial breakthrough came about in the late 1990s with the rejuvenated interest in indie music by the general public due to the mainstream success of acts like the Fugees and Arrested Development, while acts such as Slum Village, Common, and the Roots were rising to prominence.

The Fugees saw huge critical and commercial success with the release of their second album, The Score, in 1996. The album peaked at number one on the US Billboard 200 chart, and briefly became the best-selling hip-hop album of all time. That same year, A Tribe Called Quest reached their commercial peak with the release of their album Beats, Rhymes and Life, which reached number one on the US Billboard 200 and became their best-selling release, while acts such as Outkast and De La Soul released some of their most definitive albums with Atliens and Stakes Is High.

Since the mid-1990s, independent record labels such as Rawkus Records, Rhymesayers Entertainment, Anticon, Stones Throw, Definitive Jux and QN5 have experienced lesser mainstream success with alternative rap acts such as CunninLynguists, Jurassic 5, Little Brother, Talib Kweli, MF Doom, Atmosphere, Antipop Consortium, Mos Def, Doomtree, Pharoahe Monch, El-P, Quasimoto, Living Legends, Cyne, Blue Scholars, and Aesop Rock. In the 2000s, alternative hip-hop reattained its place within the mainstream, due in part to the declining commercial viability of gangsta rap as well as the crossover success of artists such as Outkast, Kanye West, and Gnarls Barkley.

Outkast's fifth studio album, Speakerboxxx/The Love Below (2003) received universal acclaim from music critics and had two number-one hit singles. The album won a Grammy Award for Album of the Year—making it only the second hip-hop album to win the award (The Miseducation of Lauryn Hill being the first) and has been certified diamond by selling 11 times platinum by the Recording Industry Association of America (RIAA).

MF Doom grew in popularity in the underground scene after releasing his debut studio album, Operation: Doomsday (1999). He came back to the hip-hop scene after the dissolving of group KMD. Later, he and Madlib's 2004 project Madvillainy was released in this time period as the duo Madvillain. This album was praised by music critics and inspired other artists, such as Aminé and Joey Badass.

Gnarls Barkley experienced a surprise hit with their debut single, "Crazy". Due to high download sales, it reached number one in the single charts in several countries, including the United Kingdom, where it became the best-selling single of 2006. The song was named the best song of 2006 by both Rolling Stone and the Village Voice's annual Pazz & Jop critics poll. Rolling Stone later ranked "Crazy" as the number-one song of the decade. The song has been certified eight times platinum by RIAA.The duo were the recipient of multiple accolades; at the 49th Grammy Awards, they won the awards for Best Urban/Alternative Performance and Best Alternative Music Album.

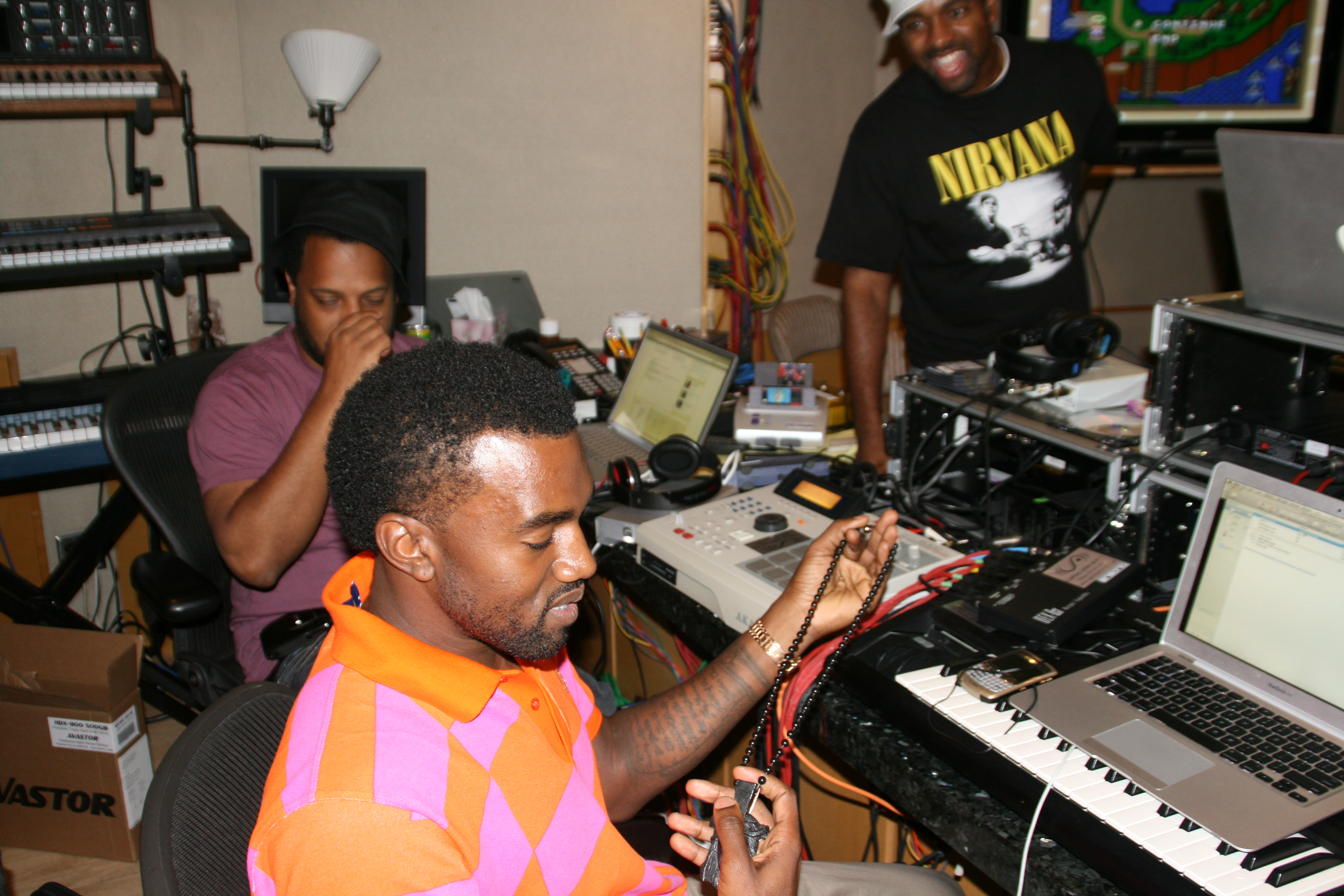
West (center) working on 808s & Heartbreak with producer and former mentor No I.D. (left) in October 2008

Industry observers view the 2007 sales competition between Kanye West's Graduation and 50 Cent's Curtis as a turning point for hip-hop. Ben Detrick of XXL credited the outcome of the sales competition with altering the direction of hip-hop and paving the way for new rappers who did not follow the hardcore-gangster mold, writing, "If there was ever a watershed moment to indicate hip-hop's changing direction, it may have come when 50 Cent competed with Kanye in 2007 to see whose album would claim superior sales. Kanye sold 957,000 units and 50 Cent sold 691,000 units. Kanye led a wave of new artists described as "backpack rap" these included acts such as Kid Cudi, Wale, Lupe Fiasco, Kidz in the Hall, Drake, Nicki Minaj, who lacked the interest or ability to create narratives about any past gunplay or drug-dealing." Similarly, in a retrospective article, Rosie Swash of The Guardian viewed the album's sales competition with 50 Cent's Curtis as a historical moment in hip-hop, writing that it "highlighted the diverging facets of hip-hop in the last decade; the former was gangsta rap for the noughties, while West was the thinking man's alternative."

=== 2010s–2020s ===
Several artists and groups acknowledge being directly influenced by their 1990s predecessors in addition to alternative rock groups while their music has been noted by critics as expressing eclectic sounds, life experiences and emotions rarely seen in mainstream hip-hop. As traditional rock music continually becomes less synonymous with pop music, more left-of-center artists who are not fully embraced by hip-hop radio have increasingly found inclusion on alternative radio. According to Nielsen SoundScan, contemporary hip-hop acts who increasingly receive domestic airplay on alt-radio include Run the Jewels, Childish Gambino, Logic, Brockhampton, L.I.F.T. and nothing,nowhere. Regarding audiences, according to Jeff Regan, senior director of music programming for the Alt Nation channel on Sirius XM Radio, "This generation has maybe never even gone to a record store or CD store where there was a hip-hop section and a rock section—it has all been in front of them on a screen." Thus recording artists and groups traditionally perceived as rappers are included on his predominantly rock-oriented playlists. He said, "Whether it's Lil Peep or Brockhampton or Post Malone, we have tried records from all those artists. ... We need some depth perception in the music we're presenting. Whether it's done on a laptop or on an amp and a guitar, I just want to find something new—that's what alternative is supposed to be."

== Reception and legacy ==
Alternative hip-hop is the recipient of consistent critical acclaim but is generally shunned by American mainstream media and widely regarded as commercially unappealing. New York radio personality and spoken word artist Imhotep Gary Byrd's single "The Crown" was rejected by American radio stations for being "too Black and too positive." However, the song was very well received and became a hit in Europe. It reached number 6 on the UK Singles Chart, becoming the longest record ever to reach the top 10 in the history of the British Charts. Over the years, multiple organizations representing African Americans such as the National Black Leadership Alliance and the National Congress of Black Women have released statements criticizing how urban radio stations refuse to play rap music that does not demean and degrade black women, shunning alternative hip-hop artists such as Arrested Development and Dead Prez. Q-Tip, frontman of the highly influential alternative rap group A Tribe Called Quest, had his sophomore solo effort, Kamaal the Abstract, shelved for nearly a decade after his record label deemed the genre-bending album as sounding uncommercial. Q-Tip said:

I am really disappointed that Kamaal wasn't released. LA Reid didn't know what to do with it; then, three years later, they release Outkast. What Outkast is doing now, those are the kinds of sounds that are on Kamaal the Abstract. Maybe even a little more out. Kamaal was just me, guerrilla.

Similarly, BET refused to play "Lovin' It", the lead single of duo Little Brother's socio-politically charged concept album The Minstrel Show (2005), which provided a tongue-in-cheek critique of African-American pop culture, on the grounds that the group's music was "too intelligent" for their target audience. The network was subsequently satirized by the animated series The Boondocks – which regularly features underground/alternative rap as background music – in the banned episode "The Hunger Strike". The episode, which portrayed BET as an evil organization dedicated to the self-genocidal mission of eradicating black people through violent, overtly sexual programming, was banned by Cartoon Network and was not aired in the United States until 2020.

The alternative hip-hop movement is not limited solely to the United States, as genre-defying rappers such as Somali-Canadian poet K'naan and British artist M.I.A. have achieved worldwide recognition. K'naan's 2009 single "Wavin' Flag" reached number two on the Canadian Hot 100 while its various remixes topped the charts in several countries. Shing02 was chosen for rapping "Battlecry", the theme song of the hit hip-hop-influenced chanbara anime Samurai Champloo, which had music produced by Japanese jazz rap DJ Nujabes. Time magazine placed M.I.A in the Time 100 list of "World's Most Influential people" for having "global influence across many genres." Groups like the British virtual band Gorillaz also experienced mainstream popularity during this time, selling over 20 million albums total between the albums Gorillaz (2001) and Demon Days (2005). Today, due in part to the increasing use of social networking as well as online distribution, many alternative rap artists are finding acceptance by far-reaching audiences.

== Related genres ==
=== Experimental hip-hop ===
Experimental hip-hop is a subgenre of hip-hop music characterized by its use of unconventional sounds, structures, and production techniques. Originally emerging in the 1980s to early 1990s, it blends elements from avant-garde, electronic, noise, industrial music and other non-traditional styles with rap, often emphasizing innovation and abstraction through unconventional rhythms, production, samples, audio manipulation and lyricism. The term is generally applied to works that challenge the stylistic boundaries of hip-hop, and usually deemed widely uncommercial, challenging, difficult, inaccessible or underground.

=== Backpack rap ===
Backpack rap is a style of hip-hop that initially emerged as a "derogatory phrase", though was later embraced by artists and fans with the popularity and success of Lupe Fiasco and Kanye West. West was known for sporting an "oversize rucksack onstage and in interviews". The style was criticized for being "corny, nerdy" and having "no hood credibility." The label has been used synonymously with "underground, indie, conscious or alternative hip-hop," and was embraced by fans who disliked "the violence and materialism of gangsta rap", as well as "filling the void" left by the decline of hyphy.

According to SFGate, the Alchemist labelled backpack rap as representing "a return to the core values of Golden Age hip-hop: lyrical skills and original music". While further stating, "Aceyalone noted that West Coast hip-hop artists have always been lyrical, despite the perception of the region as a hotbed of gangsta rap". Artists described as backpack rap include Hieroglyphics, Atmosphere, Aceyalone, Dilated Peoples and the Alchemist.

== See also ==
- List of alternative hip-hop artists
- Old-school hip-hop
- New-school hip-hop

== Bibliography ==
- Asante Jr., M. K. (September 16, 2008). It's Bigger Than Hip Hop: The Rise of the Post-Hip-Hop Generation. St. Martin's Press. ISBN 978-0312373269.
- Nickson, Chris (2004). Hey Ya!: The Unauthorized Biography of Outkast. Macmillan. ISBN 0312337353.
- Rodrick, Stephen (March 1, 1995). "Hip-Hop Flop: The Failure of Liberal Rap". In Adam Sexton (ed.). Rap on Rap: Straight-up Talk on Hip-Hop Culture. Delta. ISBN 0385312474.
