= Zora Neale Hurston House =

Historic house in Florida, United States

- U.S. National Register of Historic Places
- U.S. National Historic Landmark
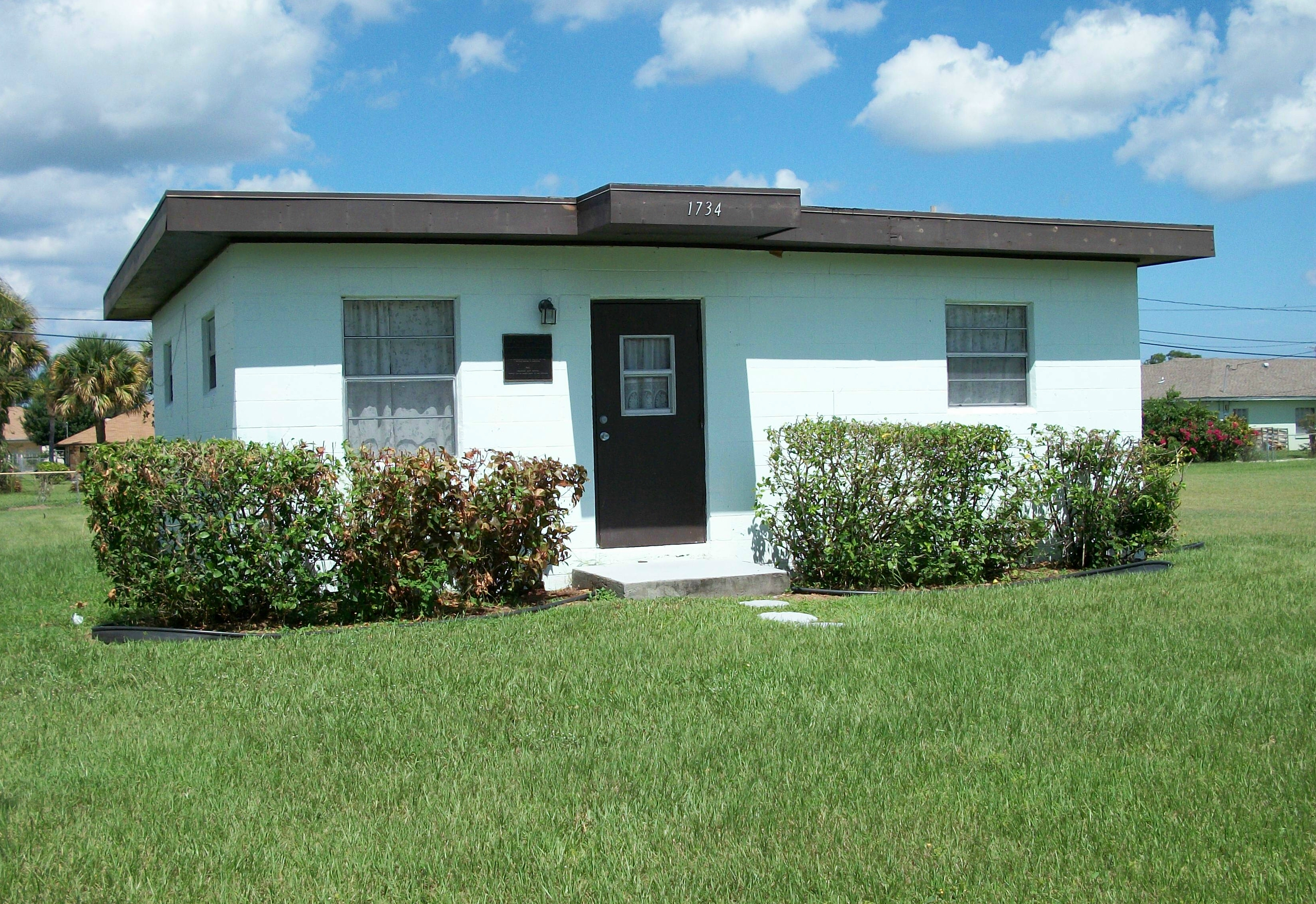

- Location within Florida Location within the United States
- Location: 1734 Avenue L, Fort Pierce, Florida
- Coordinates: 27°27′39″N 80°20′31″W
- Area: Less than one acre
- Built: 1957
- Built by: Benton, C.C.
- Architectural style: Frame Vernacular
- NRHP reference No.: 91002047

Significant dates
- Added to NRHP: December 4, 1991
- Designated NHL: December 4, 1991

The Zora Neale Hurston House is a historic house at 1734 Avenue L in Fort Pierce, Florida. Built in 1957, it was the home of author Zora Neale Hurston from then until her death in 1960. On December 4, 1991, it was designated as a U.S. National Historic Landmark.

== Description and history ==
The Zora Neale Hurston House stands in a residential area of Fort Pierce, on the north side of Avenue L, between North 17th and North 19th Streets. It is a modest single-story house, built out of concrete blocks with a stuccoed exterior and a flat tar-and-gravel roof. The house is not architecturally distinguished; it was one of a number of identical homes built in 1957 built by Dr. C.C. Benton, a medical doctor, who had sold 10 nearby acres for construction of "a new negro high school" nearby. Originally located on School Court, it was moved, retaining orientation, north 500 feet in 1995 to 1734 Avenue L to allow for expansion of Lincoln Park Academy, the school at which Hurston taught.

Hurston, a native of Notasulga, Alabama, but who lived and wrote about Eatonville, Florida, was one of the leading female African-American writers of the mid-20th century. She lived rent-free (courtesy of Dr. Benton) in this house from 1957 until her death. While there, she worked as a journalist for the Fort Pierce Chronicle, taught at the academy, and continued to work on her manuscript for The Life of Herod the Great, which remained unpublished at the time of her death. This house is the only known home of hers to survive.

The house is a stop on the Zora Neale Hurston Dust Tracks Heritage Trail. Other stops on the trail include the Zora Neale Hurston Branch Library, a "Zora Exhibit" at the Agape Senior Recreation Center (formerly the St. Lucie County Welfare Home, where Hurston died in 1960), and the Garden of Heavenly Rest Cemetery, where she is buried.

== See also ==
- List of National Historic Landmarks in Florida
- National Register of Historic Places listings in St. Lucie County, Florida
- List of residences of American writers
