= Mrs. Brown (disambiguation) =

Mrs Brown is a 1997 British drama film.

Mrs. Brown may also refer to:

- Mrs. Brown's Boys, an Irish/British TV sitcom
- Agnes Browne, a 1999 American/Irish romantic comedy film
- Anna Gordon (ballad collector), Scottish ballad collector (1747–1810)
- "Mrs. Leroy Brown", song from Van Lear Rose
- Mr. Bennett and Mrs. Brown, an essay by Virginia Woolf.

== See also ==
- Mister Brown (disambiguation)
- "Mrs. Brown, You've Got a Lovely Daughter"
- Ms. Brown, a mascot from M&M's
