= The Miquon School =

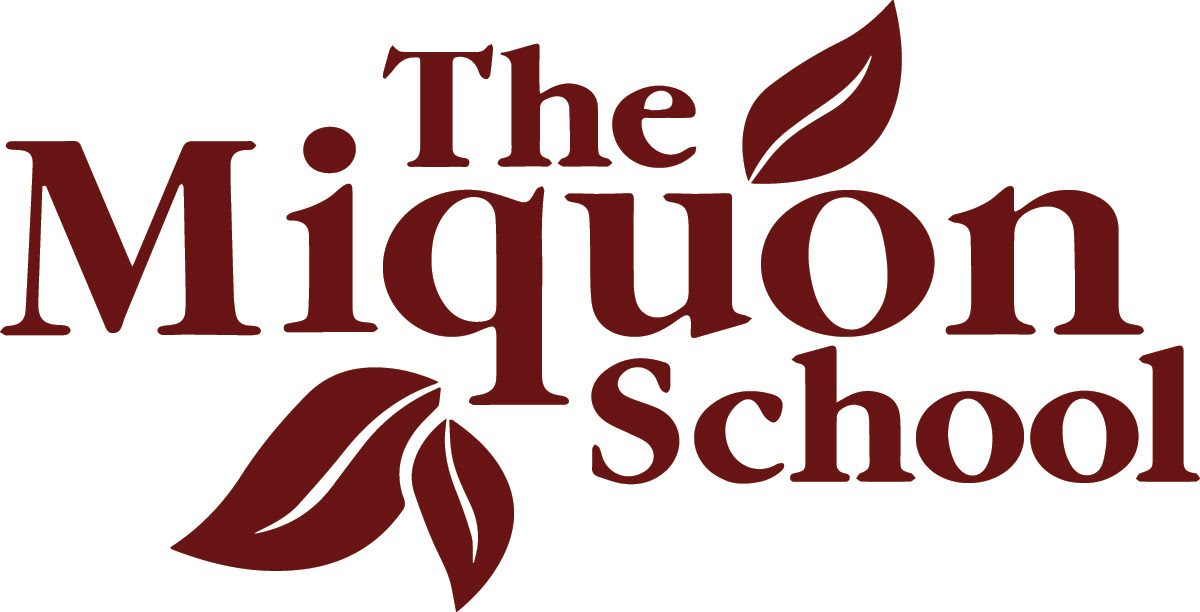
- The Miquon School logo

Location
- 2025 Harts Lane; Conshohocken, Pennsylvania 19428; USA; 40.06743°N 75.26898°W

Information
- Type: Private
- Motto: Providing a Progressive education program for children ages 3-12.
- Established: 1932
- Principal: Geetha Holdsworth
- Grades: N–6
- Gender: Coeducational
- Enrollment: 154
- Campus size: Ten acres
- Campus type: Rural
- Colors: Maroon and white
- Newspaper: The Miquon Celery Stick
- Website: www.miquon.org

The Miquon School is an independent, parent-owned, elementary school located in Conshohocken, Pennsylvania.

One of the newer buildings as it appeared in the early evening during one 3rd-4th grade's after school campfire and dusk study.

== History ==
The Miquon School was founded in 1932 by Margaret Kiscadden and Peggy Irwin as a cooperative run by parents, as a "progressive, independent elementary school in a red, two-room farmhouse in Whitemarsh Township". Parents were responsible for "policy, operation and maintenance".

== Description ==
The school follows the educational philosophy of John Dewey, who "developed curricula and methodologies that focused on activities and projects, discovery, investigation, and real-world experiences". A co-founder said, "We read extensively the works of Gesell, Kilpatrick and Dewey on education and finally mustered up the courage to start an experimental cooperative school here in Miquon."

By 1947, the school had become "known among educators as an outstanding exponent of the 'progressive' theory of education", and had over 100 students, ages 3 to 12.

A 1967 Philadelphia Inquirer article reported, "In 1954 a concerted effort was made to improve teaching at Miquon and the freedom of aca demic policies has allowed the programs to move forward dramatically. The total enrollment is 155. Miquon's math program, for instance, is distributed by the Encyclopædia Britannica. Surprisingly, in spite of the economic pressures of low salaries, the teaching staff turnover is low... It is a topnotch progressive private school where the student-teacher ratio is high and a youngster's individual development is primary. Miquon has some pretty advanced education methods."

In 1976, a profile of principal Richard Mandel said,

Miquon is one of those unstructured co-ops started by parents who were dissatisfied with what the public schools had to offer, and it is still owned and run by its parents. Such alternative schools have become something of a national fad in the past few years; the average life span of such a school is 18 months, according to the New Schools Exchange, a California group that publishes a directory of alternative schools... But Miquon has been around for 44 years. Its parents and its 140 students and 18 teachers survive on a bare-bones, $250,000 budget by creating their own teaching materials and by using the natural resources of their 13 rustic acres as much as possible.

The Upper School was founded in 1970 and later became The Crefeld School.

== See also ==
- The Crefeld School
