= Buck: Original Book Soundtrack =

Soundtrack album by M. K. Asante and Various artists
- Released: May 13, 2015
- Recorded: 2014
- Length: 39:10
- Labels: Wonderful Sound Studios; Javotti Media

Singles from Buck: Original Book Soundtrack
- 1. "Godz N The Hood"; 2. "Young Bucks"

Buck: Original Book Soundtrack is the soundtrack album to the book Buck: A Memoir by M. K. Asante. The soundtrack, presented by Javotti Media and produced by Wonderful Sound Studios, was released digitally for online download (free) on May 13, 2015, one year to date after the release of the paper book release of Buck: A Memoir.

"Buck, the memoir is important not just for its scope and passion," Talib Kweli, founder of Javotti Media, told AllHipHop.com, "but for the author’s refusal to apologize for existing. The accompanying soundtrack allows you to engulf yourself in this world. When you do, you realize that this work of art is not just important, but necessary.”

The soundtrack is M. K. Asante's debut music project. The first single from the project, "Godz N the Hood", a collaboration with Ras Kass, Talib Kweli and Bishop Lamont was also featured on Ras Kass's album Barmageddon.

The first video released was "Young Bucks" featuring King Mez and premiered on Revolt (TV network). The video was filmed during the Baltimore Riots and features striking footage of the artists performing amid the uprising.

== Critical reception ==
Okayplayer wrote:

"Delivering realism as vivid as Nas‘ work on the seminal Illmatic LP, MK Asante has managed to churn out one of the most moving and visually brilliant rap projects to land in quite some time."

== Track listing ==
No.	Title	Writer(s)	Producer(s)	Length
1.	"Intro"	M. K. Asante	Stevie Wonder	0:53
2.	"Young Bucks" (featuring King Mez)		Commissioner Gordon & J-Macc	3:43
3.	"The Bulletin" (featuring Uzi)		Faze Miyake	4:02
4.	"Hungry & Foolish"		Lee Steffen	5:08
5.	"Blank Page"		Madlib	1:14
6.	"Buck Shots" (featuring Uzi)		King Mez	3:48
7.	"Godz N the Hood" (featuring Ras Kass, Bishop Lamont, M. K. Asante, Talib Kweli)		Chris Noxx	5:30
8.	"Oh Bitch You Weary" (featuring Amiri Baraka)		J-Dilla	2:15
9.	"Blood in My Eye"		Chris Noxx	1:43
10.	"My Victory" (featuring Maya Angelou)		J-Dilla	3:13
11.	"Wanderlust"		Commissioner Gordon	2:06
12.	"Outro [Wonderful]"		Commissioner Gordon	7:27
Total length:				39:10

== See also ==
- M. K. Asante
- Buck: A Memoir
- Javotti Media
