= Nephew (book) =

2024 memoir by M. K. Asante

Nephew: A Memoir in 4-Part Harmony
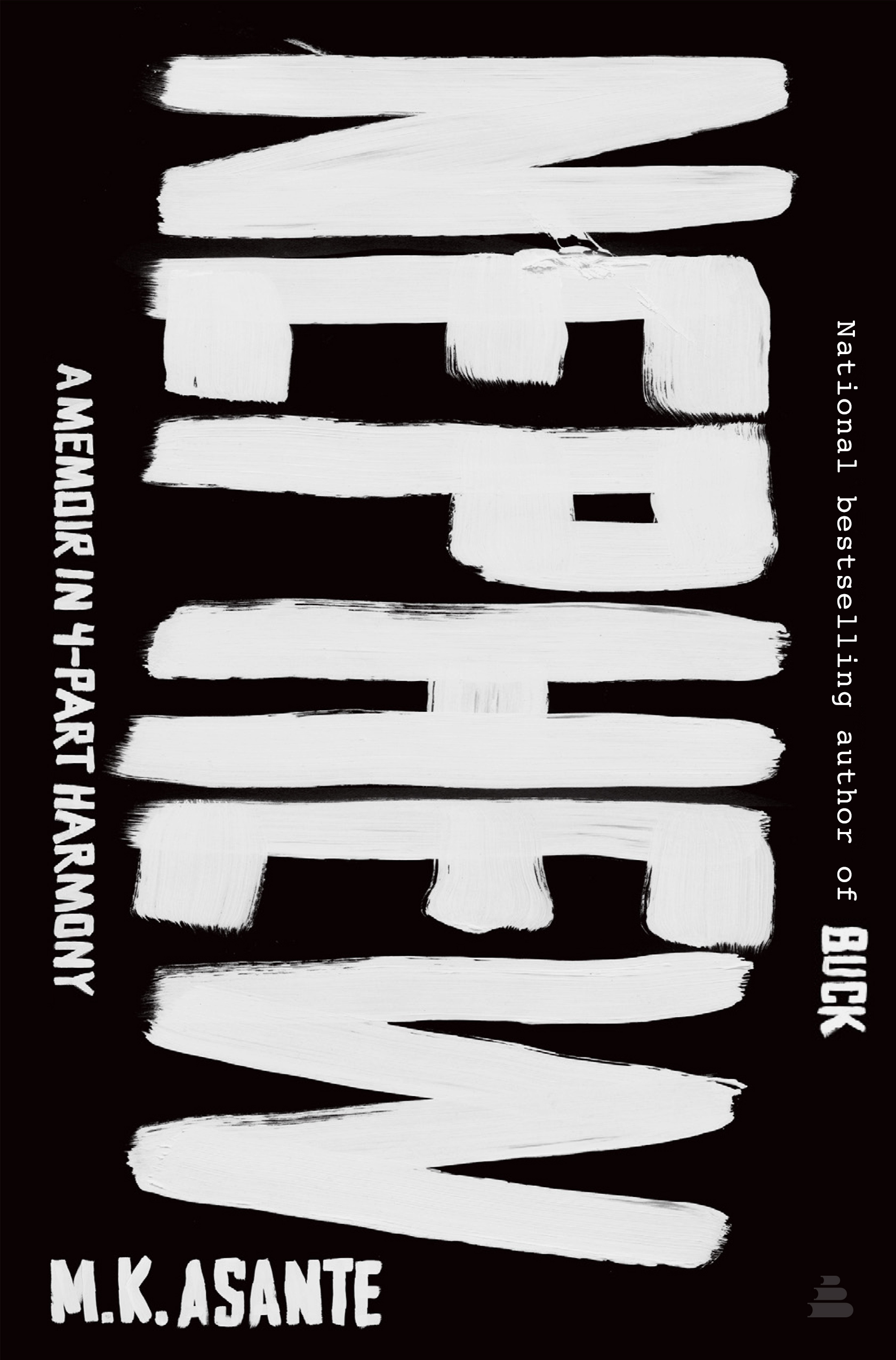
- Author: M. K. Asante
- Language: English
- Subject: Literature, pop culture, hip hop culture
- Genre: Memoir, African-American Studies
- Publisher: HarperCollins/Amistad Press
- Publication date: May 21, 2024
- Publication place: United States
- Media type: Print (Hardcover) e-Book (Kindle) audio (Audiobook)
- Pages: 208 pp
- ISBN: 9780063275287

Nephew: A Memoir in 4-Part Harmony is a memoir by M. K. Asante, published by HarperCollins/Amistad Press in May 2024. It is an epistolary memoir written to Asante's nephew, Nasir, who was shot nine times and survived.

== Critical reception ==
The Los Angeles Times, reviewing Nephew on May 17, 2024, wrote:

As with a great piece of music, the emotions and rhythms of that final chapter lingered in my mind long after I’d put down the book.”

Kirkus Reviews, reviewing Nephew in their April, 2024 issue, wrote:

"The author compellingly frames his family story within an account of historical struggles for Black liberty. Passionate, moving, spirited reflections on art's therapeutic potency.”

Booklist, reviewing Nephew for their April, 2024 edition, wrote:

"This beautifully crafted and inspiring narrative captures the essence of family life and showcases the power of love and perseverance in the face of adversity. YA's will find Asante's narrative deeply moving and illuminating."

Library Journal gave Nephew a starred review in their May issue, noting in their review:

"This poignant memoir about overcoming devastating odds is a treasure and likely to become a classic. Essential reading for deepening understanding of society, the world, familial relationships, and the meaning of art and life."

AudioFile (magazine), reviewing the Nephew audiobook, wrote:

"M.K. Asante's performance captures the essence of what makes the audiobook medium vital: a living experience that grabs listeners from start to finish... Listeners experience a collective performance that captures the power of art to touch the soul. The impact is exhilarating."

== Awards ==
- 2024: Earphones Award – AudioFile (magazine)
- 2024: Outstanding Audiobook – American Library Association
- 2025: In The Margins Book Award (nonfiction) – in the Margins Award
