= Rex Ogle =

American author & editor (born 1979/80)

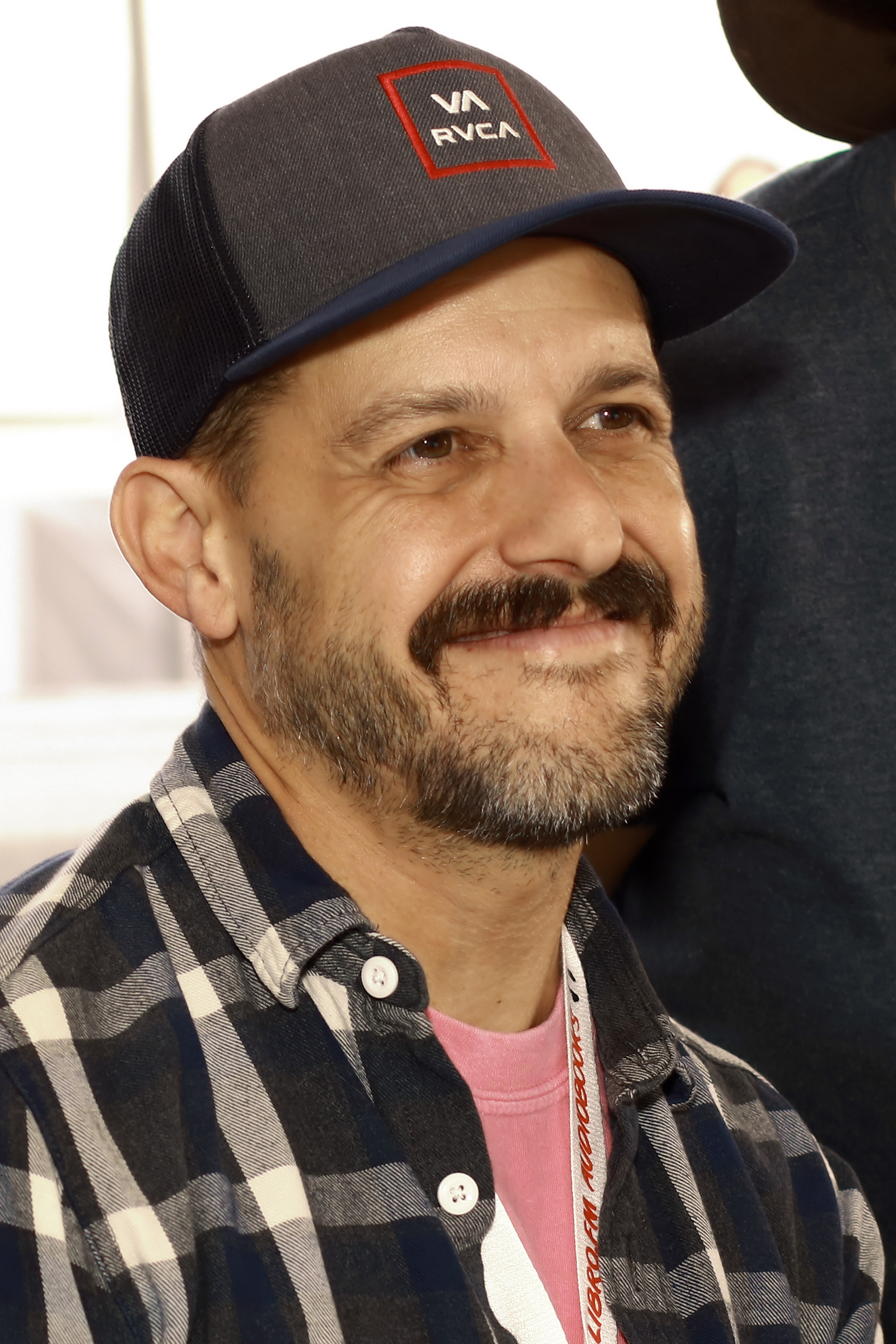
- Rex Ogle at the 2024 Texas Book Festival
- Occupation: Author
- Writing career
- Notable works: Free Lunch, Four Eyes: A Graphic Novel, Road Home, Absent
- Notable awards: Michael L. Printz Award Honor (2025); Stonewall Book Award Honor (2025); YALSA Award for Excellence in Nonfiction (2020); Cybils Award (2021)
- Website: rexogle.com

Rex Ogle (born 1979 or 1980) is an American author and editor who has published more than 100 books, including those written under various pseudonyms, such as Rey Terciero, Trey King, and Honest Lee. In addition to writing and editing for DC Comics and Marvel Comics, Ogle has written a number of graphic novels and memoirs, including Free Lunch.

== Biography ==
Ogle was born and raised in Texas with his mother and younger brother, as well as his mother's boyfriend and later his stepfather. He experienced poverty and domestic violence as a child, which he discusses in his memoir Free Lunch. In the book, he also discusses his lifelong experiences with depression, anxiety and panic attacks.

At age 18, Ogle came out to his parents and was immediately kicked out of his family home, after which he moved to New Orleans because he thought, "If I’m going to be homeless, I might as well be homeless somewhere cool." After a short while, he moved in with his grandmother, then eventually moved to New York City, where he interned with Marvel Comics.

In addition to Marvel, Ogle has served as editor with DC Comics, Scholastic, and Little, Brown Young Readers. While editing with Little, Brown Young Readers, he worked with Neil Patrick Harris on his debut children's book, The Magic Misfits.

As of 2020, Ogle lived in Los Angeles with his husband.

== Awards and honors ==
Ogle received a Michael L. Printz Award Honor and a Stonewall Book Award Honor for his third memoir, Road Home (2024). His debut memoir, Free Lunch (2019), was the winner of the YALSA Award for Excellence in Nonfiction for Young Adults.

Six of Ogle's books are Junior Library Guild selections: Free Lunch, Punching Bag (2021), Abuela, Don't Forget Me (2022), Road Home, Cara de Pizza (Pizza Face) (2025), and Fruitcake (2026).

Ogle's books have regularly landed on Best of Year lists. Road Home was named to best book lists by Amazon, Chicago Public Library, Kirkus Reviews, The Horn Book Magazine, and School Library Journal. In 2019, the Chicago Public Library and Kirkus Reviews named Free Lunch one of the best middle grade children's books of 2019. In 2021, the New York Public Library named Punching Bag one of the year's "Top 10 Books for Teens". In 2022, School Library Journal included Abuela, Don't Forget Me on their list of the year's best poetry books.

Awards for Ogle's writing
Year	Title	Award/Honor	Result	Ref.
2019	Free Lunch	Cybils Award for Middle Grade Nonfiction	Finalist	
2020	Free Lunch	YALSA Award for Excellence in Nonfiction	Winner	
2020	Free Lunch	In the Margins Award	Top 10	
2021	Punching Bag	Cybils Award for Senior High Nonfiction	Winner	
2022	Free Lunch	Rebecca Caudill Young Readers' Book Award	Nominee	
2023	Abuela, Don't Forget Me	Reading the West Book Award for Young Adult/Teen	Winner	
2023	Abuela, Don't Forget Me	YALSA Award for Excellence in Nonfiction	Finalist	
2024	Northranger	GLAAD Media Award Outstanding Original Graphic Novel/Anthology	Nominee	
2025	Road Home	Michael L. Printz Award	Honor	
2025	Road Home	Stonewall Book Award	Honor	

== Selected publications ==
=== Anthology contributions ===
- "Colors of June" in Hope Wins: A Collection of Inspiring Stories for Young Readers, edited by Rose Brock (2022)

=== Comics ===
Dates and other contributors (e.g., co-authors and illustrators) have not been provided below due to the on-going and team-based nature of comic book writing.

- All New X-Men
- The Conjuring: The Lover
- DC Pride 2023 (anthology)
- DC Universe Holiday Special
- Death of Wolverine: Life After Logan
- Justice League of America
- Strange Love Adventures
- Superman: Red and Blue
- Teen Titans: The Hunt for Raven
- The World of Flashpoint

=== Fiction books ===
==== Standalone novels ====
- Meg, Jo, Beth, and Amy: A Modern Graphic Retelling of Little Women, illustrated by Bre Indigo, original text by Louisa May Alcott (as Rey Terceiro, 2019)
- Blink, illustrated by Edú (2019)
- Swan Lake: Quest for the Kingdoms, illustrated by Megan Kearney (as Rey Terceiro, 2022)
- The Darkness We Brought Back, cowritten with Alex Segura, illustrated by Joe Eisma, colored by Manuel Puppo, and lettered by Taylor Esposito (2023)
- Northranger, illustrated by Bre Indigo (as Rey Terceiro, 2023)
- Dan of Green Gables, illustrated by Claudia Aguirre, original text by L. M. Montgomery (as Rey Terceiro, exp. 2025)
- When We Ride, a novel in verse (2025)
- Absent, illustrated by LJ-Baptiste (2026)

==== Classroom 13 series ====
The Classroom 13 books were published under the pseudonym Honest Lee. They were co-written with Matthew J. Gilbert and illustrated by Joëlle Dreidemy.

1. The Unlucky Lottery Winners of Classroom 13 (2017)
2. The Disastrous Magical Wishes of Classroom 13 (2017)
3. The Fantastic and Terrible Fame of Classroom 13 (2017)
4. The Happy and Heinous Halloween of Classroom 13 (2018)
5. The Rude and Ridiculous Royals of Classroom 13 (2018)
6. The Super Awful Superheroes of Classroom 13 (2018)

==== The Supernatural Society series ====
1. The Supernatural Society (2022)
2. Curse of the Werewolves (2022)
3. Rise of the Undead (2023)

=== Nonfiction books ===
- Free Lunch (2019)
- Punching Bag (2021)
- Abuela, Don't Forget Me (2022)
- Road Home (2024)

==== Four Eyes series ====
- Four Eyes: A Graphic Novel, illustrated by Dave Valeza (2023)
- Pizza Face: A Graphic Novel, illustrated by Dave Valeza (2024)
- ’’Fruitcake: A Graphic Novel’’, illustrated by Dave Valeza (2026)
