= List of Amistad Press books =

This is a list of books published by Amistad Press, an imprint of HarperCollins acquired in late October 1999. It is the oldest imprint devoted to the African-American market, and takes its name from a slave ship on which a revolt occurred in 1839. Charles F. Harris (1934–2015) started in the 1970s the quarterly anthology of black writing Amistad at Random House, where he worked as a senior editor from 1967, and it "went through a number of collaborative publishing ventures with large publishers" before being launched in 1986 as the independent imprint Amistad Press Inc. Harris joined HarperCollins as vice president of the imprint at the time of the 1999 merger, and remained as editorial director until 2003. The current editorial director is Tracy Sherrod, who joined the Amistad imprint in 2013.

Publishing about 10 titles a year, Amistad does not aim for commercial fiction success; it leans toward narrative nonfiction.

As of December 2020, approximately 154 Amistad Press books are listed by the publisher as in print.

== 0-9 ==
- 32 Candles: A Novel, Ernessa T. Carter (2011)

== A ==
- Act Like a Lady, Think Like a Man, Steve Harvey (2009)
- Act Like a Success, Think Like a Success: Discovering Your Gift and the Way to Life's Riches, Steve Harvey (2014)
- African Beginnings, James Haskins and Kathleen Benson (1998)
- After the Dance: My Life with Marvin Gaye, Jan Gaye (2015)
- The Air Between Us: A Novel, Deborah Johnson (2009)
- Alek: My Life from Sudanese Refugee to International Supermodel, Alek Wek (2008)
- All Aunt Hagar's Children: Stories, Edward P. Jones (2006)
- All the Right Stuff, Walter Dean Myers (2012)
- American Tapestry: The Story of the Black, White, and Multiracial Ancestors of Michelle Obama, Rachel L. Swarns (2013)
- Another Brooklyn, Jacqueline Woodson (2016)
- At Home with Muhammad Ali, Hana Ali (2019)
- Autobiography of My Dead Brother, Walter Dean Myers (2005)

== B ==
- Bad Boy: A Memoir, Walter Dean Myers (2001)
- Balm: A Novel, Dolen Perkins-Valdez (2015)
- Barracoon: The Story of the Last "Black Cargo", Zora Neale Hurston (2018)
- Beauty and the Beast, H. Chuku Lee (2014)
- Bebop Express, H. L. Panahi (2005)
- Before the Legend: The Rise of Bob Marley, Christopher Farley (2007)
- Better Than Good Hair: The Curly Girl Guide to Healthy, Gorgeous Natural Hair!, Nikki Walton and Ernessa T. Carter (2013)
- Between Father and Son: An African-American Fable, Eric V. Copage (2005)
- Big Jabe, Jerdine Nolen (2003)
- Biscuit Wants to Play Spinner Rack, Alyssa Satin Capucilli (2001)
- Black Detroit: A People's History of Self-Determination, Herb Boyd (2017)
- Black is Brown is Tan, Arnold Adoff (2002)
- Black Pearls: Daily Meditations, Affirmations, and Inspirations for African-Americans, Eric V. Copage (2005)
- Black Pearls for Parents: Meditations, Affirmations, and Inspirations for African-American Parents, Eric V. Copage (2005)
- The Blacker the Berry, Joyce Carol Thomas (2008)
- The Book of Luke: My Fight for Truth, Justice, and Liberty City, Luther Campbell and Tanner Colby (2015)
- Bound for Canaan: The Epic Story of the Underground Railroad, America's First Civil Rights Movement, Fergus Bordewich (2006)
- Boycott Blues: How Rosa Parks Inspired a Nation, Andrea Davis Pinkney (2008)
- Brick by Brick, Charles R. Smith, Jr. (2012)
- Bronzeville Boys and Girls, Gwendolyn Brooks (2006)
- Brothers & Sisters: Family Poems, Eloise Greenfield (2008)
- Building a New Land: African Americans in Colonial America, James Haskins and Kathleen Benson (2001)
- Burn My Heart, Beverley Naidoo (2008)
- By Love Possessed: Stories, Lorna Goodison (2012)

== C ==
- Career GPS: Strategies for Women Navigating the New Corporate Landscape, Linda Villarosa (2011)
- Chasing Space, Leland Melvin (2017)
- Coach Carter, Jasmine Jones (2004)
- Come to Win: Business Leaders, Artists, Doctors, and Other Visionaries on How Sports Can Help You Top Your Profession, Venus Williams and Kelly E. Carter (2011)
- Confessions of a Video Vixen, Karrine Steffans (2006)
- Conversations with God: Two Centuries of Prayers by African Americans, James M. Washington (2014)
- Coretta Scott, Ntozake Shange (2009)
- Crystal, Walter Dean Myers (2002)
- A Cupboard Full of Coats: A Novel, Yvvette Edwards (2012)

== D ==
- Danitra Brown, Class Clown, Nikki Grimes (2005)
- Danitra Brown Leaves Town, Nikki Grimes (2001)
- Darius & Twig, Walter Dean Myers (2013)
- Dark Girls, Bill Duke and Shelia P. Moses (2014)
- Daughters of Men, Rachel Vassel (2011)
- Deconstructing Sammy: Music, Money, Madness, and the Mob, Matt Birkbeck (2008)
- Dr. Susan Taylor's Rx for Brown Skin: Your Prescription for Flawless Skin, Hair, and Nails, Susan C. Taylor (2008)
- Defining Moments in Black History: Reading Between the Lies, Dick Gregory (2017)
- Donavan's Double Trouble, Monalisa DeGross (2007)
- Donavan's Word Jar, Monalisa DeGross (1998)
- Don't Ever Wonder: A Novel, Darren Coleman (2005)
- Don't Know Much About Martin Luther King Jr., Kenneth C. Davis (2005)
- Doo-Wop Pop, Roni Schotter (2008)
- Dope Sick, Walter Dean Myers (2009)
- The Dream Bearer, Walter Dean Myers (2003)

== E ==
- Embracing the Love God Wants You to Have: A Life of Peace, Joy, and Victory, Taffi Dollar (2014)
- Endangered: A Novel, Jean Love Cush (2014)
- Escaping the Delta: Robert Johnson and the Invention of the Blues, Elijah Wald (2014)
- Every Time a Rainbow Dies, Rita Williams-Garcia (2001)
- Eye on the Struggle: Ethel Payne, the First Lady of the Black Press, James McGrath Morris (2015)

== F ==
- Fake ID, Lamar Giles (2014)
- Fat Albert: Gonna Have a Good Time!, Acton Figueroa (2004)
- Fat Albert: Hey, Hey, Hey!, Acton Figueroa (2004)
- Fat Albert: The Movie Novel, Mike Milligan (2004)
- Finding Samuel Lowe: China, Jamaica, Harlem, Paula Williams Madison (2015)
- Flower Girl Butterflies, Beth Fitzgerald Howard (2004)
- Forty Minutes of Hell: The Extraordinary Life of Nolan Richardson, Rus Bradburd (2011)
- Freedom's a-Callin Me, Ntozake Shange (2012)
- The Friendly Four, Eloise Greenfield (2006)
- From Harvey River: A Memoir of My Mother and Her Island, Lorna Goodison (2009)

== G ==
- God Bless the Child, Billie Holiday, Jr. and Arthur Herzog, Jr. (2003)
- God, Can You Hear Me?, Justine Simmons, Robert Papp and Rev Run (2007)
- God Loves Haiti: A Novel, Dimitry Elias Léger (2015)
- Gone Crazy in Alabama, Rita Williams-Garcia (2015)
- The Gospel Cinderella, Joyce Carol Thomas (2004)
- The Great Migration: Journey to the North, Eloise Greenfield (2010)
- Guardian, Julius Lester (2008)

== H ==
- Handbook for Boys: A Novel, Walter Dean Myers (2002)
- The Harlem Hellfighters: When Pride Met Courage, Walter Dean Myers and Bill Miles (2005)
- Harlem Renaissance Party, Faith Ringgold (2015)
- Harriet Tubman: Conductor on the Underground Railroad, Ann Petry (1995)
- Hattie McDaniel: Black Ambition, White Hollywood, Jill Watts (2007)
- He Said, She Said, Kwame Alexander (2013)
- Hold the Flag High, Catherine Clinton (2005)
- Honey, I Love, Eloise Greenfield (2002)
- Honoring Sergeant Carter: A Family's Journey to Uncover the Truth About an American Hero, Allene Carter and Robert L. Allen (2004)
- A House Is Not a Home: A B-Boy Blues Novel, James Earl Hardy (2006)
- How They Got Over: African Americans and the Call of the Sea, Eloise Greenfield (2002)
- Hush, Little Baby, Brian Pinkney (2006)

== I ==
- I Am Number Four, Pittacus Lore (2011)
- I Can Make a Difference: A Treasury to Inspire Our Children, Marian Wright Edelman (2005)
- Ida B. Wells: Let the Truth Be Told, Walter Dean Myers (2008)
- I'll Find a Way or Make One: A Tribute to Historically Black Colleges and Universities, Dwayne Ashley, Juan Williams, and Adrienne Ingrum (2007)
- I'm Every Woman: Remixed Stories of Marriage, Motherhood, and Work, Lonnae O'Neal Parker (2006)
- In the Land of Milk and Honey, Joyce Carol Thomas (2012)
- In the Land of Words: New and Selected Poems, Eloise Greenfield (2003)
- In My Momma's Kitchen, Jerdine Nolen (1999)
- In the Spirit, Susan L. Taylor (1994)
- It Ain't All for Nothin', Walter Dean Myers (2003)
- I've Seen the Promised Land: The Life of Dr. Martin Luther King, Jr., Walter Dean Myers (2003)

== J ==
- Jumped, Rita Williams-Garcia (2009)
- Just As I Am, Cicely Tyson (2021)
- Justin and the Best Biscuits in the World, Mildred Pitts Walter (2010)

== K ==
- Keep Your Head to the Sky: My Life with Earth, Wind & Fire, Maurice White and Herb Powell (2015)
- The Known World, Edward P. Jones (2003)

== L ==
- Langston Hughes: American Poet, Alice Walker (1974)
- Let the Lion Eat Straw, Ellease Southerland (2005)
- Let's Get It On: A Novel, Jill Nelson (2010)
- Let's Talk About Race, Julius Lester (2005)
- The Life of Herod the Great, Zora Neale Hurston (2025)
- Lift Every Voice and Sing, James Weldon Johnson (2007)
- Little Divas, Philana Marie Boles (2005)
- The Little Mouse ABC, Katharine Holabird (1983)
- Lockdown, Walter Dean Myers (2010)
- Lone Bean, Chudney Ross (2012)
- Lost in the City: Stories, Edward P. Jones (2012)
- A Love Noire: A Novel, Erica Simone Turnipseed (2004)
- Love the One You're With: A B-Boy Blues Novel, James Earl Hardy (2003)

== M ==
- Mahalia Jackson: Walking with Kings and Queens, Nina Nolan (2015)
- Malcolm X: A Fire Burning Brightly, Walter Dean Myers (2003)
- A Man for All Seasons: The Life of George Washington Carver, Stephen Krensky (2008)
- Marshalling Justice: The Early Civil Rights Letters of Thurgood Marshall, Michael G. Long (2011)
- Martin Scorsese Presents The Blues: A Musical Journey, Peter Guralnick, Robert Santelli, and Holly George-Warren (2004)
- McGuffey's Eclectic Primer, William Holmes McGuffey (1979)
- Me & Neesie, Eloise Greenfield (2004)
- Memories of Sun: Stories of Africa and America, Jane Kurtz (2003)
- Miss Jessie's: Creating a Successful Business from Scratch---Naturally, Miko Branch (2015)
- Mr. and Mrs. Prince: How an Extraordinary Eighteenth-Century Family Moved Out of Slavery and into Legend, Gretchen Holbrook Gerzina (2009)
- Monster, Walter Dean Myers (1999)
- Monster's Chef: A Novel, Jervey Tervalon (2014)
- More: A Novel, Austin Clarke (2009)
- The Mother of Black Hollywood, Jenifer Lewis (2017)
- Mufaro's Beautiful Daughters, John Steptoe (1987)
- Music from Our Lord's Holy Heaven, Brian Pinkney (2005)
- My Daddy, Dr. Martin Luther King, Jr., Martin Luther King, III (2013)

== N ==
- The Neighborhood Mother Goose, Nina Crews (2004)
- Nephew: A Memoir in Four-Part Harmony, MK Asante (2024)
- A Nest Full of Stars, James Berry (2004)
- New Daughters of Africa: An International Anthology of Writing by Women of African Descent, ed. Margaret Busby (2019)
- No Laughter Here, Rita Williams-Garcia (2003)
- Not Guilty, Jabari Asim (2013)
- Now Is Your Time! The African-American Struggle for Freedom, Walter Dean Myers (1992)

== O ==
- O Holy Night: Christmas with the Boys Choir of Harlem, Faith Ringgold (2004)
- Obama: From Promise to Power, David Mendell (2007)
- Obama: The Historic Campaign in Photographs, Deborah Willis and Kevin Merida (2008)
- Obama: A Promise of Change, David Mendell (2008)
- One Crazy Summer, Rita Williams-Garcia (2010)
- The Other Side of Truth, Beverley Naidoo (2012)

== P ==
- P.S. Be Eleven, Rita Williams-Garcia (2013)
- Passport Diaries: A Novel, Tamara Gregory (2006)
- Pictures for Miss Josie, Sandra Belton (2003)
- Pitching in for Eubie, Jerdine Nolen (2007)
- The Polished Hoe: A Novel, Austin Clarke (2004)
- Pound for Pound: A Biography of Sugar Ray Robinson, Herb Boyd and Ray Robinson, Jr. (2006)
- A Pride of African Tales, Donna Washington (2003)
- The Pursuit of Happyness, Chris Gardner (2006)

== R ==
- Ray & the Best Family Reunion Ever, Mildred Pitts Walter (2002)
- Redbone: The Millionaire and the Gold Digger, Ron Stodghill (2008)

== S ==
- Satch & Me, Dan Gutman (2006)
- Scorpions, Walter Dean Myers (1988)
- Shifting Through Neutral, Bridgett M. Davis (2005)
- Shooter, Walter Dean Myers (2004)
- Should America Pay? Slavery and the Raging Debate on Reparations, Raymond Winbush PhD (2003)
- Spectacle: The Astonishing Life of Ota Benga, Pamela Newkirk (2015)
- Spinning the Globe: The Rise, Fall, and Return to Greatness of the Harlem Globetrotters, Ben Green (2006)
- Start Where You Are: Life Lessons in Getting from Where You Are to Where You Want to Be, Chris Gardner and Mim E. Rivas (2009)
- Straight Talk, No Chaser: How to Find, Keep, and Understand a Man, Steve Harvey (2010)
- Street Love, Walter Dean Myers (2006)
- Suitcase, Mildred Pitts Walter (2006)
- Sweet Whispers, Brother Rush, Virginia Hamilton (1983)

== T ==
- A Teacher's Guide to American Tapestry: Common-Core Aligned Teacher Materials and a Sample Chapter, Rachel L. Swarns and Amy Jurskis (2014)
- This Is the Dream, Diane Z. Shore and Jessica Alexander (2005)
- This Voice in My Heart: A Runner's Memoir of Genocide, Faith, and Forgiveness, Gilbert Tuhabonye and Gary Brozek (2007)

== U ==
- Unburnable, Marie-Elena John (2007)
- Unruly: The Highs and Lows of Becoming a Man, Ja Rule (2014)

== V ==
- The Vow: A Novel, Denene Millner, Angela Burt-Murray, and Mitzi Miller (2006)

== W ==
- Walter Dean Myers, Walter Dean Myers (2003)
- The Warrior Method: A Parents' Guide to Rearing Healthy Black Boys, Raymond A. Winbush (2001)
- Washington: How Slaves, Idealists, and Scoundrels Created the Nation's Capital, Fergus Bordewich (2008)
- We Troubled the Waters, Ntozake Shange (2009)
- We Were There: Voices of African American Veterans, from World War II to the War in Iraq, Yvonne Latty and Ron Tarver (2005)
- Web of Lies, Beverley Naidoo (2006)
- Wench: A Novel, Dolen Perkins-Valdez (2010)
- When Grandmama Sings, Margaree King Mitchell (2012)
- When Harriet Met Sojourner, Catherine Clinton (2007)
- The White Masai: My Exotic Tale of Love and Adventure, Corinne Hofmann (2007)
- Winning the Money Game: Lessons Learned from the Financial Fouls of Pro Athletes, Adonal Foyle (2015)
- Words of Wisdom: Daily Affirmations of Faith, Rev Run (2006)
- Words with Wings: A Treasury of African-American Poetry and Art, Belinda Rochelle (2000)

== Y ==
- Your Brain Is a Muscle Too: How Student Athletes Succeed in College and in Life, Andre Hayes and Vince Fudzie (2013)
