= The Black Candle =

- Directed by: M. K. Asante
- Written by: M. K. Asante; Maya Angelou (poetry)
- Produced by: M. K. Asante; Ben Haaz; Kenny Gamble; Walter Lomax
- Starring: Maya Angelou; Chuck D Dead Prez; Kiri Davis; Ursula Rucker; Jim Brown; Haki Madhubuti
- Narrated by: Maya Angelou
- Music by: Nnenna Freelon, Derrick Hodge, Robert Glasper, Chris Dave
- Release date: November 2008
- Running time: 71 minutes
- Language: English

The Black Candle is a documentary film about Kwanzaa directed by M. K. Asante and narrated by Maya Angelou. The film premiered on cable television on Starz in November 2012.

== Synopsis ==
The Black Candle uses Kwanzaa as a vehicle to explore and celebrate the African-American experience. Narrated by the poet Maya Angelou and directed by author and filmmaker M. K. Asante, The Black Candle is about the struggle and triumph of African-American family, community, and culture. The documentary traces the holiday's growth out of the Black Power Movement in the 1960s to its present-day reality.

== Reception ==
Time magazine wrote "The first film about Kwanzaa, The Black Candle, narrated by Maya Angelou is fit for a poet."

The Daily Voice wrote, "I predict that viewing The Black Candle will become an annual family tradition in homes around the world."

The film won Best Full Length Documentary at the 2009 Africa World Documentary Film Festival.

In December 2020, the American Film Institute selected The Black Candle as a "holiday classic" and featured the film in AFI Movie Club Presents: Home for the Holidays, "highlighting the very best of the holiday cinema".
