= The Life of Herod the Great =

Unfinished novel by Zora Neale Hurston

The Life of Herod The Great
- Author: Zora Neale Hurston
- Language: English
- Published: January 7, 2025
- Publisher: HarperCollins/Amistad Press
- Publication place: United States
- Pages: 368

The Life of Herod the Great is an unfinished novel by Zora Neale Hurston, published posthumously in 2025 with commentary by Deborah G. Plant. It depicts the life of Herod the Great, a client king of the Herodian kingdom of Judea. The novel was published on January 7, 2025, to coincide with Hurston's birthday.

== Background ==
Hurston worked on the novel for years prior to her death in 1960. Hurston's publisher Scribner's turned it down in 1955, with editor Burroughs Mitchell saying Herod "does not seem to us to accomplish its intention. I mean to say that it does not vividly recreate the man and his time.". David McKay Publications and Harper & Brothers also passed on the book in 1958 and 1959, respectively. Hurston had high hopes in the novel, asking Winston Churchill to write an accompanying commentary, to which he declined. She also believed it could be adapted to Hollywood, floating the idea of adaptations by Cecil B. DeMille or Orson Welles.

Left in a trunk at her home, it and other unfinished works by Hurston were nearly destroyed in a fire when a janitor set her papers on fire, but a friend of Hurston used a hose to put it out. Prior to its publication, the manuscript was in the University of Florida archives.

== Plot ==
The novel begins with Herod at age 25, appointed as governor of Galilee by his father. As ruler, Herod gets rid of bandit Hezekiah and his followers, earning the respect of Galilee's residents but disapproval in Jerusalem. He is put on trial by King Hyrcanus but is set free by the court.

Due to Hurston's death, parts of the novel, especially near the conclusion, are left unfinished.

== Reception ==
Prior to its publication, Hurston biographer Robert Hemenway said the manuscript "suffers from poor characterization, pedantic scholarship, and inconsistent style; the whole performance touches the heart by revealing a talent in ruins" and that it would have been a "minor work". Louis Menand, writing for The New Yorker, said "her voice is missing. There is no poetry in 'Herod.' Instead, we are walked stiffly through the career of the man the Romans treated as the king of the client state of Judea, which he governed from 40 B.C.E. until his death, thirty-six years later—an impressive run at a time when one held on to power by preëmptively killing one’s rivals, something the historical Herod was quite good at."

Publishers Weekly called the novel "an intriguing counterpoint to the biblical 'massacre of the innocents' story". Writing in The Washington Post, Gerald Early said the novel needed a lot of work, but was still engrossing due to Hurston's enthusiasm in the subject. The Telegraph gave the novel a 3/5, saying it had too little of Hurston's "trademark nuance" and that it was "too thorough" in its rehabilitation of Herod.
