= The Crefeld School =

Location
- 8836 Crefeld Street; Philadelphia, Pennsylvania; United States
- 40.0765°N 75.2149°W

Information
- Former name: The Miquon Upper School
- Established: 1970; 56 years ago
- NCES School ID: 01909171
- Head of school: George Zeleznik
- Faculty: 23
- Grades: 7-12
- Enrollment: 101
- Accreditation: Pennsylvania Association of Independent Schools (PAIS) and Middle States Association Commissions on Elementary and Secondary Schools
- Website: www.crefeld.org

The Crefeld School is an alternative school for students in grades seven through twelve in Chestnut Hill, Philadelphia. The Crefeld School is home to The Crefeld glass studio.

== History and mission ==
The Crefeld School was founded as The Miquon Upper School in 1970 by Arnold Greenberg. Greenberg, a former teacher at The Miquon School (a private progressive elementary school founded in 1932), created the new upper school partly in response to requests from parents and former students from The Miquon School who wanted the opportunity to continue their schooling in the tradition of progressive education. Greenberg was granted permission by The Miquon School's board to include the "Miquon" name in the title of his new school, but the two schools were always entirely independent of each other. To avoid confusion, the upper school eventually changed its name to The Crefeld School.

== Enrollment and demographics ==
For the 2023-2024 school year, Crefeld enrolled 91 students in grades 7-12. The student body is approximately 34% students of color.

== Accreditation ==
Crefeld is not accredited by the Pennsylvania Department of Education. However, Crefeld is accredited by the Pennsylvania Association of Independent Schools (PAIS).

== Notable alumni ==
- M. K. Asante, poet, filmmaker, and professor
- Eugene Byrd, actor
- Annie Lederman, comedian
