= Buck: A Memoir =

2013 memoir by M. K. Asante

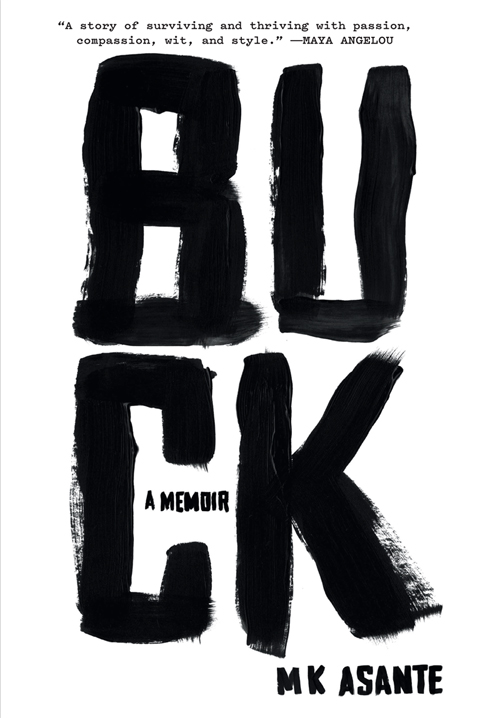
- Cover of Buck: A Memoir by M. K. Asante
- Author: M. K. Asante
- Language: English
- Subject: Literature, pop culture, hip hop culture
- Genre: Memoir, African-American Studies
- Publisher: Random House/Spiegel & Grau
- Publication date: August 20, 2013
- Publication place: United States
- Media type: Print (Hardcover) e-Book (Kindle) audio (Audiobook)
- Pages: 272 pp
- ISBN: 0812993411

Buck is a memoir by M. K. Asante, published by Random House/Spiegel & Grau. Buck tells the story of Asante's youth growing up in Philadelphia from the perspective of Asante as a teenager. Buck illustrates Asante's struggles with the disintegration of his family and the city's urban decay. Buck is often described as inspirational because it details Asante's discovery of his talent for writing at 16 and his decision to pursue it as a career. The paperback edition of Buck made The Washington Post Bestseller List in 2014 and 2015.

== Critical reception ==
Buck was selected as a Barnes & Noble Discover Great New Writers pick. It was also a Los Angeles Times Summer pick and received starred reviews from both Publishers Weekly and Booklist. Buck was nominated for an NAACP Image Award for Outstanding Literary Work. Buck is an Alex Award nominee and a recipient of the In The Margins Book Award.

Maya Angelou wrote:

Buck is a story of surviving and thriving with passion, compassion, wit, and style... Yes, MK Asante, please continue to live, to accept your liberation, to accept how valuable you are to your country and admit that you are very necessary to us all.

NPR reported:

In America, we have a tradition of black writers whose autobiographies and memoirs come to define an era. ...Buck may be this generation's story.

The Los Angeles Times wrote:

Frequently brilliant and always engaging ... It takes great skill to render the wide variety of characters, male and female, young and old, that populate a memoir like Buck. Asante [is] at his best when he sets out into the city of Philadelphia itself. In fact, that city is the true star of this book. Philly’s skateboarders, its street-corner philosophers and its tattoo artists are all brought vividly to life here. ... Asante’s memoir will find an eager readership, especially among young people searching in books for the kind of understanding and meaning that eludes them in their real-life relationships. ... A powerful and captivating book.”

The San Francisco Book Review wrote:

Every fifty years or so, a book is written with the power to change lives and reveal a totally new way of looking at the world. Buck is a work of genius and is such a book. To such writers as Dickens, Twain, Douglas, Lee, Angelou and Kerouac we now add the name Asante.

Essence magazine wrote:

[M. K.] Asante is the voice of a new generation. ...You will love nearly everything about Buck.

Salon wrote:

The debut of a remarkable talent ... Asante’s prose is a fluid blend of vernacular swagger and tender poeticism.

Publishers Weekly wrote:

Asante's noir chronicle is imaginative, powerful, and electric, written with passion and conviction.

Buffalo News wrote:

Buck is so honest it floats—even while it’s so down-to-earth that the reader feels like an ant peering up from the concrete. It’s a powerful book. . . . Asante is a hip-hop raconteur, a storyteller in the Homeric tradition, an American, a rhymer, a big-thinker singing a song of himself. You’ll want to listen.

Booklist wrote:

This is an inspiring story about perseverance and finding purpose that is sure to appeal to readers interested in hip-hop, black studies, and American pop culture in general.

Kirkus Reviews wrote:

The book’s strength lies in Asante’s vibrant, specific observations, and, at times, the percussive prose that captures them. The author’s fluid, filmic images of black urban life feel unique and disturbing.

Los Angeles Magazine wrote:

... beautifully written and expertly told ode to the power of art and literature.

== Awards and honors ==
- 2014 In the Margins Book Award
- 2014 Outstanding Literary Work - Autobiography nominee - NAACP Image Awards
- 2014 Alex Award finalist - American Library Association
- 2014 Feature Film Program Grant (movie adaptation) – Sundance Institute
- 2013 Inspirational Memoir finalist - Books for a Better Life Awards
- 2013 Best Book of 2013 – Baltimore Magazine
- 2013 Discover Great New Writers Selections - Barnes & Noble

== Movie adaptation ==
In 2014, Asante received a Sundance Institute Feature Film Program Grant to write and direct the movie adaptation of Buck. The grant provided resources for the film's production and development, granting Asante creative control over the project's timeline and release.

== Book soundtrack ==
The Buck: Original Book Soundtrack is a soundtrack album to the book Buck: A Memoir. The soundtrack is M. K. Asante's debut as a rapper and features production and vocals from Talib Kweli, Maya Angelou, Amiri Baraka, J Dilla, Madlib and others.

The soundtrack, presented by Talib Kweli's Javotti Media record label, is free. "Buck, the memoir is important not just for its scope and passion," Kweli told AllHipHop.com, "but for the author’s refusal to apologize for existing. The accompanying soundtrack allows you to engulf yourself in this world. When you do, you realize that this work of art is not just important, but necessary."

== Controversy ==
Asante praises The Crefeld School for helping him get his act together. However, comedian Annie Lederman noted in an interview with Ryan Sickler that Asante did not know the extent of child sexual abuse occurring at The Crefeld School when writing Buck. Asante told Lederman "I wish I had known that before I wrote this glowing book about it."
