= Mister Brown =

Mister Brown or Mr. Brown is a term used for male persons whose surname is Brown.

Mister Brown can also refer to:

== People ==
- John Brown (servant), Scottish personal attendant and favourite of Queen Victoria for many years
- mrbrown, Lee Kin Mum, a Singaporean blogger
- "Mr. Brown", the code name used by Peter Macari during his 1971 Qantas bomb hoax
- A pseudonym of William Makepeace Thackeray

=== Fictional characters ===
- Mr. Brown, the character played by Quentin Tarantino in Reservoir Dogs
- Deacon Leroy Brown, a character in the TV show Meet the Browns
- Mr Henry Brown, character in the Paddington Bear fictional universe
- Mr Brown/Jeremy Brown, the English teacher in the British show Mind Your Language

== Other uses ==
- Mr. Brown Coffee, a Taiwanese coffee brand
- "Mr. Brown", a song from Styles of Beyond's Megadef
- Mr. Brown (album), an album by Sleepy Brown
- "Mr. Brown" (song), a song by Bob Marley
- Mr. Brown, an Indian food franchise

== See also ==
- List of people with surname Brown
- Mrs. Brown (disambiguation)
