= It's Bigger Than Hip Hop =

Book by M. K. Asante

- cover of It's Bigger Than Hip Hop
- Author: M. K. Asante Jr.
- Language: English
- Subject: Music, hip hop culture
- Genre: Non-fiction, African-American Studies
- Publisher: St. Martin's Press
- Publication date: September 16th, 2008
- Publication place: United States
- Media type: Print (Hardcover, Paperback) e-Book (Kindle)
- Pages: 304 pp
- ISBN: 0-312-59302-3
- OCLC: 226966622

It's Bigger Than Hip Hop: The Rise of the Post-Hip-Hop Generation is a creative non-fiction book by M. K. Asante. It's Bigger Than Hip Hop employs hip hop culture as a vehicle to explore important social and political issues facing the hip hop and post-hip hop generations.

== Title ==
The title is a nod to rap group Dead Prez's song "Hip Hop".

== Critical reception ==
The book received very positive critical reviews from press outlets and the hip hop community. It was selected as a Top Book of the Year by the Kansas City Star.

Ari Bloomekatz of The Los Angeles Times wrote:

An empowering book that moves you to action and to question status quo America. Reading It's Bigger Than Hip Hop is motoring through a new generation of America with one of its best storytellers.

Chuck D of Public Enemy wrote:

A fantastic book! M.K. Asante, Jr. combines drive, skill and a commitment that buoys us all. The hip hop community should feel extremely blessed to have those qualities attached to its forward movement.

Jennifar Zarr in Library Journal wrote:

Asante expertly blends historical information about hip-hop and the civil rights movement with personal narrative, interviews with artists, and quotations from civil rights leaders and classic poetry to create an original and daring work.

Hip Hop Weekly wrote:

This is the book that many of us have been waiting for. The wisdom and overstanding he exemplifies in this work will astound the reader as he opens a third eye and breaks it all down. Extremely well-researched, well documented and very well written, this book is well paced and will have no difficulty holding the reader's attention.
