= Free Lunch (book) =

2019 middle-grade memoir by Rex Ogle

- Author: Rex Ogle
- Language: English
- Subject: Childhood poverty, Poverty in the United States
- Genre: Middle grade, Memoir
- Publisher: Norton Young Readers
- Publication date: September 10, 2019
- Media type: Print, Audio
- Pages: 224
- ISBN: 9781324016946

Free Lunch is a middle-grade memoir by Rex Ogle, published September 10, 2019, by Norton Young Readers. The book follows Ogle's middle school experience of being "a poor kid in a wealthy school district."

== Reception ==
Free Lunch is a Junior Library Guild selection and was generally well-received, including starred reviews from Kirkus Reviews, Publishers Weekly, and School Library Journal.

Kirkus Reviews called the book "A mighty portrait of poverty amid cruelty and optimism." Publishers Weekly applauded how Ogle "captures the experience of chronic poverty in the United States." They continued, stating that while "Ogle doesn’t shy away from the circumstances ... there is no shortage of humor, human kindness, and kid hijinks."

The Chicago Public Library and Kirkus Reviews named Free Lunch one of the best middle grade children's books of 2019.

Awards and honors for Free Lunch
Year	Award/Honor	Result	Ref.
2020	Excellence in Nonfiction for Young Adults Award	Winner	
2022	Rebecca Caudill Young Readers' Book Award	Nominee	
