= Jeff Rivera =

American novelist

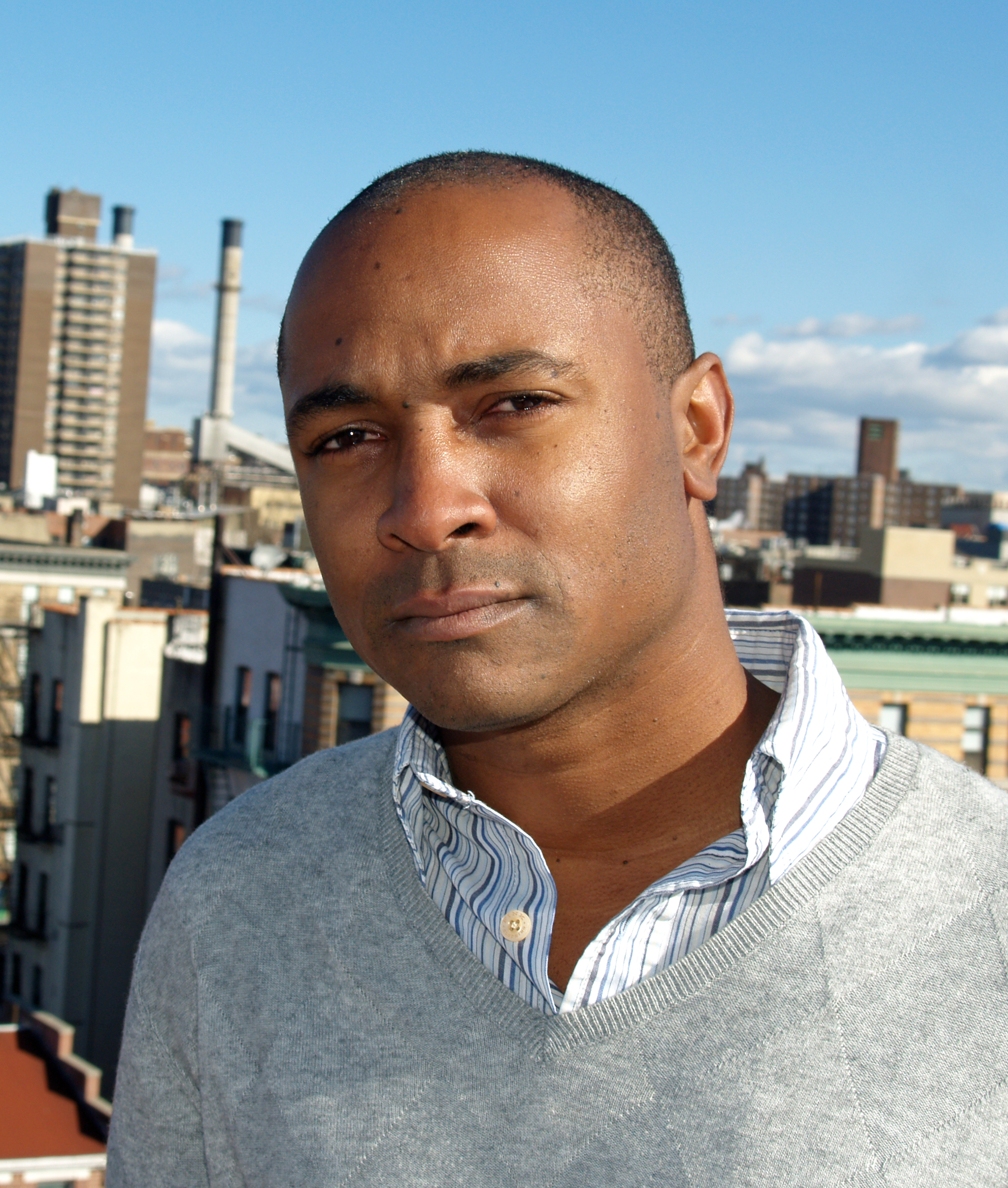
- Rivera in 2008.
- Born: September 5, 1976 (age 49); Salt Lake City, Utah, U.S.
- Occupations: Novelist, young adult fiction
- Writing career
- Period: 2003–present

Jeff Rivera (born September 5, 1976, in Salt Lake City, Utah), is an American novelist who writes books targeted at young adults. His most recent work, Forever My Lady, was released by Warner Books in July 2007. He is also the author of Oh Yes I Can! (2003).

== Forever My Lady ==
Forever My Lady is a story about a Latino juvenile delinquent who transforms his life in prison boot camp in order to win back the love of the girl he lost. Rivera was inspired to write the story when, after a period living in his car, he met a former gang member who turned his life around. Before it was picked up by Warner Books, 8,000 copies were in circulation in both print and electronic versions that Rivera had self-published.

Harriet Klausner called it "a terrific character driven redemption tale".

== Recognition ==
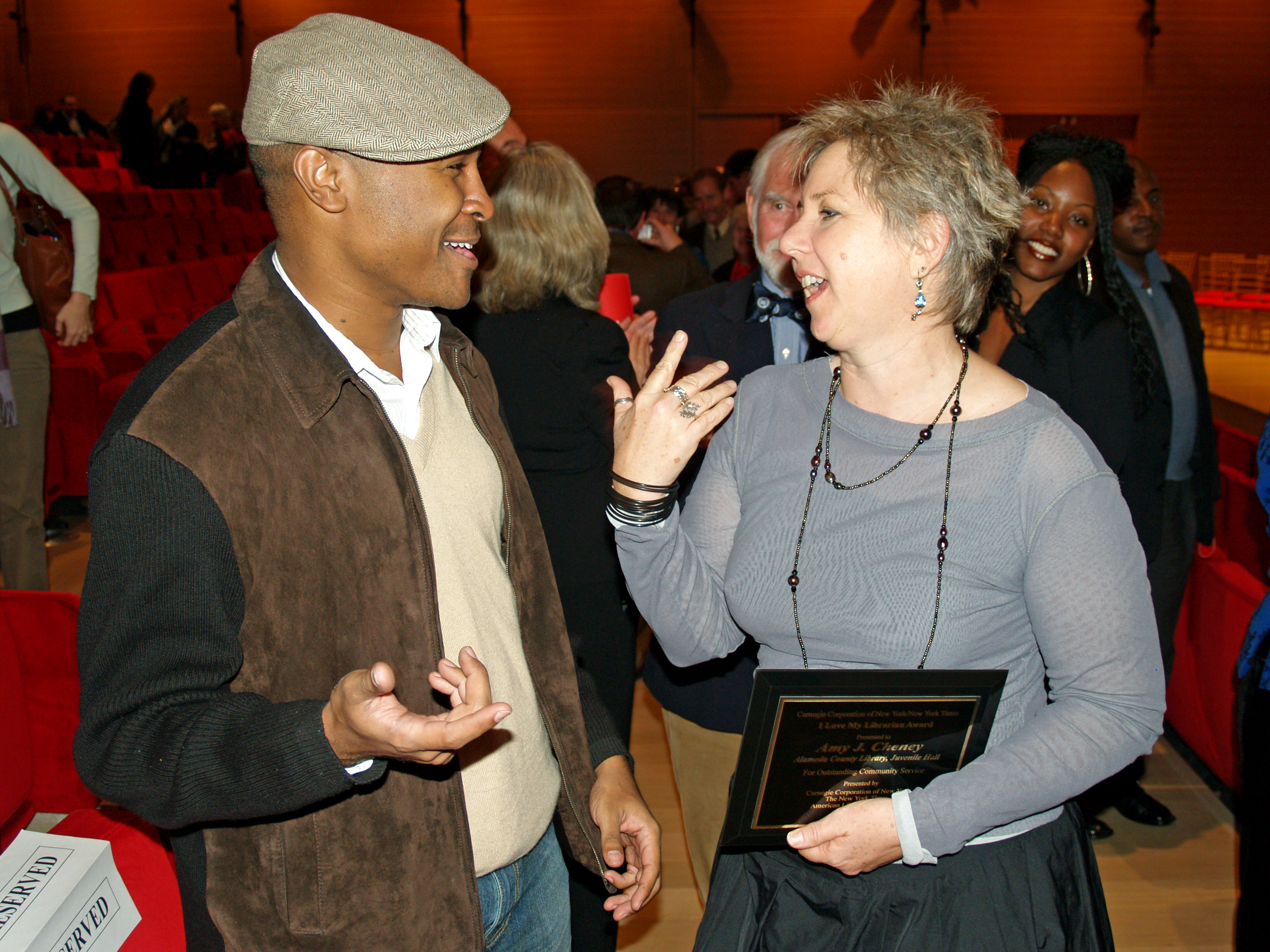
Rivera and Amy Cheney, at an awards ceremony honoring Cheney in The New York Times Building.

- Mahogany Media Award for Best New Author and Best Urban Fiction (2007)
