= M. K. Asante =

American author (born 1982)

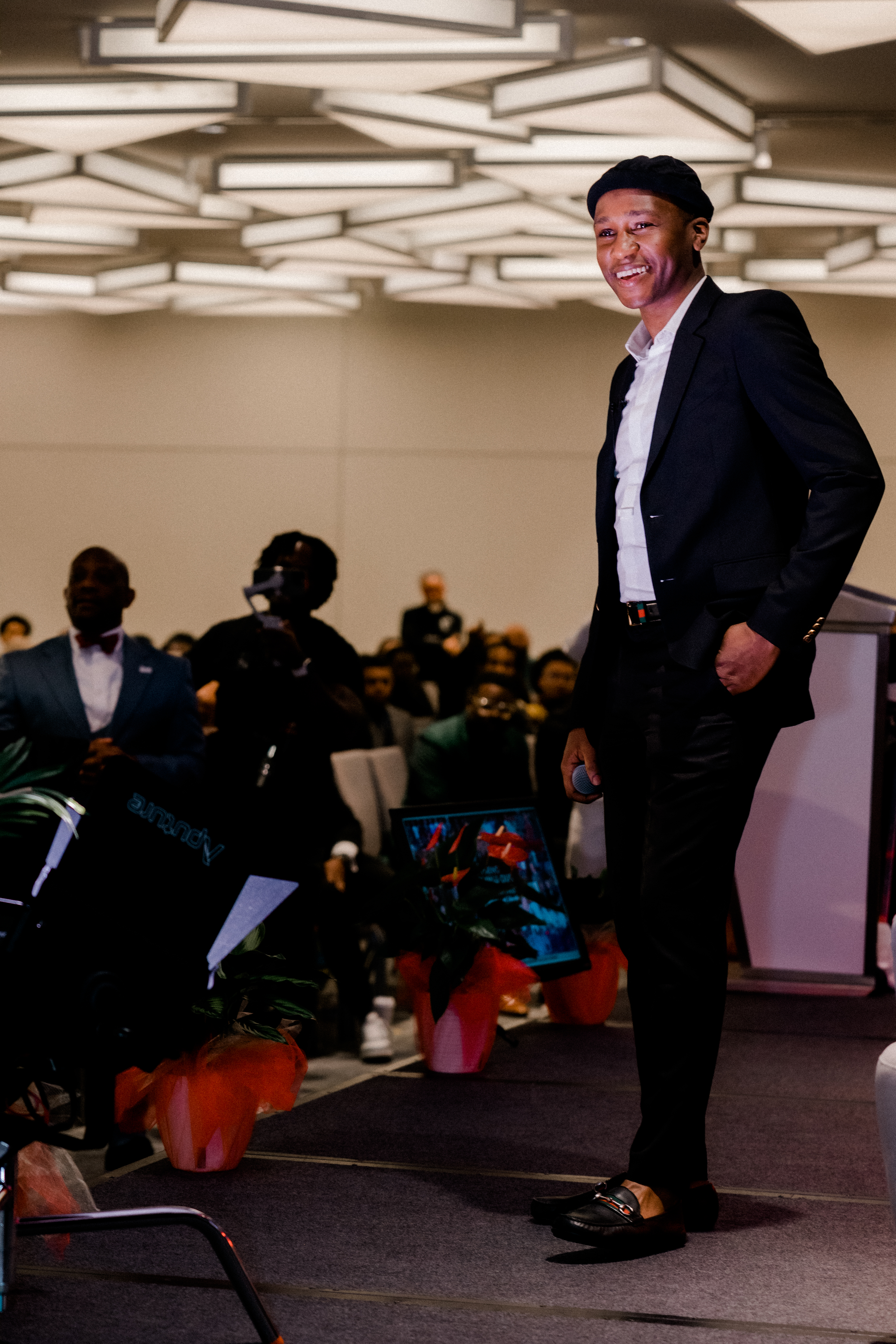
- Asante speaking at Amend Conference in 2024
- Born: November 3, 1982 (age 43); Harare, Zimbabwe
- Education: UCLA School of Theater, Film and Television; University of London, SOAS; Lafayette College
- Occupations: Writer; director; professor; producer; recording artist; songwriter
- Parent(s): Molefi Kete Asante and Kariamu Welsh
- Writing career
- Genres: Memoir, creative nonfiction, poetry, hip-hop, African-American literature, documentary
- Notable works: Buck: A Memoir; While Black with MK Asante

YouTube information
- Channel: MK Asante Productions
- Subscribers: 69 thousand
- Views: 34 million
- Last updated: 15 May 2026

M. K. Asante (born November 3, 1982) is an American author, filmmaker, songwriter, recording artist, and professor. He is the author of the 2013 best-selling memoir Buck: A Memoir and the 2024 memoir Nephew: A Memoir in Four-Part Harmony.

== Early life and education ==
Asante was born in Harare, Zimbabwe, and raised in Philadelphia. He is the son of scholar Molefi Kete Asante and choreographer Kariamu Welsh.

Asante is a graduate of The Crefeld School in the Chestnut Hill section of Philadelphia.

He studied film and literature at SOAS University of London. He earned a BA in Africana Studies and English from Lafayette College in Easton, Pennsylvania, and a MFA in screenwriting from UCLA School of Theater Film and Television.

== Career ==
=== Books ===
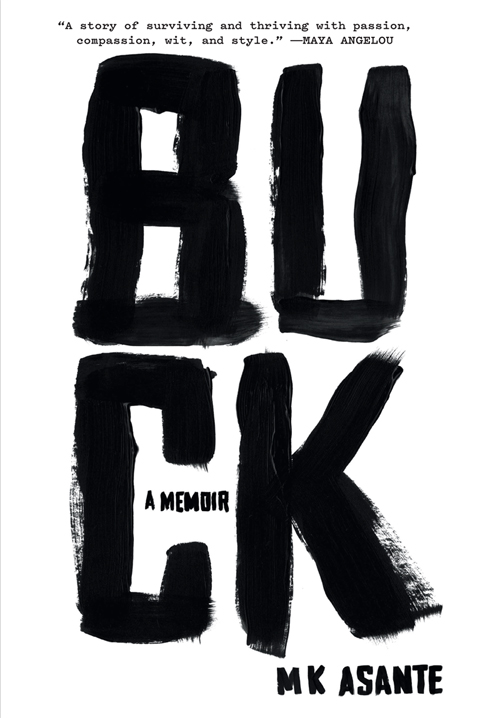
Cover of Buck: A Memoir, published by Random House in 2013

Asante is the author of five books, most notably Buck: A Memoir, a 2013 memoir about his turbulent youth in Philadelphia.

Buck was selected as a Barnes & Noble Discover Great New Writers selection, and was named to The Washington Post's bestseller list in 2014 and 2015. It was included on the In the Margins Book List in 2014. Poet Maya Angelou, who mentored Asante, described Buck as "a story of surviving and thriving with passion, compassion, wit, and style."

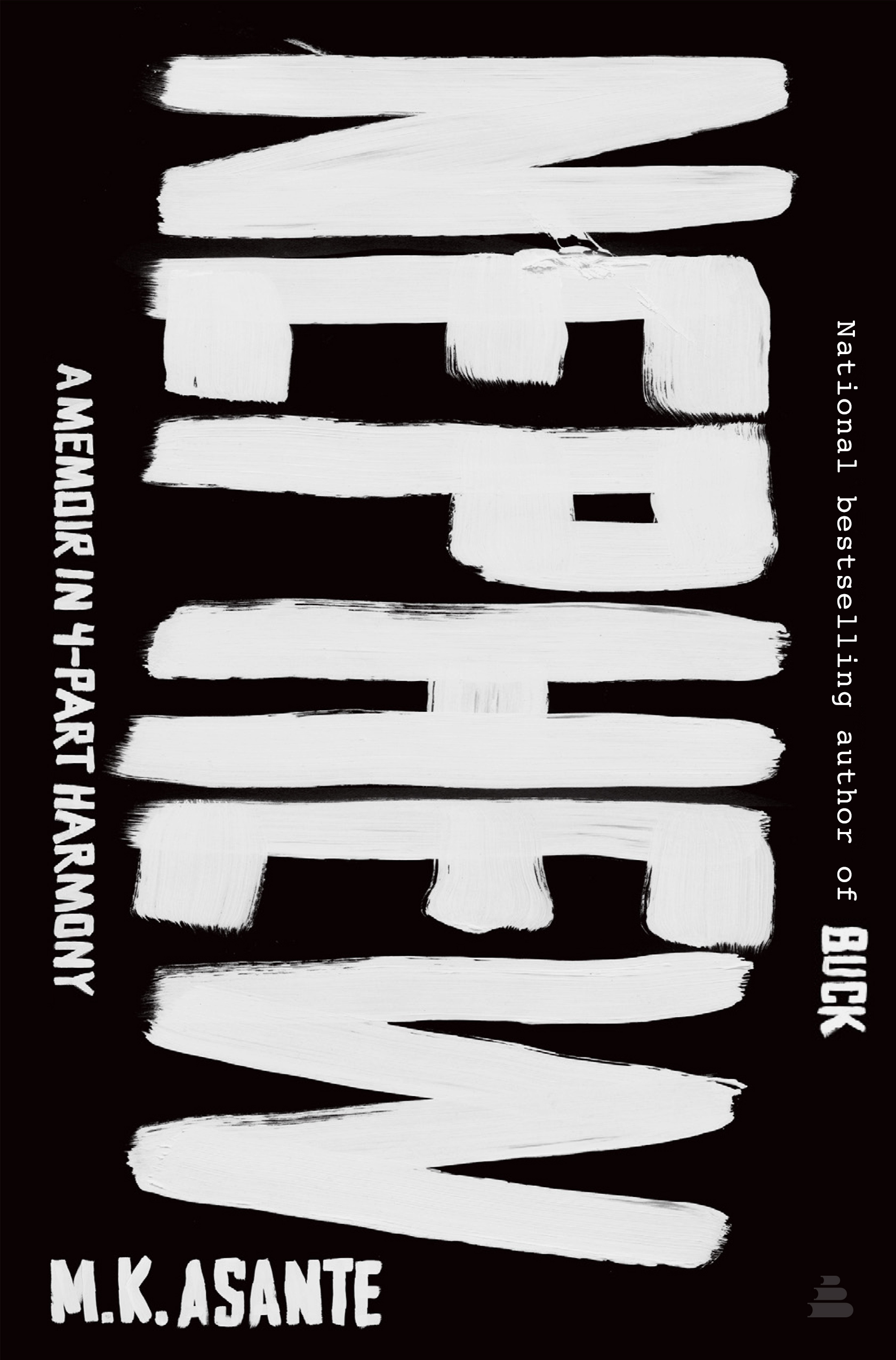
Cover of Nephew: A Memoir in Four-Part Harmony, published by HarperCollins / Amistad Press in 2024

Publishers Weekly announced that Asante's second memoir, Nephew: A Memoir in Four-Part Harmony, would be published by HarperCollins / Amistad Press with an on-sale date of May 21, 2024. Reviewing Nephew, Kirkus Reviews wrote: “This innovative memoir offers provocative commentary on how Black Americans have sung—and might yet sing—their paths to freedom. Passionate, moving, spirited reflections on art’s therapeutic potency.” Library Journal gave Nephew a starred review, stating:

"This poignant memoir about overcoming devastating odds is a treasure and likely to become a classic. Essential reading for deepening understanding of society, the world, familial relationships, and the meaning of art and life."

=== Films ===
Asante is a Sundance Institute Feature Film Fellow for the movie adaptation of his memoir Buck.

He wrote and produced the 2005 documentary 500 Years Later, a documentary about slavery which received the Breaking the Chains Award from UNESCO.

Asante directed and produced The Black Candle (2012), a documentary about Kwanzaa, co-written and narrated by Maya Angelou.

He co-wrote the broadcast opening short films for the 2021 NBA Finals on ABC directed by Spike Lee.

=== Lectures and essays ===
Asante has delivered Distinguished Lectures at Yale University, Vanderbilt University, and Southern Methodist University. He has delivered commencement addresses at UCLA, University of Wisconsin, Arizona State University, Vassar College, Lafayette College, and Harvard University.

He is featured in Changing America: 1968 and Beyond, a permanent exhibit at the Smithsonian's National Museum of African American History and Culture.

He has written essays on art, hip hop, technology, and culture for USA Today, The Huffington Post, San Francisco Chronicle, and The New York Times.

=== Music ===
Asante is featured on the song "Bangers", along with Halo, from the album Indie 500 by Talib Kweli and 9th Wonder. In their review of the album, Pitchfork noted that "Asante captures the vibe nicely."

Asante is the founder of Wonderful Sound Studios.

As a songwriter, he wrote the lyrics for the 2023-'24, 2024-'25, and 2025-'26 official Monday Night Football anthem, "In the Air Tonight", a cover of the song of the same name by Phil Collins, performed by Snoop Dogg, Chris Stapleton, and Cindy Blackman Santana.

== Academia ==
At age 23, Asante joined the faculty of Morgan State University. He received tenure three years later, at age 26. He is currently an associate professor of creative writing and film in the Department of English and Language Arts. In 2017, he was appointed Distinguished Professor-in-Residence at the MICA (Institute of Strategic Marketing and Communication) in India.

He is the recipient of the 2021 Morgan State University Distinguished Achievement Award.

In 2025, he received an Honorary Degree, Doctor of Arts from Lafayette College.

=== TV shows ===
Asante is the host and co-executive producer of While Black with MK Asante, a docuseries produced by Snapchat. The series takes the stories of America's black youth and gives them a platform in the smartphones of millions of America's teens. While Black with MK Asante has nearly 17 million viewers.

=== TV performances ===
On November 30, 2020, Asante performed and debuted "We the Eagles" on ESPN's Monday Night Football for a live audience of 11.4 million viewers.

On May 29, 2021, he performed and debuted "Skate or D.I.E." at the 2021 Dew Tour Skateboarding Olympic qualifier on NBC.

On October 11, 2021, he co-wrote, co-produced, and starred in the introduction to ESPN's Monday Night Football Week 5 game featuring the Indianapolis Colts vs. the Baltimore Ravens. In the introduction, Asante is backed by the Morgan State University Marching Band; the introduction was viewed by 11.4 million viewers.

== Awards and honors ==
- 2002: Jean Corrie Poetry Prize – Academy of American Poets
- 2005: Best Documentary (500 Years Later) – Pan African Film Festival
- 2006: Best Int'l Documentary (500 Years Later) – Harlem Int'l Film Festival
- 2006: Best Documentary (500 Years Later) – Bridgetown Film Festival
- 2007: Breaking the Chains Award (500 Years Later) – United Nations' UNESCO
- 2008: Best Documentary (The Black Candle) – Africa World Documentary Film Festival
- 2009: Langston Hughes Award from the Langston Hughes Society
- 2009: The Key to the City of Dallas, Texas
- 2010: Board of director's Best Documentary (Motherland) – Pan African Film Festival
- 2011: Best Documentary (Motherland) – Zanzibar International Film Festival
- 2012: Best Director (The Black Candle) – Arkansas Black Film Festival
- 2012: Outstanding Young Writer – Middle Atlantic Writers Association
- 2013: Discover Great New Writers (Buck: A Memoir) – Barnes & Noble
- 2013: Best Book of 2013 (Buck: A Memoir) – Baltimore Magazine
- 2013: Inspirational Memoir finalist (Buck: A Memoir) – Books for a Better Life Award
- 2014: Washington Post Bestseller List – Paperback Nonfiction #6 (Buck: A Memoir)
- 2014: Alex Award finalist (Buck: A Memoir) – American Library Association
- 2014: TheGrio 100 List – MSNBC The Grio
- 2014: Feature Film Program Fellow – Sundance Institute
- 2014: Outstanding Literary Work – Autobiography finalist (Buck: A Memoir) – NAACP Image Awards
- 2014: In the Margins Book Award (Buck: A Memoir)
- 2015: Washington Post Bestseller List – Paperback Nonfiction #3 (Buck: A Memoir)
- 2016: Chancellor's Medallion – Fayetteville State University
- 2017: Distinguished Professor-in-Residence – MICA (Institute of Strategic Marketing and Communication)
- 2018: Great Stories Club – American Library Association (Buck: A Memoir)
- 2019: Lifetime Achievement Award – Muslim-Christian Alliance of Philadelphia
- 2020: Best in Social Activism (Finalist) – Shorty Awards (While Black with MK Asante)
- 2020: Short Form Series (Nomination) Critics' Choice Real TV Awards (While Black with MK Asante)
- 2021: Presidential Citation – MSU Distinguished Achievement Award – Morgan State University
- 2024: Sports EMMY for Outstanding Opening/Tease – "In the Air" Monday Night Football – Sports Emmy Awards - National Academy of Television Arts and Sciences
- 2024: Earphones Award - AudioFile (Nephew: A Memoir in Four-Part Harmony)
- 2024: Outstanding Audiobook Narration - American Library Association (Nephew: A Memoir in Four-Part Harmony)
- 2025: In the Margins Book Award for Nonfiction (Nephew: A Memoir in Four-Part Harmony) - in the Margins Award
- 2025: Honorary Degree, Doctor of Arts – Lafayette College, 2025.

== Books ==
- Like Water Running Off My Back (Africa World Press, 2002)
- Beautiful. And Ugly Too (Africa World Press, 2005)
- It's Bigger Than Hip Hop (St. Martin's Press, 2008)
- Buck: A Memoir (Spiegel & Grau / Penguin Random House, 2013)
- Nephew: A Memoir in Four-Part Harmony (Amistad / HarperCollins, 2024)

== Films ==
- 500 Years Later (2005)
- The Black Candle (2008)
- Buck (in development)

== TV shows ==
- While Black with MK Asante (2019–2021) (Snapchat/NBCUniversal)
- Free Tuition with MK Asante (2020–2021) (Snapchat/Future plc)
- Paid in Full (2024)(Canadian Broadcasting Company/British Broadcasting Company)

== Music ==
=== Songwriter ===
- 2025-2026: "In the Air Tonight" – Snoop Dogg, Chris Stapleton, Cindy Blackman Santana (produced by Dave Cobb) (written by Phil Collins and M. K. Asante)
- 2024-2025: "In the Air Tonight" – Snoop Dogg, Chris Stapleton, Cindy Blackman Santana (produced by Dave Cobb) (written by Phil Collins and M. K. Asante)
- 2023-2024: "In the Air Tonight" – Snoop Dogg, Chris Stapleton, Cindy Blackman Santana (produced by Dave Cobb) (written by Phil Collins and M. K. Asante)

=== Albums ===
- 2015: Buck: Original Book Soundtrack by M. K. Asante

=== Singles ===
- 2013: "The Color Grey" – Bishop Lamont ft. Mykisha Thomas and M. K. Asante (produced by Chris Noxx)
- 2014: "My Victory" – M. K. Asante ft. Maya Angelou (produced by J Dilla)
- 2014: "The Bulletin" – M. K. Asante ft. Uzi (produced by Faze Miyake)
- 2015: "Young Bucks" – M. K. Asante ft. Mez (produced by J-Mac and Commissioner Gordon)
- 2020: "We the Eagles" – M. K. Asante (produced by Mez)
- 2021: "Skate or D.I.E." – M. K. Asante (produced by The Brightness)

=== Features ===
- 2013: "Godz N The Hood" – Ras Kass ft. Bishop Lamont, M. K. Asante and Talib Kweli (produced by Chris Noxx)
- 2015: "Rap Psalms" – M. K. Asante ft. Narcy (produced by Thanks Joey)
- 2015: "Bangers" – M. K. Asante and Halo (produced by Nottz)
- 2016: "Runnin" – Ace Clark ft. M. K. Asante (produced by Scarecrow Beats)
