= African-American book publishers in the United States, 1960–80 =

While African-American book publishers have been active in the United States since the second decade of the 19th century, the 1960s and 1970s saw a proliferation of publishing activity, with the establishment of many new publishing houses, an increase in the number of titles published, and significant growth in the number of African-American bookstores. African-American commercial book publishers released a total of 154 titles in the period 1970–74, a dramatic rise from the previous high of 21 titles published during the five-year spans of 1935–39 and 1940–44. Institutional and religious publishers also increased their title output, rising from 51 titles in the years 1960–64 to 240 titles in 1970–74. Concomitantly, there was a widening in the scope of publishing objectives on the part of African-American book publishers, who began to release titles that not only advanced their particular ideologies but dealt with topics unrelated to Black Americana or Africana. Such diversity is emblematic of the increasingly important role in American culture and society of African-American book publishers.

== General ==
Many factors, including the rising literacy rate among African Americans and the greater numbers of African Americans enrolled in institutions of higher learning, created an increased demand for books and thus contributed to this surge in publishing activity. By 1969, only 3.6% of African Americans were reported illiterate, and by 1970, 357,000 African Americans were attending a college or university. The 1960s and 1970s also saw increasing levels of professional employment and economic prosperity, and witnessed a growing consciousness of African-American history and culture. As well, a series of legislative acts at the federal level, including the Library Services Act (1956), the Library Services and Construction Act (1963), and the Elementary and Secondary School Act (1965), led to greater investment by the U.S. Government in education and libraries. Occurring alongside these educational and economic gains were the political advances ushered in by the civil rights movement: the 1964 Civil Rights Act, which officially prohibited much overt discrimination and abolished legal segregation in employment, schools, federally-assisted programs, and public accommodations; the 1965 Voting Rights Act; and the 1968 Civil Rights Act, which outlawed housing discrimination.

Spurred on by the social and cultural advances of the late-1950s and 1960s, and an increased demand for books by and about African-Americans, the period 1960–80 saw the largest increase in new African-American book publishers in the 20th century. The number of titles released by African-American book publishers rose dramatically, and these works addressed an increasingly diverse range of subjects. The significance of their role as intermediaries in the circulation of ideas within society was of primary importance to many African-American book publishers, and the intellectual and literary products which they fostered were integral to American culture.

Taken together, these political, economic, and educational advances created opportunities for a growing number of African Americans to engage in book publishing, an enterprise of great cultural import. Books are a primary medium for the transmission of ideas, and thus book publishers can be seen as serving as crucial intermediaries between the authors whose works they publish and the society in which such works, and the ideas they contain, circulate.

== Commercial publishing ==
Given that most African-American book publishers were small in size, and faced considerable difficulties in raising capital, acquiring the experience and expertise necessary to engage in publishing, and having their books reviewed by the relevant media outlets, the cultural significance of their endeavors was decisive. Many African-American commercial book publishers "did not enter book publishing with the expectation of making a profit, but rather to publish books documenting and portraying the Black American and African experience and to open publishing opportunities for Black writers".

Broadside Press, founded by poet and librarian Dudley Randall in Detroit in 1965, is an excellent example of this tendency to focus on the cultural and social importance of book publishing. As Randall states: "My strongest motivations have been to get good black poets published, to produce beautiful books, help create and define the soul of black folks, and to know the joy of discovering new poets." Specializing in the work of African-American poets, Broadside Press had "a profound influence on the development of American literature in the 1960s and 1970s". Its publications were characterized by an artistic sensibility. and were circulated nationally and internationally. Poem, Counterpoem, by Randall and Margaret Danner, released in 1966, was the first title by Broadside Press, and between 1966 and 1976 approximately 40 titles were published. Among these were works by a wide range of poets, including Nikki Giovanni, the Pulitzer Prize-winner Gwendolyn Brooks, Sonia Sanchez, Margaret Danner, Etheridge Knight, Don L. Lee (Haki Madhubuti), James Ryder Randall, and Addison Gayle. Despite the quality of the books and authors published, "persistent financial difficulties plagued Broadside Press and constituted real problems".

Troubles of this sort were common to many African-American book publishers operating in the commercial sector, and in certain instances led to their demise. Path Press, Inc. was formed in 1961 in Chicago by Frank London Brown, Herman C. Gilbert and Bennett Johnson, but due to their inability to find a distributor the company did not release its first book until 1969.

Other publishers include Black Academy Press, Inc., founded by Sebastian Okechukwu Mezu in Buffalo, New York, in 1969. For Mezu, book publishing was not only a cultural endeavor but an assertion of his individual rights, as he made clear at an opening ceremony for the Press in 1970: "Here today in Buffalo ... is being constituted Black Academy Press, Inc. as the black intellectual seeks to reclaim his rights in a multiracial society and affirm his responsibility to his people in our complex pluriverse". Black Academy Press relocated in the 1990s to Baltimore, Maryland, and to date continues to publish numerous books, journals, and articles.

The struggle to obtain the funding necessary to run a publishing house was not always insurmountable. The Third Press / Joseph Okpaku Publishing Company, Inc., founded by Nigerian-born Joseph Okpaku in New York in 1970, was able to overcome its early financial difficulties and, by the mid-1970s, had become the most prolific African-American-owned commercial book publisher in the United States. The goal of the Third Press, as Okpaku saw it, was "to broaden the scope and perspective of the reading public beyond the present narrow ethnocentric limits of the more conventional establishment publishers" (Chambers, 1971, 43). He also sought to internationalize the Third Press, engaging in co-publishing efforts with the Centre of Black and African Arts and Civilization in Lagos, Nigeria. Okpaku’s successes were apparently short-lived, as the Third Press, for reasons unknown, ceased publishing activities in 1986.

Third World Press, founded in 1967 by Haki R. Madhubuti, Black Classic Press, founded in 1978 by W. Paul Coates, are two of the oldest independently owned Black publishers still in operation.

== Non-commercial publishing ==
For African-American book publishers operating outside the commercial sector—that is, institutional and religious publishers—the ability to rely on an existing organization for resources and funding was of crucial importance. Such backing did not remove the risk involved, however, as Charles F. Harris, the first executive director of Howard University Press, noted: "... it's always a bad time to start a university press. It's a marginal business for people who like to take a lot of chances." Although books bearing its imprint had appeared as early as 1919, Howard University Press was not actually established as a separate administrative unit with a professional staff until 1972, when it became the first African-American university press in the United States. Its initial list of books appeared in 1974, and contained 13 titles in history, biography, literature, and education.

The well-established publishing operations of civil rights organizations, such as the National Association for the Advancement of Colored People, and the National Urban League, continued to be productive in the years 1960-80; joining them in their efforts were newly formed African-American institutional book publishers, including the DuSable Museum of African American History, Inc. Founded in Chicago in 1961 by educator, poet, and artist Margaret Goss Burroughs, the DuSable Museum of African American History, Inc., was the first institution of its kind to be established in the United States. Its book publishing activities began in 1963, and while of a relatively modest nature — by 1977 fewer than 20 titles had been released — its contributions have been valuable, with publications exploring "uncharted areas in black history and culture".

A number of African-American religious book publishers were active in the period 1960–80, notable among them the Sunday School Publishing Board of the National Baptist Convention, USA, Inc. (SSPB), which was founded in Nashville, Tennessee, in 1916. In 1967, the SSPB established a general trade book unit, Townsend Press, to publish secular titles. By 1990, the SSPB had become the largest African-American-owned religious publisher in the world.

== Publishers ==
Listed below are African-American book publishers active in the United States during the period 1960–80, their location, date of founding (and demise, if applicable), and selected publications. The publishers are divided into three categories: commercial, religious, or institutional. This last category includes cultural organizations, civil rights organizations, and college and university presses. Entries within each category are arranged alphabetically. The information regarding these publishers is mostly drawn from two works by Donald Franklin Joyce: Black Book Publishers in the United States: A Historical Dictionary of the Presses, 1817–1990 (1991); and Gatekeepers of Black Culture: Black-Owned Book Publishing in the United States, 1817–1981 (1983).

=== Commercial book publishers ===
- Afro-Am Publishing Company, Inc. (Chicago, 1963; ceased publishing in 1978).
- Agascha Productions (Detroit, 1970; ceased publishing in the early 1980s).

—Agadem and Schiavi Diara, Hey, Let a Revolutionary Brother and Sister Come In (1970); Richard E. Bibbins, Bridge from Hell (1972); Ulysses Marshall, Thoughts from the Asylum (1974); Freddie Robinson, Solo in Black (1974).

- Balamp Publishing (Detroit, 1970).
- Black Academy Press (Buffalo, New York, 1970–73; Bloomfield, New Jersey, 1973–75; ceased publishing in 1975).

—Sebastian Okechukwu Mezu and Ram Dasai, eds, Black Leaders of the Centuries (1970); Amechi Anumonye, African Students in Alien Cultures (1970); John Indakwa, Swahili Conversation and Grammar (1972); Felix N. Okoye, The American Image of Africa: Myth and Reality (1971).

- Black Classic Press (Baltimore, Maryland; 1978).
- Broadside Press (Detroit, 1965).

—Nikki Giovanni, Black Judgment (1968); Etheridge Knight, Poems from Prison (1969); Dudley Randall and Margaret Burroughs, eds, For Malcolm: Poems on the Life and Death of Malcolm X (1969); Sonia Sanchez, We a BADD People (1970); Gwendolyn Brooks, Riot (1970); Sam Greenlee, Blues for an African Princess (1971); Addison Gayle, Claude McKay: The Black Poet at War (1972); Haki Madhubuti, Book of Life (1974).

- Drum and Spear Press (Washington, D.C., 1969; ceased publishing in 1970).

—C. L. R. James, A History of Pan-African Revolt (1969); Chief Ofuntoki, The Book of African Names (1970).

- Emerson Hall Publishers (New York, 1971; ceased publishing in the early 1980s).

—Rebecca Barton, Race in Literature and Society (1972); Robert B. Hill, Strength of Black Families (1972); E. Fuller Torrey, The Mind Game: Witchdoctors and Psychiatrists (1972); June Jordan, New Days: Poems of Exile and Return (1973); Alvin Poussaint, Why Blacks Kill Blacks (1973).

- Energy Black South Press (Washington, D.C., 1972).
- Johnson Publishing Company Book Division (Chicago, 1962).

—Lerone Bennett, Jr., Before the Mayflower: A History of the Negro In America, 1619–1962 (1962); Mary Jordan and Leslie Wishart, The Integrated Cookbook (1972); Dorothy Robinson, The Legend of Africana (1974); Shirley Graham DuBois, DuBois: A Pictorial Biography (1978).

- Lotus Press (Detroit, 1972). Established by Naomi Long Madgett, merged with Broadside Press in 2015, forming the new Broadside Lotus Press.
- Path Press (Chicago, 1961; joined Third World Press in 1972; began publishing again in 2014).
- J.A. Rogers Publications (Chicago, 1921; ceased publishing in 1966).
- Sapphire Publishing Company (San Francisco, 1973).
- Tarharka Publishing Company (Annapolis, Maryland, 1971).
- Third Press, Joseph Okpaku Publishing Company Inc. (New York, 1970; ceased publishing in 1986).

—Joseph Okpaku, Verdict: The Exclusive Picture Story of the Trial of the Chicago 8 (1970); Angela Davis, If They Come in the Morning (1971); Chinua Achebe and John Iroganachi, How the Leopard got His Claws (1973); Arthur Pest, Illustrated History of the Nigerian People (1973); Lizbeth Gant, Annotated Bibliography of Black American Literature (1980);

- Third World Press (Chicago, 1967).

—Carolyn Rodgers, Songs of a Blackbird (1969); Shawna Madlangbayan, Garvey, Lumumba, and Malcolm: Black Nationalist-Separatist (1973); Chancellor Williams, The Destruction of Black Civilization (1974); Gwendolyn Brooks, The Tiger Who Wore White Gloves; or What You Are (1974); Eugene Perkins, Home is a Dirty Street: The Social Oppression of Black Children (1976).

- Vita Ya Wuta Publishers (Newark, New Jersey, 1967).
- Winston-Derek Publishers, Inc. (Nashville, Tennessee, 1972).
- Cecil Williams Photography/Publishing: Orangeburg, South Carolina, 1989; publisher of 105 small-volume books.

=== Institutional book publishers ===
- Alkebu-Lan Books Association of the Alkebu-Lan Foundation (Baltimore, Maryland, 1970).
- Associated Publishers (Washington, D.C., 1921).

—Wesley Charles, Neglected History: Essays in Negro American History by a College President (1969); Wesley Charles, The Fifteenth Amendment and Black America, 1870-1970 (1970).

- Blyden Publishing Company (New York, 1967).
- Buckingham Learning Corporation (New York, 1968; ceased publishing in 1973?).
- DuSable Museum of African American History, Inc. (Chicago, 1961).

—Eugene Feldman, ed., Figures in Negro History (1965); Margaret Burroughs, What Shall I Tell My Children Who Are Black (1968); Milton Glaseve, No Man Born of a Black Woman (1977).

- The East (Brooklyn, New York, 1970).

—Herman B. Ferguson, Dope: An Agent of Chemical Warfare (1972); Yusef Kman, ed., The Young Black Poets of Brooklyn (1973).

- Free Lance Press (Cleveland, Ohio, 1950; ceased publishing in 1980).

—Conrad Kent Rivers, These Black Bodies and This Sunburnt Face (1962); D. A. Levy, North American Book of the Dead (1965); Russell Atkins, The Mantu Poets of Cleveland (1970); Russell Atkins, Maleficium (1971).

- Howard University Press (Washington, D.C., 1972).

—Lindsay Barrett, Song for Mumu (1974); Arthur P. Davis, From the Dark Tower: Afro-American Writers, 1900-1960 (1974); Walter Rodney, How Europe Underdeveloped Africa (1974); William F. Brazziel, Quality Education for All Americans (1974); Robert Allen, Reluctant Reformers (1974); Foster Kidd, ed., Profile of the Negro in Dentistry (1980).

- National Association for the Advancement of Colored People (New York, 1910).
- National Urban League (New York, 1911).

—Where the Lender Looks First: A Case Study of Mortgage Disinvestment in Bronx County (1970); When the Marching Stopped: An Analysis of Black Issues in the 1970s (1973); The Power of the Ballot: A Handbook for Black Political Participation (1973).

- Nuclassics and Science Publishing Company (Washington, D.C., 1969).

=== Religious book publishers ===
- The American Methodist Episcopal Sunday School Union and Publishing House (Nashville, Tennessee, 1886).
- American Methodist Episcopal Zion Publishing House (Charlotte, North Carolina, 1894).

—William J. Walls, The African Methodist Episcopal Zion Church: Reality of the Black Church (1974).

- The Christian Methodist Episcopal Publishing House (Jackson, Tennessee, 1870–1972; Memphis, Tennessee, 1972).

—H. C. Bunton, The Challenge to Become Involved (1967); Caesar D. Coleman, ed., Beyond Blackness to Destiny (1969); M. C. Pettigrew, From Miles to Johnson: One Hundred Years (1970).

- Church of God in Christ Publishing House (Memphis, Tennessee, 1907).
- Muhammad’s Temple No. 2, Publications Department (Chicago, 1956).

—Christine Johnson, Muhammad’s Children: A First Grade Reader (1963); Elijah Muhammad, Message to the Black Man in America (1967); Elijah Muhammad, The Fall of America (1974).

- National Baptist Publishing Board (Nashville, Tennessee, 1896).
- Sunday School Publishing Board of the National Baptist Convention, USA, Inc. (Nashville, Tennessee, 1916).

—Joseph H. Jackson, Unholy Shadows and Freedom’s Holy Light (1967); Alice H. Mitchell, Emergency Addresses and Poems (1974).

- R. H. Boyd Publishing Corporation (Nashville, Tennessee, 1895).

—Emma J. Wisdom, Dreammaker (2006)

== See also ==
- Books in the United States

== Sources ==
- Boyd, Melba Joyce. Wrestling with the Muse: Dudley Randall and the Broadside Press. New York: Columbia University Press, 2003.
- Chambers, Bradford. "Why Minority Publishing?" Publishers Weekly. Vol. 199, No. 11, March 15, 1971. 35–50.
- Joyce, Donald Franklin. Black Book Publishers in the United States: A Historical Dictionary of the Presses, 1817–1990. New York: Greenwood Press, 1991.
- Joyce, Donald Franklin. Gatekeepers of Black Culture: Black-Owned Book Publishing in The United States, 1817–1981. Westport, CT: Greenwood Press, 1983.
- Nishikawa, Kinohi. "Publishers and Publishing." The Greenwood Encyclopedia of African American Literature. Hans Ostrom and J. David Macey, Jr (eds). Westport, CT: Greenwood Press, 2005. 1331–36.
- Wagner, Susan. "Howard University Launches Its Own Press". Publishers Weekly. Vol. 205, No. 9, March 4, 1974. 48–50.
