= Marcus Bruce Christian =

American poet (1900–1976)

Marcus Bruce Christian (March 8, 1900 – November 21, 1976), was a New Negro regional poet, writer, historian and folklorist. The author of the collection, I Am New Orleans and Other Poems (posthumously edited by Rudolph Lewis and Amin Sharif and published by Xavier Review Press), Christian also compiled and wrote the still-unpublished manuscript, The History of The Negro in Louisiana during his stint at the Negro Federal Writers' Project at Dillard University. After his death, his family bequeathed 256 cubic feet (7.2 m^{3}) of his diaries, criticism, manuscripts, and scholarly papers to the University of New Orleans, where they currently reside.

== Biography ==
=== Early life ===
Christian was born in Mechanicsville, Terrebonne Parish, a rural town seventy to eighty miles south of New Orleans, now known as part of Houma, Louisiana. He was the son of Emmanuel Banks Christian, Sr. and Rebecca Harris Christian. Both parents may have shared Creole ancestry. While not a family of means, the Christians were considered middle class. His paternal grandfather Ebel was a schoolteacher who rose to become superintendent of the segregated Lafourche Parish schools. Emmanuel Sr. was a Knights of Labor union organizer among the sugar cane workers as well as a schoolteacher at Houma Academy; his son also came to matriculate at the same school.

Christian's boyhood, however, was marked by tragedy. His mother died when Marcus was three, his twin sister when he was seven, and his father when Christian was thirteen. Nominally head of the family, he and the surviving Christian children were farmed out to live with relatives in the countryside. In 1917, Christian moved to New Orleans, and quickly landed a job as a chauffeur; in 1919 he brought his siblings there to live as a family once more. He was among the throng of blacks who left their agrarian existence to find a new and better life in urban cities like New Orleans in the decades immediately before, during and after World War I.

Emmanuel Christian, however, had managed to instill in his son a love for literature, particularly for the works of Whittier, Longfellow and Alfred, Lord Tennyson. Thus, Marcus Christian became an autodidact; he completed his high school education through night school courses, but college was unattainable. Moreover, he was responsible for his brothers and sisters, said one biographer, to the point of self-sacrifice, even after they matured. By 1926, the young man managed to set up a small dry cleaning business, the Bluebird Cleaners, where his siblings also worked from time to time. The Bluebird, however, folded in 1936 amid the Great Depression. Proud and independent, Christian refused to sign up for relief. The failure of his business was only one of several financial reverses Christian was to suffer throughout his lifetime.

=== "Poet Laureate of New Orleans Negroes" ===
Christian's first poem, "M-O-D-O-C-S of '22" is described as his valedictory address to his night school class. He tried without success to self-publish his first collection Ethiopia Triumphant and Other Poems; disappointed at the results, he later bought his own printing press, and published his own chapbooks. Christian's writing came to public notice when he began contributing to the Louisiana Weekly, a New Orleans black newspaper, as a poetry editor and writer. By 1932, Christian was corresponding with Arna Bontemps, also a native Louisiana writer, and Langston Hughes, who commented favorably on his contribution to the Crisis, then the literary as well as the political organ of the National Association for the Advancement of Colored People (NAACP). His poem, "McDonough Day in New Orleans" broke into the mainstream, appearing in the New York Herald Tribune in 1934. He began a second manuscript partly based on his experiences at the Bluebird: The Clothes Doctor and Other Poems. He also published numerous poems and essays in other African American newspapers and magazines—like Phylon, Opportunity: A Journal of Negro Life, and the Pittsburgh Courier—across the country. Columnist Mel Washburn of the New Orleans Item-Tribune soon called him, "the poet laureate of New Orleans Negroes."

In all, Christian composed some 2,000 poems over the course of his life. In contrast to the modern or free-verse poems his better-known contemporaries favored, Christian's poems often took the form of the 19th century English lyric poem. For later generations, particular those of the Sixties and Seventies, Christian's choice of form proved problematic, if not incorrect; not only to these radicalized black writers, but to newer critics like Henry Louis Gates and Arthur P. Davis, who in the opinion of Christian's supporters tend to overlook or to short-change his work.

=== The Negro Writers' Project ===
In 1936, with the help of his patron Lyle Saxon, a well-known Louisiana writer, Christian was appointed to a special Negro unit of the Federal Writers' Project located at Dillard University. The Louisiana Negro Writers' Project (one of several with a preponderance of African Americans) was created for black intellectuals, writers and artists under the Works Project Administration (WPA) to write about African American history, culture and folklore specific and peculiar to their states or regions. The first director was Lawrence Reddick, a professor of history at Dillard, and eventually Christian succeeded Reddick as director in the Project's remaining years.

Violet Harrington Bryan in her study, The Myth of New Orleans in Literature, wrote that members of the Louisiana Negro Writers' Project comprised "a Who's Who of Negro intellectuals" of the time, like artist Elizabeth Catlett, sociologist St. Clair Drake, writer Arna Bontemps, and poet Margaret Walker, with writer Frank Yerby, also a professor at Dillard, rounding out the group.

Christian did extensive research on the black and alternative history of Louisiana.

During this productive period, Christian edited a book of poetry, From the Deep South in 1937, and was featured in Sterling Brown's The Negro Caravan and Arna Bontemps' The Poetry of the Negro.

=== Later life ===
Christian's fortunes rose and fell after World War II began. He received a year-long Rosenwald Fellowship to continue his research after the Project was shuttered in 1943. He also made up his mind to marry Dillard co-ed Ruth Morand after dividing his affections between her and Irene Douglas, a New York sketch artist who may or may not have been passing for white. It didn't take long to Christian realize his mistake: Ruth wanted a breadwinner who could command the kind of salary and overtime that many blacks were making in the war industries. Furthermore, she was not willing to share in his artistic vision or his sacrifices. Both women, however, were at least twenty years younger than the poet.

Eventually, Ruth left Christian and relocated to Chicago. One of her letters boasted she was making twice as much money than the poet had received with his fellowship. Both complained of each other's infidelity, either real or imagined: he with the unattainable Irene, she with new friends found while living in Chicago. After several attempts at reconciliation, the couple finally divorced sometime in the 1950s. They had no children.

In 1944, Christian became an assistant librarian at the Dillard University library. He might have achieved lifelong financial stability at this post had not another member of the staff objected to his continuing employment without a college degree six years later. After his abrupt and painful termination, coupled with the failure of his marriage, the poet became a complete recluse and sank into what one biographer called "abysmal poverty." At one point, he was reduced to being a paper boy. He tried to maintain his collection in his Ninth Ward home, especially in the face of flooding caused by Hurricane Betsy in 1965, but he was arrested as a looter while wading in the rising, dirty waters, trying to save his papers.

Possibly because of this incident, new attention was focused on Christian, and his last years were kinder to him. He received a bronze medal from the Sesquicentennial (150th anniversary) Commission of the Battle of New Orleans in 1965. In 1969, Christian became poetry writer-in-residence and taught history at the University of New Orleans. His poem, I Am New Orleans was published on the front page of the New Orleans Times-Picayune in 1968. From his archives, he produced the book, Negro Ironworkers of Louisiana, 1718-1900, which is still in print.

Christian may have worn a suit jacket with mismatched pants, as a former student related, but he was always on time for class. It was fitting that, in a University of New Orleans classroom, lecturing on what he loved best, Christian collapsed and was brought to Charity Hospital, where he died a few days later at the age of 76.
