= The Employment of Negro Troops =

U.S. WWII history book

- Title page for The Employment of Negro Troops (1966)
- Author: Ulysses Lee
- Published: 1966

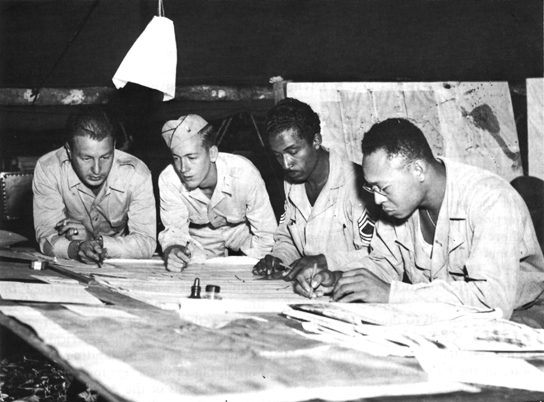
"24th Infantrymen plotting defensive positions" during the Bougainville counterattack, March 1944, photograph published on page 503 of The Employment of Negro Troops

The Employment of Negro Troops is a book by Ulysses Lee about the service of African Americans in World War II. Lee wrote his 1953 dissertation at the University of Chicago on the subject. His book on the subject by the same title was published in 1966 by the Office of the Chief of Military History in Washington D.C. in 1966. Lee served in the U.S. Army attaining the rank of Major and served as a military historian.

The War Department delayed publication of the book. The Employment of Negro Troops was largely written between 1947 and 1951 but not published (in somewhat altered/edited form) until a decade later. Robert R. Kirsch, the Los Angeles Times book editor, called it "incisive and penetrating...takes up the hard questions and does not compromise on the answers."

The University Press of the Pacific republished the book in 2004 calling it a landmark study.

== See also ==
- A History of the Negro Troops in the War of the Rebellion, 1861–1865
