= Ulysses Lee =

African-American soldier and writer (1913–1969)

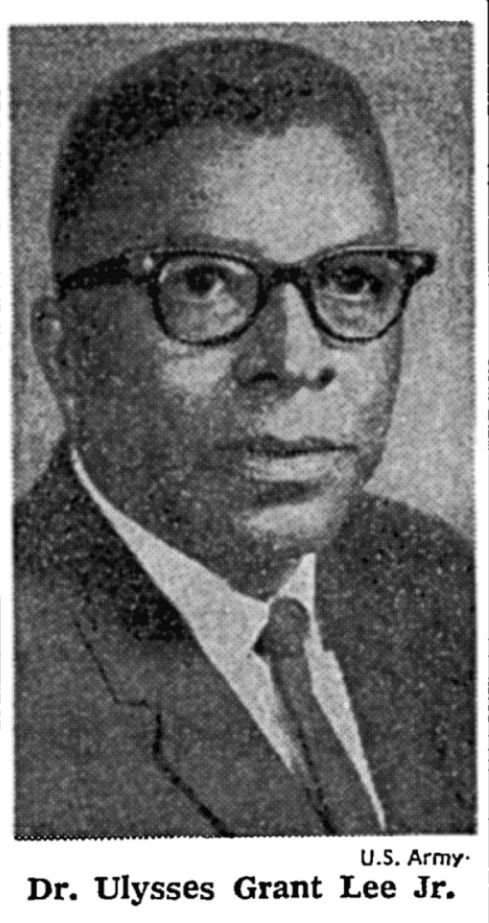
- Born: December 4, 1913; Washington, D.C.
- Died: January 7, 1969 (aged 55); Baltimore, Maryland
- Occupations: Academic, soldier, author, editor
- Years active: 1936–1969
- Notable work: The Employment of Negro Troops, The Negro Caravan, The Negro in Virginia, Leadership and the Negro Soldier, City and Capital

Major Ulysses Grant Lee Jr., Ph.D. (December 4, 1913 – January 7, 1969) was a U.S. soldier, scholar, professor, writer, editor and American military historian. He contributed to the Federal Writers' Project, co-edited The Negro Caravan with Sterling Brown and Arthur P. Davis, and wrote the official U.S. military history of African-American service in World War II, The Employment of Negro Troops, published in 1963 (Note: Usually dated to 1966, the copyright page of the edition on the U.S. Army website states "first published 1963 CMH Pub 11-4-1.") by the United States Army Center of Military History. In addition his own service, Lee was connected to the military history of African Americans through his grandfather, who served in the U.S. Colored Troops, and his father, a Buffalo Soldier.

== Life and work ==
Lee was a graduate of the notable majority-black Dunbar High School in Washington, D.C. He was awarded a bachelor's degree and a master's degree by Howard University, where he was also named a university fellow. At Howard he was a founding member of the short-lived Gamma Tau fraternity that was organized as an alternative to the extant system. He taught at Lincoln University in Pennsylvania from 1936 to 1943. In 1940 he was awarded a Rosenwald Fellowship toward creating a book on the anti-slavery press in the U.S. while studying at the University of Chicago. During this period Lee served as a contributor or editor on several notable literature projects (usually with a focus on "Negro history and culture") including The Negro Caravan and the Federal Writers' Project. Lee's FWP work included contributions to the American Guide Series book City and Capital (1937) and The Negro in Virginia (1940). The Negro in Virginia is considered the most successful of the FWP's African-American history publications, it was said to have attained "the vibrancy of literature." He also published book reviews, such as a commentary on J. Winston Coleman's Slavery Times in Kentucky, which he acknowledged as valuable while simultaneously identifying cases of paternalistic condescension in the text.

Lee, along with Sterling Brown and Arthur P. Davis, was a co-editor of Caravan, a pioneering anthology of African-American literature first published in 1942. One reviewer, Harvey Curtis Webster, wrote of the book, "The pleasure of reading The Negro Caravan is hardly undermined by the fact that one emerges a more enlightened human being." In her newspaper column My Day, Eleanor Roosevelt wrote that The Negro Caravan "should be in everyone's library."

Having been in ROTC at Howard, Lee was initially commissioned a first lieutenant with the Tuskegee Airmen. He was the author-editor of the Army Service Forces manual, Leadership and the Negro Soldier, published in 1944. He served with the office of the Chief of Military History from 1946 to 1952, retiring as a major after 10 years of active duty. (Note: President Truman's Executive Order 9981 desegregating the U.S. military was issued in 1948; the last segregated unit was not disbanded until 1954.) The Employment of Negro Troops was largely written between 1947 and 1951 but not published (in somewhat altered/edited form) until a decade later. Robert R. Kirsch, the Los Angeles Times book editor, called it "incisive and penetrating...takes up the hard questions and does not compromise on the answers."

After World War II he earned his doctorate Phi Beta Kappa at the University of Chicago. He taught at Lincoln University in Missouri from 1953 to 1956. In 1956 he joined the faculty of Morgan State College as a professor of English. In 1963 he was the inaugural winner of the Morgan State University Distinguished Teacher of the Year award. At the time of his death he was also a professor of American civilization at Penn State through a cooperative program with Morgan State and was the editor-designate of the Journal of Negro History. In the year prior to his sudden death from a heart attack at age 56 he was studying the socioeconomically—and thus racially—disproportionate impacts of Vietnam War-era military draft system.

Dr. Lee's funeral was at the Washington National Cathedral in Washington, D.C. Sterling Brown of Howard University gave the eulogy. Dr. Lee is buried at Lincoln Memorial Cemetery in Suitland, Maryland.

== Personal ==
Lee, the oldest child of seven children, came from a military family. His grandfather served in the Union Army. His father (February 12, 1864 – April 23, 1937) was born in Washington, D.C. and was a "cavalryman at Indian Country posts and then in the Philippines." Ulysses Grant Lee Sr. served a five-year stint with Company I of the 25th Infantry Regiment (enlisted August 5, 1886, discharged August 4, 1891). At the time of the 1920 census Ulysses Lee Sr. was working as a dry-goods merchant. He was buried in plot 91 C 3 at Los Angeles National Cemetery.
