= Lindsay Barrett =

Jamaican-born poet, novelist, essayist and journalist (born 1941)

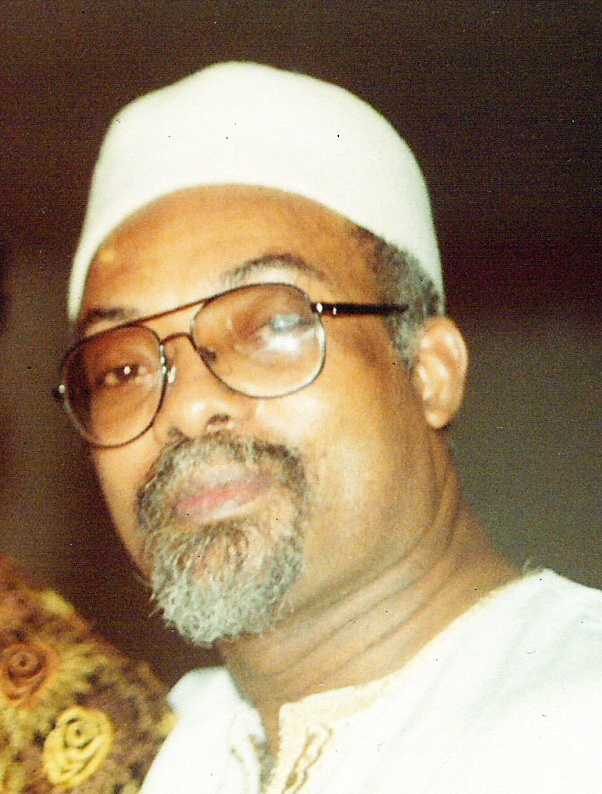
- Barrett in 1983
- Born: Carlton Lindsay Barrett; 15 September 1941 (age 85); Lucea, Jamaica
- Other name: Eseoghene
- Education: Clarendon College (Jamaica)
- Occupations: Novelist, poet, playwright, journalist, broadcaster, photographer
- Notable work: Song for Mumu (1967)
- Relatives: A. Igoni Barrett (son)
- Awards: Conrad Kent Rivers Memorial Award

Carlton Lindsay Barrett (born 15 September 1941), also known as Eseoghene, is a Jamaican-born poet, novelist, essayist, playwright, journalist and photographer, whose work has interacted with the Caribbean Artists Movement in the UK, the Black Arts Movement in the US, and pan-Africanism in general. Leaving Jamaica in the early 1960s, he moved to Britain, where he freelanced as a broadcaster and journalist, also travelling and living elsewhere in Europe, before deciding to relocate to West Africa. Since the latter 1960s he has been based mainly in Nigeria, of which country he became a citizen in the mid-1980s, while continuing his connection to cultural ventures in the UK and US.

Barrett initially drew critical attention for his debut novel, Song for Mumu, which on its London publication in 1967 was favourably noticed by such reviewers as Edward Baugh and Marina Maxwell (who respectively described it as "remarkable" and "significant"); more recently it has been commended for its "pervading passion, intensity, and energy", referred to as a classic, and features on "must-read" lists of Jamaican books.

Particularly during the 1960s and 1970s, Barrett was a participant in significant drama and film projects in Britain, and became well known as an experimental and progressive essayist, his work being concerned with issues of black identity and dispossession, the African Diaspora, and the survival of descendants of black Africans, now dispersed around the world.

One of his sons is the Nigerian writer A. Igoni Barrett, with whom he has also worked professionally.

== Life in Jamaica ==
Lindsay Barrett was born in Lucea, Jamaica, into an agricultural family. His mother died giving birth to him. His father, Lionel Barrett, was a lifelong farmer and senior agriculturist with the Jamaican Ministry of Agriculture; his great-uncle, A. P. Hanson, founded the Jamaica Agricultural Society in the early 1930s. When he was five years old, Lindsay went to live with his grandparents, Joseph and Ella Barrett, because his father had to go on an assignment to another part of the Caribbean. In a 2025 interview, Barrett said:

My grandfather was a remarkable influence on me because very early in life he told me that we Jamaicans, especially Jamaicans of African descent, should always strive to remember our African heritage. He told me that we should regard ourselves as Africans first, not Jamaicans. ... So, all my adolescence in Jamaica, I was closely attracted to the African aspects of Jamaica's culture, the Rastafarianism. ... I was also deeply influenced by the thoughts of the great Marcus Garvey, who said that we are Africans first and Jamaicans second. But most importantly, probably because I grew up without my mother, I had always felt that we should keep close attachment to our roots, whatever roots we felt attracted to. And that has been the direction of my life.

Barrett attended Clarendon College in Jamaica, and he has written that he was inspired to decide to live in Africa by a visit that pan-Africanist Dudley Thompson paid to the school in 1957: "In that visit he spoke eloquently of the cultural links that existed between Africa, especially Ghana, and Jamaica. He told us that the future held great potential for the restoration of our souls if we found ways to renew our links with the continent."

After graduating from high school in 1959 Barrett worked as an apprentice journalist at the Daily Gleaner newspaper and for its sister afternoon tabloid The Star, gaining popularity as a columnist writing on entertainment and the music business. In early 1961, he became a news editor for the Jamaica Broadcasting Corporation, where his mentor was the Jamaican journalist and political analyst John Maxwell.

== Move to Europe: 1962–66 ==
Less than a year later, Barrett moved to England, where he worked as a freelancer for the BBC World Service in London and for the Transcription Centre, an organisation that recorded and broadcast the works of African writers in Europe and Africa.

In 1962, Barrett went to France, and during the next four years travelled throughout Europe and North Africa as a journalist and feature writer. While in Paris, he was associated with many notable black poets and artists, including Langston Hughes, Lebert "Sandy" Bethune, Ted Joans, Beauford Delaney and Herb Gentry. In 1966, Barrett's booklet The State of Black Desire (three poems and three essays "focusing on the theme of black alienation, exile, and black art"), illustrated by St. Kitts painter Larry Potter, was one of the first publications of the press of the Paris bookshop Shakespeare and Company. Referencing this debut work by Barrett, South African poet Keorapetse Kgositsile wrote in Black World that the language here "is part of the creation, a concrete vehicle carrying this big chunk of history smoking red straight from life.... Here are emotional, memorial, ideological attitudes which, if you want to commit to language, you have to go way beyond the limitations of English to embrace and sing...."

Barrett's first novel, Song for Mumu, was written between April 1962 and October 1966, and published in London by Longman in 1967.

Writing in 2023 at the age of 82, Barrett would say: "I left Jamaica without informing any member of my family that I would do so in my nineteenth year and so my twenties were spent in absolute exile from the heart of my upbringing. Whenever anyone asked me then what my objective for the future was I always told them I would be going to Africa to find out what the true character of my history really was. I must admit that the decision to do so at that time was based on romantic assumptions and naivete rather than on any well considered realistic plan of action, However, in the five years that I spent in Europe at that time I underwent an apprenticeship in feature writing and freelance broadcasting that was unparalleled. Instead of pursuing formal academic training as most of my peers were doing at that time I became a fanatic devotee of creative writing."

== Migration to Africa: 1966 onwards ==
In February 1966, Barrett left Paris to travel to Dakar, Senegal, for the first World Festival of Black Arts (1–24 April 1966). There – described by Negro Digest as "the fireball from Jamaica" – Barrett organised a poetry-reading session at the US Cultural Center. His plan had been to "visit and if possible work in Nkrumah's Ghana, for a short while after the festival. Unfortunately, by the time the festival ended Nkrumah was no longer on the seat in Ghana."

Having had in Paris a friend from Sierra Leone, Barrett decided that would be the first West African country where he would spend some time, and during the few months he was there (one of his hosts being the then Vice-Chancellor of the University of Sierra Leone, Professor Davidson Abioseh Nicol), he began work as a correspondent for West Africa magazine. Visiting Nigeria in July that year, Barrett took up residence there; he recollects being urged to go there by the writer John Pepper Clark, whom he had met in London in 1961, and whose play The Raft had influenced Barrett's own decision to begin writing plays, particularly one called Jump Kookoo Makka (which, like The Raft, would be performed at the Leicester University Commonwealth Arts Festival in 1967). He has said: "I came to Nigeria directly because I was influenced by her literature. I came to Africa because I wanted to renew the spirit of ancestral hope. I felt that there was hope in knowing where you came from and that we could renew our links, that we could strengthen our systems."

From 1966 to 1967, Barrett was Secretary of the Mbari Artists Club, which was "a hub of literary and cultural activities" in Ibadan: "We were in a historic, literary setting," he recalled, "when the civil war broke out and disintegrated everything." He was Director of the East Central State Information Service during the Nigerian Civil War under Chief Ukpabi Asika.

After a further stay in London at the beginning of the 1970s, Barrett returned in 1973 to Nigeria, where he was a founding member of the Nigerian Association of Patriotic Writers and Artistes. He took part in Festac '77, held in Lagos from 15 January 1977 to 12 February 1977, and features in the 2019 book FESTAC '77: The 2nd World Black and African Festival of Arts and Culture.

Barrett became a naturalised Nigerian citizen in the mid-1980s.

He has worked as a lecturer and has taught at many educational establishments in West Africa, including in Ghana, at Fourah Bay College in Sierra Leone, and at Nigeria's University of Ibadan, where he lectured on the roots of African and Afro-American literature at the invitation of Professors Wole Soyinka and the late Omafume Onoge.

Barrett is also a broadcaster, particularly in Nigerian radio and television, and has produced and presented critically acclaimed programmes on jazz, the arts, and Caribbean-African issues. He has been involved with many cultural initiatives, interacting with a wide range of African diaspora artists visiting Nigeria, including Ornette Coleman, Jimmy Cliff, Jayne Cortez, Melvin Edwards, and others.

In London in the 1980s, Barrett was part of Penumbra Productions, an independent production company, with members including Horace Ové, H. O. Nazareth, Farrukh Dhondy, Mustapha Matura, Michael Abbensetts and Margaret Busby, among whose projects was a series of films based on lectures by C. L. R. James.

== Writing ==
Summing up his writing career in an article on his 70th birthday, Barrett said: "I can remember a time in my early twenties when I lived in London, Frankfurt, Paris, and Tangier and, for a while in Tunisia and Libya, when I genuinely lived in a whirl of such oblivion that it appeared unlikely that I would ever witness my thirtieth birthday. For this reason I wrote at that time like one possessed and I still believe my work of that period represents the high points of my creative output. ... While the poetry and fiction that came later tends to be more cautious and formal than the fiction and poetry of my youth, in my journalistic output I seem to have become increasingly attached to formal reportage."

=== Novels ===
Barrett's first novel, Song for Mumu – "an allegorical novel of desire, love, and loss" – was published to acclaim in 1967 in London, where he took part in readings alongside writers associated with the Caribbean Artists Movement. The reviewer in The Observer said: "Lindsay Barrett's prose has vitality; it's usually simple, often demotic, packed with images. He can convey sensuality that is innocent and tragedy that is no less frightening for being unsought." A. R. Chisholm of the Melbourne Age described the novel as "violently, lyrically, movingly original: A primitive masterpiece."

Song for Mumu was one of the first titles published in 1974 by executive editor Charles Harris at Howard University Press in the US, where it was received favourably by critics such as Martin Levin of The New York Times, who commented that "What shines ... is its language." Reviewing the novel for Caribbean Quarterly, Edward Baugh wrote of "the way in which it moves in worlds of magic and madness, myth and primitive ritual, not so as to exploit their strangeness, but to make them familiar, to emphasise their immediate reality, no less real than the reality of the natural and everyday. In his own distinctive way, Barrett is doing something not dissimilar to what, in their separate ways, Wilson Harris and the Cuban Alejo Carpentier have done". More recently, Al Creighton writing in the Stabroek News referred to Song for Mumu as an "intriguingly poetic experimental novel", in the context of seeing Barrett as a disciple of Nigerian writer Gabriel Okara, "the virtual father of modern African literature in English". Song for Mumu featured among 308 titles on "the greatest list of Caribbean reads" that was produced in 2020 by the Bocas Lit Fest.

Barrett's second novel, Lipskybound, was published in Enugu, Nigeria, in 1977, and has influenced the work of many younger Nigerian writers who are interested in breaking the mould of traditional creative writing. As he himself described the work in 1972, having struggled for several years writing it: "It is an exposition of the heart of natural vengeance in the soul of the transplanted African and of the violent nature of the truth of his spirit out of necessity."

Barrett's third published novel, Veils of Vengeance Falling, appeared in 1985 and has been used as a set book in the Department of English at the University of Port Harcourt.

=== Plays and film scripts ===
From the 1960s onwards, Barrett authored many plays that were staged in England and in Nigeria. Jump Kookoo Makka was presented at the Leicester University Commonwealth Arts Festival in 1967 (directed by Cosmo Pieterse) and that same year Home Again was performed by Wole Soyinka's company.

Barrett's And After This We Heard of Fire was produced by the Ibadan Arts Theatre in Nigeria in 1971. In 1972, his theatrical collage of drama, dance and music, Sighs of a Slave Dream, was the first major production to be staged at the Keskidee Centre, in north London, performed by a Nigerian troupe under the direction of Pat Amadu Maddy. It portrays the capture and enslavement of Africans, their transport across the Atlantic, and their suffering on American plantations.

Over four nights in January 1973, Barrett's play Black Blast! – an exploration of Caribbean history through music, mime and dance – was performed in London, the first play by a Black writer at the Institute of Contemporary Arts (with an all-Black cast, including Yemi Ajibade, Yulisa Amadu Maddy, Leslie Palmer, Eddie Tagoe, Karene Wallace, Basil Wanzira, and Elvania Zirimu, directed by Horace Ové) and filmed for a special edition of the BBC 2's arts and entertainment programme Full House (broadcast on Saturday, 3 February 1973) devoted to the work of West Indian writers, artists, musicians and filmmakers. Black Blast! was described as "ritual theatre with music and dance" that "expresses in terms of raw bodily experience the history of the Black peoples of the world through colonization, slavery and the complexities of the neocolonialist era".

Various plays by Barrett have been performed at the Mbari Theatre of the University of Ibadan and on Nigerian National Radio. His work was also broadcast in the BBC's Thirty-Minute Theatre radio programme.

Barrett has occasionally written film scripts and commentaries, as for Horace Ové's 1973 BBC documentary King Carnival.

=== Poetry ===
Barrett is in addition a poet, whose early militant poems dealt with racial and emotional conflict and exile, as evidenced in his collection, The Conflicting Eye, published under the pseudonym "Eseoghene" (an Urhobo name meaning "God's gift") in 1973. That same year he produced a staged version of Linton Kwesi Johnson's poem Voices of the Living and the Dead at London's Keskidee Centre, with music by the reggae group Rasta Love. Barrett's subsequent volumes of poetry are A Quality of Pain and Other Poems (1986) and A Memory of Rivers; Poems Out of the Niger Delta (2006), both books published in Nigeria.

=== As editor and contributor ===
Barrett's work has appeared in anthologies, including Black Fire: an Anthology of Afro-American Writing, edited by LeRoi Jones (Imamu Amiri Baraka) and Larry Neal, and Black Arts: an Anthology of Black Creations in 1969. He wrote the foreword to a new edition of Amiri Baraka's Four Black Revolutionary Plays: Experimental Death Unit 1, A Black Mass, Great Goodness of Life, and Madheart, published in 1997. Barrett has been an associate editor of several periodicals, including Afriscope in Nigeria, and Transition Magazine in Uganda, and he was a contributor to seminal black British publications in the 1960s such as Daylight, Flamingo, Frontline and West Indian World.

He has also contributed numerous short stories, poems, essays, and articles to journals that include Black Orpheus, Negro Digest/Black World, Revolution, Two Cities, New African, Magnet, The Black Scholar, Black Lines, West Africa magazine, and The Africa Report.

=== Journalism and non-fiction ===
As a journalist, Barrett has written on the conflicts and ongoing political circumstances in Liberia and Sierra Leone, and was the co-founder, with Tom Kamara, of the Liberian newspaper The New Democrat. Barrett was a correspondent throughout Africa for the London-based news magazine West Africa for more than three decades, as well as working as a photo-journalist for a variety of publications. He maintained weekly columns in several Nigerian newspapers over the years, including his widely read "From the Other Side" in the Nigerian tabloid The Sun. Barrett continues to work as a political analyst and commentator on Nigerian current events. According to Ozolua Uhakheme: "In all the civil wars in the West coast of Africa, he has played the role of an interpreter of the essence for peace."

Barrett has regularly written on music, literature, film and other cultural and social issues. Having been a long-time friend of Fela Kuti, he wrote a Prologue for the 2010 Cassava Republic Press edition of the biography Fela: This Bitch of a Life by Carlos Moore. Among Barrett's other book contributions are literary interviews, such as one with Chinua Achebe conducted in London in June 1981, included in Conversations with Chinua Achebe (ed. Bernth Lindfors, 1997). In 2016, Barrett published a collection entitled Rainbow Reviews and Other Literary Adventures.

Barrett has also written books of non-fiction and biographies. His articles appear regularly in Nigerian newspapers such as Vanguard, Daily Trust, This Day, and The Guardian, and he also does reports for television.

Barrett is a contributor to the 2024 book Encounters with James Baldwin: Celebrating 100 Years (Supernova Books/Aurora Metro), with other featured writers including Anton Phillips, Fred D'Aguiar, Rashidah Ismaili AbuBakr, Ray Shell, and others.

== Visual art ==
In the earlier part of his career, Barrett was also on occasion a visual artist, as evidenced by his 1970s painting "Spirit Night", included in the exhibition Beyond Borders: Bill Hutson & Friends at the Mechanical Hall Gallery, University of Delaware (31 August – 9 December 2016), coinciding with the 80th birthday of African-American abstract artist Bill Hutson.

== Awards and accolades ==
- In 1970, Barrett's writing received the fifth Conrad Kent Rivers Memorial Award from the Illinois Arts Council.
- In 2004, writing about the depletion of the Black Arts Movement, Amiri Baraka referenced Barrett with the words: "Can someone summon Lindsay Barrett who left Jamaica for Nigeria, who erupted with a scarlet beauty?"
- In August 2009, Barrett's poetry collection A Memory of Rivers: Poems Out of the Niger Delta was one of nine books shortlisted for the $50,000 NLNG Prize in Nigeria.
- Barrett has been named as one of "The 11 Best Jamaican Writers", alongside Claude McKay, Roger Mais, Andrew Salkey, Sylvia Wynter, Lorna Goodison, Kerry Young, Margaret Cezair-Thompson, Colin Channer, Kei Miller, and Marlon James.
- On the occasion of Barrett's 75th birthday, 15 September 2016, Nigerian President Muhammadu Buhari issued a statement commending Barrett for "his love for Nigeria, which inspired his relocation from the Caribbean to settle in the country, raise a family and also take up Nigerian citizenship in the 80s", adding that "the thematic thrusts of [his] writings on Africa, Africans in Diaspora and Afro-Americans have contributed significantly to global discourse on the history and identity of the black race and the renewed interest in the future of Africa and people of African descent."
- In April 2017, Barrett was presented with a Lifetime Achievement Award "for excellence in creative writing" by the Institute of Arts and Culture at the University of Port Harcourt during the Gabriel Okara Literary Festival.

In an interview for Barrett's 80th birthday, Wole Olaoye described him as "the best export from the Caribbean to Motherland Nigeria in the last century." In 2026, following his 85th birthday, Barrett was described in the Vanguard newspaper as "one of the best-known Nigerians".

== Selected bibliography ==
=== Creative writing ===
- The State of Black Desire (three poems and three essays, illustrated by Larry Potter; Paris: Shakespeare and Co., 1966; reprinted Benin City, Nigeria: Ethiope, 1974).
- Song for Mumu (novel; London: Longman, 1967; Washington, DC: Howard University Press, 1974. Leeds: Peepal Tree Press, September 2026, ISBN 9781845236144).
- The Conflicting Eye (poems, published under the pseudonym Eseoghene; London: Paul Breman, 1973).
- Lipskybound (novel; Enugu, Nigeria: Bladi House, 1977).
- Veils of Vengeance Falling (novel; Enugu, Nigeria: Fourth Dimension, 1985, ISBN 9789781561788)
- A Quality of Pain and Other Poems (poems; Nigeria: Gaskiya Corporation, 1986, ISBN 9789781940729).
- A Memory of Rivers; Poems Out of the Niger Delta (poems; Nigeria: Daylight, 2006, ISBN 9789780193232).
- Visiting Eternity (poems, 2016).
- Rainbow Reviews and Other Literary Adventures (collected reviews, 2016).

=== As playwright and scriptwriter ===
- 1967: Jump Kookoo Makka, Leicester University Commonwealth Arts Festival
- 1971: And After This We Heard of Fire, Ibadan Arts Theatre, Nigeria
- 1972: Sighs of a Slave Dream, Keskidee Centre, London, directed by Pat Amadu Maddy
- 1973: Black Blast!, ICA, London
- 1974: Late Flood, Thirty Minute Theatre, BBC Radio 4

=== Non-fiction ===
- Danjuma, the Making of a General (biography; Enugu, Nigeria: Fourth Dimension, 1979).
- Agbada to Khaki: Reporting a Change of Government in Nigeria (non-fiction, Enugu, Nigeria: Fourth Dimension, 1985).
- Liberian Notes: A Study of Conflict and Resistance: A PACs Report, Yandia Printing Press, 1993.
- With Babatunde Faniyan, Wind of Hope: The Authorised Biography of Dr. Goodluck Ebele Jonathan (Onyoma Research Publications, Nigeria, 2010, ISBN 9789788195313)

=== Book contributions ===
- "The Tide Inside It Rages", in Amiri Baraka and Larry Neal (eds), Black Fire: An Anthology of Afro-American Writing (1968), Black Classic Press, 2007, ISBN 978-1574780390.
- "Giving Writers a Voice: an interview with Chinua Achebe", West Africa, 22 June 1981, 1405–07. Reprinted in Conversations with Chinua Achebe (ed. Bernth Lindfors), University of Mississippi, 1997.
- Foreword to Amiri Baraka, Four Black Revolutionary Plays: Experimental Death Unit 1, A Black Mass, Great Goodness of Life, Madheart, Marion Boyars Publishers, 1997, ISBN 9780714530055.
- Prologue to Carlos Moore, Fela: This Bitch of a Life, Cassava Republic Press edition, 2010, ISBN 978-978-9060924.
- "Meeting James Baldwin in Paris", in Encounters with James Baldwin: Celebrating 100 Years (Introduction by Stella Dadzie), Supernova Books/Aurora Metro, ISBN 9781913641412.

== See also ==
- Barrett family of Jamaica
