= J. Saunders Redding =

American writer and educator (1906–1988)

- Born: James Thomas Saunders Redding; October 13, 1906; Wilmington, Delaware, US
- Died: March 2, 1988 (aged 81); Ithaca, New York, US
- Education: Brown University (M.A.)
- Occupations: Author, educator
- Relatives: Louis L. Redding (brother)

J. Saunders Redding (October 13, 1906 – March 2, 1988) was an American professor and author. He was the first African-American faculty member in the Ivy League.

== Early life ==
J. Saunders Redding was born October 13, 1906, in Wilmington, Delaware. His parents were graduates of Howard University and members of the Black elite. After attending Lincoln University for a year, Redding transferred to Brown University, where he graduated in 1928. After marrying Esther Elizabeth James, Redding returned to Brown, and received his master's degree in literature there in 1932.

== Career ==
Reddings taught at various historically black colleges and universities, including Louisville Municipal College, Southern University, and Elizabeth City State College. He subsequently spent 20 years at the Hampton Institute, where he held an endowed chair.

In 1949, Redding was hired as a visiting professor at Brown University, becoming the first African American to teach at an Ivy League institution. His appointment ended after only one semester, despite his eagerness to remain in a permanent role.

As interest in Black literature and scholarship surged during the 1960s, Redding was able to move into roles at prestigious research universities, teaching at George Washington University and serving as a humanities fellow at Duke University.

In 1970, Redding became the first African-American professor at Cornell University's College of Arts and Sciences, serving in a tenured position as the Ernest I. White Professor of American Studies. He retired in 1975.

Redding died of heart failure on March 5, 1988, in Ithaca, New York, at the age of 81.

== Works ==
Redding's literary works include To Make a Poet Black (1939), an autobiography entitled No Day of Triumph (1944), Stranger and Alone (1950), On Being Negro in America (1951), They Came in Chains (1950, revised edition 1973), An American in India (1954), The Lonesome Road (1958), and Cavalcade (1970), an African-American literature anthology he edited with Arthur P. Davis.
