= Carlos Moore (writer) =

Cuban writer, journalist and academic (born 1942)

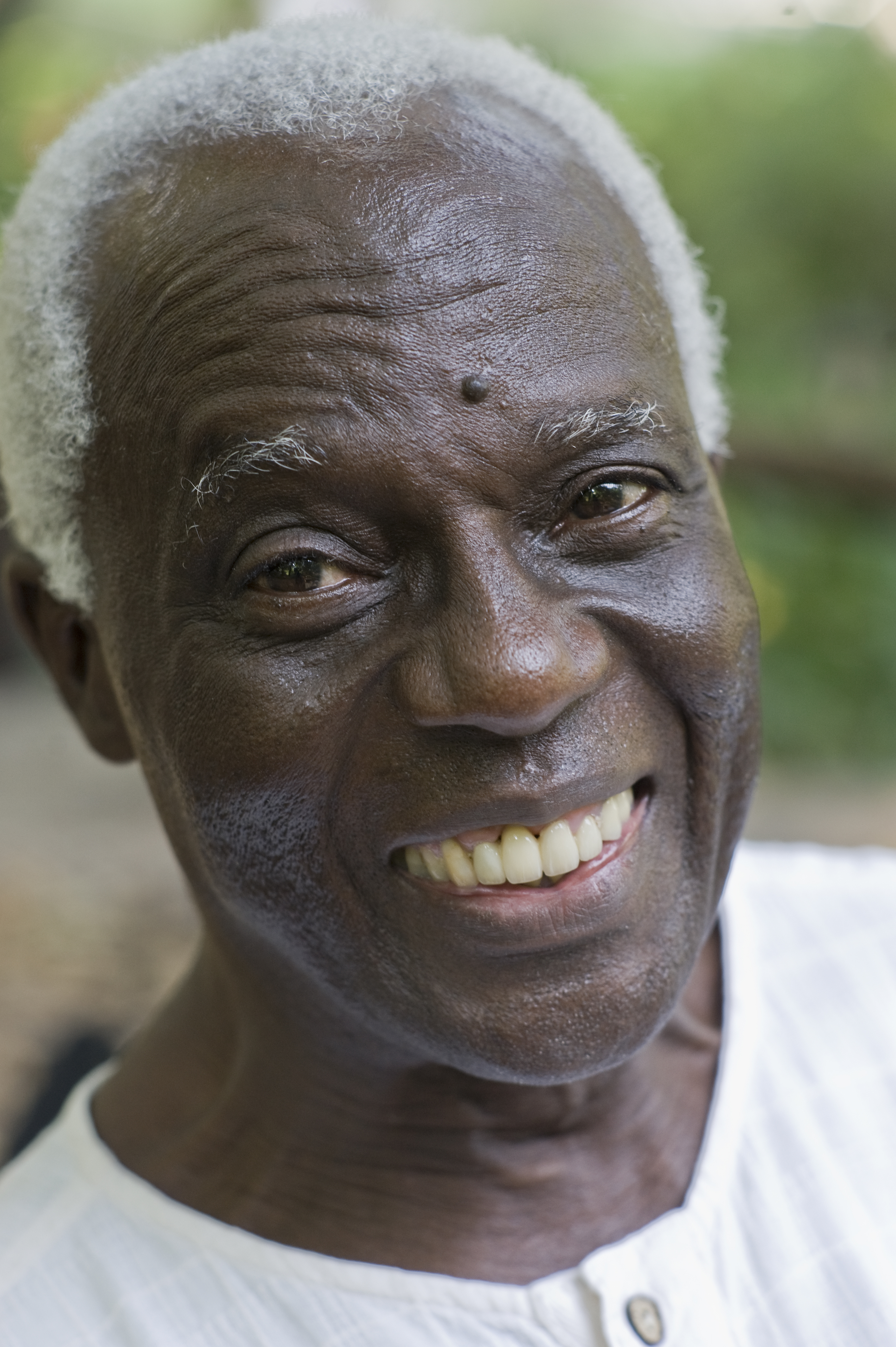
- Born: Charles Moore Wedderburn; 4 November 1942 (age 83); Minas, Cuba
- Education: Paris Diderot University
- Occupations: Writer, social researcher, activist, professor
- Writing career
- Pen name: Carlos Moore
- Notable work: Fela: This Bitch of a Life (1982)

Carlos Moore (born 4 November 1942) is a writer, social researcher, professor and activist, dedicated to the study of African and Afro-American history and culture. Moore holds two doctorates, in Human sciences and in Ethnology from the Paris Diderot University, and speaks five languages. At various periods he lived in France, Africa, the United States of America, Brazil and the Caribbean

Moore is widely recognized for his outspokenness against racism, defense of pan-Africanism, his scholarly work and for writing the authorized biography of the Nigerian singer, saxophonist and activist Fela Kuti, Fela, Fela: This Bitch of a Life (1982), which inspired the stage musical Fela!

== Biography ==
=== Early years ===
He was born Charles Moore Wedderburn in Lugareño (part of Minas in Camagüey Province of Cuba to working-class Jamaican parents. His biological father, Whitfield Marshall, was from Trinidad and Tobago and his mother, Winifred Rebecca Wedderburn, was from Jamaica. However, until his tenth birthday, Carlos Moore grew up with his mother and stepfather, Victor Moore, also from Jamaica, until the family disintegrated.

In 1958, to escape the civil war and in search of better opportunities, Moore at the age of 15 emigrated to New York City with his stepfather and siblings. In New York, Moore lived with his stepfather and his stepmother Gladys King, a native of Costa Rica. He attended high school, while being doubly impacted by the civil rights movement on the surge in the United States and the struggles for decolonisation of Africa. He returned to Cuba in 1961, at the height of the revolution, working as a translator in the Cuban Ministries of Communications and, later, of Foreign Affairs. However, he became unhappy with the way Fidel Castro's regime was handling matters pertaining to race. Denouncing what he perceived as an attempt by the Cuban government to ignore racism, Moore fell out of favor with the leadership and was imprisoned twice. After taking refuge in the Guinean embassy he fled the island on 4 November 1963 and sought refuge in Egypt and France.

=== Exile and career ===
Carlos Moore arrived in Egypt in December 1963 at the age of 21. He worked for a year with an African liberation movement led by Jonas Savimbi, a pro-Maoist Angolan leader with whom Moore was close during this period. One year after his arrival in Egypt, Moore was imprisoned for a month by the immigration authorities of that country for being in an irregular situation. After this, he left Egypt and took refuge in France in 1964, where the Cuban authorities refused him a passport. In France, Moore received an interdisciplinary education at the University of Paris 7, where he earned two doctorates, one in ethnology and the other the prestigious Doctorat d'État in human sciences.

From 1970 to 1984, Moore was active in various professional fields. In Paris, he was a Latin America desk journalist at Agence France-Presse (AFP) and a political journalist in African affairs for the weekly magazine Jeune Afrique. He studied and worked in France until 1974, when he became involved in the initial phase of FESTAC '77 (the Second World Black Festival of Arts and Culture) in Lagos, Nigeria. He then moved to Senegal, where, at the invitation of the scientist Cheikh Anta Diop, he lived for several years with his family. Moore, who was already a friend of Diop's, became his personal assistant on pan-African projects, also serving him as interpreter/translator. At the time, Diop ran the radiocarbon laboratory of the Institut Fondamental d'Afrique Noire (IFAN) in Dakar, Senegal.

Years later, Moore was a personal consultant for Latin American affairs to the Secretary General of the Organization of African Unity (OAU), Dr. Edem Kodjo.

Between 1986 and 1988, Moore was a visiting professor in the department of sociology at Florida International University. In 1987, he organized the conference Negritude, Afro Cultures and Ethnicity in the Americas with the participation of renowned intellectuals such as Aimé Césaire, Maya Angelou, Leopold Senghor, Alex Haley, Victoria Santa Cruz, Rex Nettleford, Lélia Gonzalez, Manuel Zapata Olivella, Rex Nettleford, and Abdias do Nascimento. In 1988, Lincoln University in Philadelphia, Pennsylvania, invited him as Professor of Negritude, Race and Diaspora Studies.

In the period between 1990 and 1994, Moore taught international relations courses at the University of the Antilles and Guyana, with branches in Martinique, Guadeloupe and Guyana, and from 1996 to 2002, he was a senior lecturer of Latin American affairs at the Institute of International Relations of the University of the West Indies, at Trinidad and Tobago. Concurrently, he was a personal consultant on Latin American affairs to the Secretary General of the Caribbean Community (CARICOM), Dr. Edwin Carrington.

In 1982, the authorized biography of Nigerian Afrobeat musician Fela Kuti, written by Moore, was published, Kuti being a personal friend of the writer. Fela, Fela: Cette Putain de Vie was first published in France, in 1982, by Éditions Karthala, then in the United Kingdom as Fela: This Bitch of a Life, by Allison and Busby. The biography has since been translated into six languages. In 2009, the book was reissued in the US by Lawrence Hill Books, including a foreword by Gilberto Gil and an introduction by Margaret Busby, and was subsequently published in a Nigerian edition by Cassava Republic Press, with an additional prologue by Lindsay Barrett. The Broadway musical Fela! (2009–2011) was inspired by Moore's biography, as recognized in the settlement of a copyright dispute over stage production rights.

The 2019 documentary film My Friend Fela (Meu amigo Fela), made by Joel Zito Araújo, explores the complexity of Kuti's life "through the eyes and conversations" of Moore.

In recent years, Moore has been living with his family between Brazil and Guadeloupe, writing about global racism, particularly racism in Brazil.

== Personal life ==
Moore's first wife, Shawna, was from the US, and they had a son together, Kimathi. Moore's second wife, Ayeola, a dancer and painter, whom he married in 1992, is from Guadeloupe.

== Selected bibliography ==
- Were Marx and Engels Racists? – The prolet-Aryan outlook of Marx and Engels, Chicago: Institute of Positive Education, 1972. Accessed 4 February 2013.
- Castro, the Blacks, and Africa, Los Angeles: Center for Afro-American Studies, University of California, 1988, ISBN 978-0934934329.
- African Presence in the Americas (with Tanya R. Sanders and Shawna Moore, eds), Trenton, NJ: Africa World Press, 1995, ISBN 978-0865432321.
- Pichón – A Memoir: Race and Revolution in Castro's Cuba (Foreword by Maya Angelou), Chicago: Lawrence Hill Books/Chicago Review Press, 2008, ISBN 978-1556527678.
- A África Que Incomoda: sobre a problematização do legado africano no quotidiano brasileiro, Belo Horizonte, Brazil: Editora Nandyala, 2008, 2010, ISBN 978-8561191047.
- Preface to the book Discurso sobre A Negritude by Aimé Césaire, Belo Horizonte, Brazil: Editora Nandyala, 2010, ISBN 9788561191337.
- Racismo & Sociedade, Belo Horizonte, Brazil: Editora Nandyala, 2012. ISBN 9788561191719.

=== Fela Kuti biography – editions and translations ===
- Fela, Fela: Cette Putain de Vie (French edition), Paris, France: Éditions Karthala, 1982, ISBN 978-2865370405.
- Fela, Fela: This Bitch of a Life (first English-language edition), London, United Kingdom: Allison & Busby, 1982, ISBN 978-0850314649.
- Fela: This Bitch of a Life (revised English-language edition, with Foreword by Gilberto Gil and Introduction by Margaret Busby), Chicago, United States: Lawrence Hill Books/Chicago Review Press, 2009, ISBN 978-1556528354.
- Fela: This Bitch of a Life (with Preface by Gilberto Gil, and Prologue by Lindsay Barrett), Abuja, Nigeria: Cassava Republic Press, 2010, ISBN 978-9789060924.
- Fela, Esta vida Puta (Portuguese translation by Bruno Madeira: Preface by Gilberto Gil), Belo Horizonte, Brazil: Editora Nandyala, 2011, ISBN 9788561191467.
- Fela, Questa bastarda di una vita (Italian translation by Marco Zanotti), Arcana, 2012, ISBN 978-8862312318.
- Fela, This Bitch of a Life (translated to Japanese by Junko Kikuchi), Tokyo, Japan: Kenbukkusu, 2013, ISBN 978-4-7738-1311-1.
- Fela Kuti: This Bitch of a Life (German translation), Berlin: Haffmans & Tolkemitt, 2013, ISBN 978-3942989435.
