= List of first minority male lawyers and judges in Delaware =

This is a list of the first minority male lawyer(s) and judge(s) in Delaware. It includes the year in which the men were admitted to practice law (in parentheses). Also included are other distinctions such as the first minority men in their state to graduate from law school or become a political figure.

== Firsts in Delaware's history ==
=== Lawyers ===
- First Jewish American male: Aaron Finger (1912)
- First African American male: Louis L. Redding (1929)
- First Native American male: Kenneth S. Clark, Jr. (1982)

=== State judges ===
- First Jewish American male (justice of the peace): Moses Weil in 1901
- First Italian American male: James Gallo in 1901
- First Jewish American male: Aaron Finger (1912) in 1917
- First Jewish American male (superior court): Daniel L. Herrmann in 1951
- First African American male: Sidney Clark (1956) in 1961
- First Jewish American male (Delaware Supreme Court; justice and chief justice): Daniel L. Herrmann in 1964 and 1973 respectively
- First African American male (Delaware Superior Court): Joshua W. Martin III in 1982
- First African American male (chief judge): Alex J. Smalls in 1997
- First Native American male: Kenneth S. Clark, Jr. in 2000 (upon his appointment to the Court of Common Pleas)
- First African American male (Delaware Supreme Court): N. Christopher Griffiths in 2023

=== Federal judges ===
- First Jewish American male (U.S. District Court for the District of Delaware): Murray Merle Schwartz in 1974
- First African American male (U.S. District Court for the District of Delaware): Gregory M. Sleet (1976) in 1998
- First African American male (magistrate; Southern District Court of Delaware): Courtney Houston

=== Attorney General of Delaware ===
- First Jewish American male: H. Albert Young in 1950

=== United States Attorney ===
- First African American male: Gregory M. Sleet (1976)

=== Delaware State Bar Association ===
- First African American male (president): Joshua W. Martin III

== Firsts in local history ==
- Leonard Williams (1959): First African American male to serve on the Wilmington Municipal Court (1966) [New Castle County, Delaware]

== See also ==
- List of first minority male lawyers and judges in the United States

== Other topics of interest ==
- List of first women lawyers and judges in the United States
- List of first women lawyers and judges in Delaware
