= Song for Mumu =

1967 novel by Lindsay Barrett

- Author: Lindsay Barrett
- Cover artist: Drawing by Lindsay Barrett
- Language: English
- Publisher: Longmans
- Publication date: 1967; 59 years ago
- Media type: Print
- Pages: 154 pp.

Song for Mumu is the debut novel of Jamaican-born writer Lindsay Barrett. Written between April 1962 and October 1966 while the author lived in Frankfurt, Germany, Paris, France, and Accra, Ghana, it was published in 1967 by Longmans in London, England, where Barrett participated in readings alongside writers associated with the Caribbean Artists Movement.

Set on an unnamed Caribbean island, Song for Mumu is characterised as "an allegorical novel of desire, love, and loss". It was favourably noticed on publication by such reviewers as Edward Baugh and Marina Maxwell (who respectively described it as "remarkable" and "significant"). It has also been called "a stylistic masterpiece of modern black fiction".

== Reception ==
Among positive critical coverage that Song for Mumu received on first publication, the review in The Observer said: "Lindsay Barrett's prose has vitality; it's usually simple, often demotic, packed with images. He can convey sensuality that is innocent and tragedy that is no less frightening for being unsought." A. R. Chisholm of the Melbourne Age described the novel as "violently, lyrically, movingly original: A primitive masterpiece." Reviewing it for Caribbean Quarterly, Edward Baugh wrote of "the way in which it moves in worlds of magic and madness, myth and primitive ritual, not so as to exploit their strangeness, but to make them familiar, to emphasise their immediate reality, no less real than the reality of the natural and everyday. In his own distinctive way, Barrett is doing something not dissimilar to what, in their separate ways, Wilson Harris and the Cuban Alejo Carpentier have done".

Following the Longmans 1967 UK edition, Song for Mumu became in 1974 one of the first titles published by executive editor Charles Harris at Howard University Press in the US. The New York Times reviewer, after suggesting that Barrett's writing lacked "enough philosophical connective", ultimately commented: "What shines in the book is its language." Song for Mumu has also been called "the most explicit novel of frustration. Death and murder, insanity and poverty converge like dervishes. Yet out of it, Barrett succeeds in creating a world of physical liberation through song and dance celebrating black African heritage in Black America and Jamaica — recounting the ex-slave’s oral tradition."

Philip Royster championed the book as "one of the most important novels that records, reflects, and criticizes the black experience" and "a stylistic masterpiece of modern black fiction", while examining the reasons some other critics had expressed less favourable views in the past, and concluded in a 1982 article: "The novel captures the people's urge for the land of the country, for family relationships, for security and love, for identity and purpose, and for peace and God....As with Jean Toomer's Cane, the meaning of Song for Mumu, its purpose and theme, must be analyzed by abstraction, association and inference. It is a poetic novel, not an essay. Scholars, critics and teachers have the opportunity to render the work accessible to a broad audience of students and readers so that it will not be neglected for forty years as was Cane."

More recently, Song for Mumu has been commended for its "pervading passion, intensity, and energy", and called a classic. Al Creighton writing in the Stabroek News in 2018 referred to Song for Mumu as an "intriguingly poetic experimental novel", in the context of seeing Barrett – who settled in Nigeria in the 1960s – as a disciple of Nigerian writer Gabriel Okara, "the virtual father of modern African literature in English".

Song for Mumu featured among 308 titles on "the greatest list of Caribbean reads" that was produced in 2020 by the Bocas Lit Fest.

== Editions ==
- London: Longman, 1967;
  Washington, DC: Howard University Press, 1974.
  Leeds: Peepal Tree Press, September 2026, ISBN 9781845236144.
