= Dudley Thompson (Jamaican politician) =

Jamaican politician (1917–2012)

The Most Honourable Dudley Thompson OJ KC

Minister of Foreign Affairs and Foreign Trade
- In office 1975–1977
- Prime Minister: Michael Manley
- Preceded by: Michael Manley
- Succeeded by: P. J. Patterson

Personal details
- Born: Dudley Joseph Thompson; 19 January 1917 Panama
- Died: 20 January 2012 (aged 95) New York City, U.S.
- Party: People's National Party
- Spouse: Genevieve Hannah Cezair
- Children: 4, including Margaret
- Education: Merton College, Oxford
- Occupation: Lawyer, politician and diplomat

Military service
- Allegiance: United Kingdom
- Branch/service: Royal Air Force
- Years of service: 1941–1945
- Rank: Flight lieutenant

Dudley Joseph Thompson OJ KC (19 January 1917 – 20 January 2012) was a Jamaican Pan-Africanist, lawyer, politician and diplomat, who made a contribution to jurisprudence and politics in the Caribbean, Africa and elsewhere internationally.

== Early life and education ==
Born in Panama, to Daniel and Ruby Thompson, he was raised in Westmoreland, Jamaica, where in the 1930s he won a scholarship to The Mico (now Mico University College), training there as a teacher for three years. After a short period as headmaster of a rural school, he joined the Royal Air Force during the Second World War – one of Britain's first black pilots – and saw active service (1941–45) as a flight lieutenant in RAF Bomber Command over Europe, being awarded several decorations.

Thompson married Genevieve Hannah Cezair in 1945; they had a son and three daughters, including the novelist Margaret Cezair-Thompson.

In 1946, he went to England to attend Merton College, Oxford, where he studied jurisprudence, as a Rhodes Scholar, obtaining degrees as a Bachelor of Arts and Bachelor of Civil Law.

== Political career ==
From his university days, Thompson was a close associate of pan-Africanists such as Kwame Nkrumah, George Padmore and C. L. R. James. In 1945, he attended the Fifth Pan-African Congress in Manchester, along with Nkrumah, Padmore plus people such as Joe Appiah, W. E. B. Du Bois, Jomo Kenyatta, I. T. A. Wallace-Johnson and Jaja Wachuku.

After qualifying as a barrister at Gray's Inn, London, in 1950, and doing tutelage with Dingle Foot, QC, Thompson went on to practise law in Africa – in Tanganyika and Kenya, where he became involved in the nationalist movements. He assembled the international legal team that defended Jomo Kenyatta in his trial after he had been arrested by the colonial government of Kenya in 1952 and subsequently charged with treason, accused of being an instigator of the Mau Mau rebellion. Later as President of Kenya, Kenyatta memorably placed his hand on Thompson sitting beside him and said: "This man saved my life." In Tanzania, where he was a friend of Julius Nyerere, Thompson is remembered as a founder of the Tanganyika African National Union (TANU).

In 1955, he returned to Jamaica, where he introduced the Office of the Ombudsman, serving for many years, from 1962, as president of the Jamaica Bar Association. He continued to educate people about furthering the links between Africa and the Caribbean, visiting schools to deliver inspirational addresses about the continent (Jamaica-born writer Lindsay Barrett was inspired to decide to live in Africa by one such visit that Thompson paid to his school, Clarendon College, in 1957).

Thompson practised law in Trinidad, Barbados, St. Kitts, Dominica, Bermuda, Grenada, The Bahamas, Belize and elsewhere in the West Indies, playing a role in the independence movements of both Belize and the Bahamas. In 1962, he successfully lobbied for the colour scheme black–gold–green (the colours of the African National Congress) to be used as the basis of the Flag of Jamaica. He was appointed a Queen's Counsel in 1963.

From 1962 to 1978, he served as a member of the Jamaican Senate, and, from 1978 to 1983, as a member of the House of Representatives.

In the People's National Party (PNP) administration under Prime Minister Michael Manley, he was Minister of State for Foreign Affairs (1972–7), Minister of Mining and Natural Resources (1977–78), and Minister of National Security and Justice (1978–80). He was also a vice-president and later chairman of the PNP.

Shortly before his death, Thompson apologised for his role in the Green Bay Massacre, when members of the military ambushed young Jamaica Labour Party (JLP0 supporters, and shot them down in cold blood.

Thompson represented Jamaica in many international forums, including the United Nations and the Organization of African Unity (OAU). In 1992 he was empanelled as a member of the Eminent Persons Group charged with implementing the movement for reparations for slavery to Africa and the African diaspora, under the auspices of the OAU.

Thompson was appointed Ambassador and High Commissioner to several African countries, including Nigeria, Ghana, Namibia and Sierra Leone, based in Nigeria until 1995.

He died at the age of 95 in New York City.

== Awards ==
Thompson was a recipient of the Order of Jamaica, one of Jamaica's most prestigious decorations, for distinguished service in the field of International Affairs and his contribution to the legal developments in Jamaica.

He was awarded the Mico Old Students' Gold Medal – the most prestigious teacher's award.

The African Union declared him a "first citizen" passport of the continent because of his work for Africa internationally. The OAU had earlier awarded him a medal in recognition of his status as a "Legend of Africa".

In 2006, in Ghana he was honoured as a "Living Legend of Africa".
