= Louis L. Redding =

American lawyer

- Born: October 25, 1901; Alexandria, Virginia, US
- Died: September 28, 1998 (aged 96); Lima, Pennsylvania, US
- Education: Brown University; Harvard Law School
- Occupation: Lawyer
- Known for: Civil rights activism
- Relatives: J. Saunders Redding (brother)

Louis Lorenzo Redding (October 25, 1901 – September 28, 1998) was an American lawyer and civil rights advocate from Wilmington, Delaware. The first African American to be admitted to the Delaware bar, Redding was part of the NAACP legal team that challenged school segregation in the Brown v. Board of Education case before the U.S. Supreme Court. He was 96 when he died at a hospital in Lima, Pennsylvania.

== Background ==
Louis Redding was born in Alexandria, Virginia, to parents Lewis Alfred Redding and Mary Ann (Holmes) Redding, but moved to Wilmington, Delaware, during his childhood. The Redding family resided at 203 East 10th Street in the heart of Wilmington's African American community. Redding attended segregated public schools and graduated from Howard High School (the only high school for African Americans in the state at the time) in 1919. He subsequently enrolled at Brown University and won the Gaston Prize Medal Contest in oratory his senior year for a talk on Booker T. Washington. He graduated from Brown with honors in 1923.

After graduation, Redding became vice principal of Fessenden Academy in Ocala, Florida, and later taught at Morehouse College in Atlanta, Georgia. In 1925, Redding entered Harvard Law School. He was the only African American in Harvard Law's 1928 graduating class. Redding was admitted to the Delaware bar in the following year.

== Career ==
Telegram to Governor J. Caleb Boggs requesting assistance to integrate Milford High School in 1954

Redding began practicing law in Delaware in 1929, becoming the first African American lawyer in Delaware. He remained the sole non-white lawyer for more than 25 years. Redding handled cases that successfully challenged discrimination in housing, public accommodations, employment, and the criminal justice system.

Redding represented the plaintiffs in several Delaware cases that challenged segregation in Delaware. In 1950, he brought a case before the Chancery Court against the University of Delaware, which barred black students from admission, citing the "separate but equal" doctrine. Parker v. the University of Delaware was decided for the plaintiffs, thereby requiring the University to admit black students. It was the first state-funded undergraduate institution to desegregate by court order.

In 1952, Redding brought two cases to desegregate public schools in Claymont (Belton v. Gebhart) and Hockessin (Bulah v. Gebhart). Gebhart v. Belton was combined with cases from three other states and the District of Columbia to become part of the landmark U.S. Supreme Court case in 1954 known as Brown v. Board of Education. Redding argued the Brown case with a team of attorneys that included Thurgood Marshall. Redding also successfully argued Burton v. Wilmington Parking Authority before the US Supreme Court in 1961 which held that segregation in public accommodations was not permissible.

He practiced law for 57 years, opening doors to education and accommodations for many in Delaware and the nation. After his death in 1998, the University of Delaware established the Louis L. Redding Chair for the Study of Law and Public Policy. In 2009, the Redding House Foundation opened the Redding House Museum in his childhood home in Wilmington. A residence hall (opened in 2013) at the University of Delaware's Newark Campus was named after him. In 2016, an historic marker dedicated to Louis L. Redding was unveiled in Wilmington's East Side neighborhood.

== Personal ==
Louis Redding was the eldest of seven children. Redding's brother, J. Saunders Redding, was a noted author and college professor. His sisters Lillian Redding Bailey and C. Gwendolyn Redding were teachers in the Wilmington School System. Two of his siblings, Joseph and Hattie, died in childhood and another, Jannetta Mayson Redding, died during her college years. Louis Redding was married twice. He had three daughters—Ann, Rupa, and Judith—with his first wife Ruth Albert Cook Redding. After they divorced he married Gwendolyn Carmen Kiah.

== Recognition ==
In January 2025, President Joe Biden named Redding as a recipient of the Presidential Citizens Medal, along with nineteen others.

Louis L. Redding Comprehensive High School was named after Redding.

== See also ==
- List of first minority male lawyers and judges in Delaware
