= Evangelyn Barsky =

American lawyer

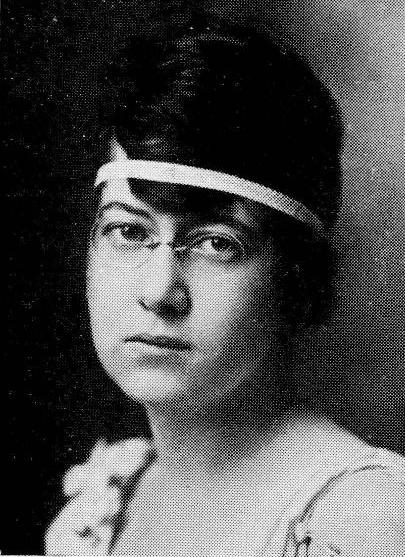
- Born: 31 March 1894
- Died: 13 September 1936 (aged 42)
- Alma mater: Goucher College
- Occupation: Lawyer

Evangelyn Barsky (March 31, 1894 – September 13, 1936) was, along with Sybil Ward, one of the first two women lawyers regularly admitted to practice in Delaware.

== Biography ==
Barsky was born on March 31, 1894, in Wilmington, Delaware, to Nathan Barsky, a dry goods merchant, and Rose Barsky. Her father was a successful businessman and her parents were involved with the local community, especially Jewish organizations such as Temple Beth Emeth.

She graduated from Wilmington High School. After graduation she entered received higher education from Goucher College and the University of Pennsylvania. Barsky earned a BA in 1916 from Goucher, and an MA and L.L.B. from the University of Pennsylvania in 1918 and 1922, respectively. In the 1910s, Barsky drove for the women's motor car corps of the First World War. Delaware had allowed women to practice law in 1923, and a month after they first applied to the state's legal bar, on March 26, 1923, Barsky and Sybil Ward were admitted to practice law in Delaware. Barsky entered into a practice with one of her brothers, where she remained for about a decade. On July 2, 1935, she was made an assistant city solicitor in Wilmington and left the private practice.

On September 13, 1936, Barsky was killed in a car crash. Her funeral was attended by hundreds, including Walter W. Bacon, the mayor of Wilmington.

Barsky was a member of the League of Women Voters, New Century Club, American Association of University Women, and the New Castle County Bar Association, Delaware State Bar Association, and American Bar Association.

== See also ==
- List of first women lawyers and judges in Delaware
