= Paulette Sullivan Moore =

American lawyer

Paulette Sullivan Moore is Delaware’s first African American female lawyer.

She completed her legal education at Rutgers University Law School (1976). In 1977, Moore became the first African American female admitted to practice law in Delaware. In the same year, she was admitted to practice before Delaware's U.S. District Court and the Third Circuit of the U.S. Court of Appeals. During the 1990s, Moore served as the New Castle County Recorder of Deeds. She has worked as a Policy Coordinator for the Delaware Coalition Against Domestic Violence and the Vice President of Public Policy of the National Network to End Domestic Violence.

On July 17, 2023, Governor John Carney of Delaware announced Moore as one of the inductees into the Hall of Fame of Delaware Women.

== See also ==
- List of first women lawyers and judges in Delaware
