= Russell Atkins =

American poet, playwright and composer (1926–2024)

Russell Atkins (February 25, 1926 – August 15, 2024) was an American poet, playwright and composer from Cleveland, Ohio, known primarily for his contributions to avant garde poetry. He was born Russell Phillip Kelly, on February 25, 1926, in Cleveland, Ohio, to Perry Kelly and Sarah Harris, but was adopted by three women named Mamie Belle Atkins, Willie Mae Allen and their mother. He was raised on Cleveland's east side and resided in the family home until 2010. He later moved to an assisted living facility and then to a nursing home named Algart Healthcare on the city's west side until his death.

== Biography ==
Trained as a musician and visual artist, Atkins studied at Cleveland College, Cleveland Music School Settlement, Cleveland Institute of Music, Karamu House, and Cleveland School of Art.

His plays The Abortionist and The Corpse debuted in 1954. Following this, he founded Free Lance, A Magazine of Poetry and Prose in 1950 with his friend, Adelaide Simon, with the first issue containing an introduction by Langston Hughes. It attracted writers from all over the world, leading the now-defunct Black World to call it "the only Black literary magazine of national importance in existence." In 1959 Free Lance Press began publishing books, with a volume of poetry from Conrad Kent Rivers. Free Lance was under Atkins leadership for more than two decades, and allowed Atkins to correspond with writers from across the country.

In 2017 the City of Cleveland granted a portion of Grand Avenue the supplementary name "Russell Atkins Way" in his honor.

Atkins died on August 15, 2024, at the age of 98.

== Works ==
Atkins was one of the first Concrete poets in the United States, arranging the words on the page to enhance poems' meaning. He was also an innovator in poetic drama. Much of Atkins' work, including the verse drama The Abortionist, was published in issues of The Free Lance a literary journal published by Free Lance Press of Cleveland, Ohio.

Langston Hughes and Carl Van Vechten introduced Atkins' work to magazines. Hughes read his poems at the University of Michigan and the University of Chicago, and Marrianne Moore read them on the radio in 1951.

Atkins' books include Phenomena (1961), Objects (1963), Heretofore (1968), Maleficum (1971), Objects 2 (1973) and Here in The (1976), which is Atkins' only full-length poetry collection.

== Critical reception ==
Despite being published almost forty years ago and being long out of print, Here in The continues to attract critical attention. In 2014 the poet Joshua Ware, who teaches at Case Western Reserve University in Cleveland, Ohio wrote that "Atkins creates a singular, Cleveland-based beauty in his language and the sounds it produces." And "the poet surveys the city, its residents, and surroundings, noting how even traditionally beatific images, such as a sunset, can transform into something less gorgeous in the crumbling urban cityscapes."

Patrick James Dunagan wrote: "Both prolific and diverse, Russell Atkins’ literary output crosses over traditional divisions of genre, style, and form."

In 2013 the Pleiades Press at the University of Missouri published a collection entitled Russell Atkins: On the Life and Work of an American Master, and in October 2014 several of Atkins’ friends organized a reading and celebration of the poet's work at the East Cleveland Public Library in East Cleveland, Ohio.

In 2017 he was awarded the Cleveland Arts Prize for his lifetime achievement.

In 2019, World'd Too Much: The Selected Poetry of Russell Atkins, edited by Kevin Prufer and Robert E. McDonough, was published by the Cleveland State University Poetry Center.

The Stuart A. Rose Manuscript, Archives, and Rare Book Library at Emory University holds the Russell Atkins collection, 1969–1997.
