= List of first women lawyers and judges in Delaware =

This is a list of the first women lawyer(s) and judge(s) in Delaware. It includes the year in which the women were admitted to practice law (in parentheses). Also included are women who achieved other distinctions such becoming the first in their state to graduate from law school or become a political figure.

== Firsts in Delaware's history ==
=== Law School ===
- First female to complete law school without first attending college: Helen Balick (1969) in 1966

=== Lawyers ===
- First females (1923): Evangilyn Barsky and Sybil Ward
- First female prosecutor: Marguerite Hopkins Bodziak in 1933
- First Hispanic American (female) (1976): Aida Waserstein
- First African American female (1977): Paulette Sullivan Moore
- First Latino American female of Puerto Rican descent (1980): Nivea Castro
- First South Asian Indian (female): Shakuntla Bhaya

=== State judges ===
- First female: Roxana Cannon Arsht (1941) in 1971
- First female (Court of Chancery): Carolyn Berger (1976) in 1984
- First female (Delaware Superior Court): Susan C. Del Pesco in 1988
- First African American female: Haile L. Alford in 1992
- First female magistrate (Chief Magistrate; Justice of the Peace Court): Patricia W. Griffin in 1993
- First female (Delaware Supreme Court): Carolyn Berger (1976) in 1994
- First Hispanic American (female): Aida Waserstein in 1996
- First female (Delaware Court of Common Pleas): Rosemary Betts Beauregard in 1999
- First female (Chief Judge; Delaware Family Court): Chandlee Johnson Kuhn in 2003
- First African American female (Delaware Family Court): Arlene M. Coppadge in 2003
- First female (commissioner; Delaware Court of Common Pleas): Mary M. McDonough in 2004
- First Hispanic American (female) (Justice of the Peace Court): Michelle Jewell in 2010
- First Hispanic American (female) (Delaware Superior Court): Vivian L. Medinilla (née Rapposelli) in 2013
- First (openly lesbian) female (President of the Delaware Superior Court): Jan R. Jurden in 2015
- First African American (female) (Supreme Court of Delaware): Tamika Montgomery-Reeves in 2020
- First African American females (Delaware Court of Common Pleas): Rae M. Sims and Monica A. Horton in 2020. Horton, who is biracial, also became the first Asian American (female) judge in Delaware upon her appointment.
- First (female) South Asian (Delaware Superior Court): Sonia Augusthy in 2025

=== Federal judges ===
- First female (United States Bankruptcy Court): Helen Balick (1969) in 1974
- First female (United States District Court for the District of Delaware): Jane Richards Roth in 1985
- First female (United States Court of Appeals for the Third Circuit): Jane Richards Roth in 1991
- First female (Chief Judge; United States Court of Appeals for the Third Circuit): Sue Lewis Robinson in 2000

=== Assistant United States Attorney ===
- First female: Peggy L. Ableman from 1979-1983

=== Attorney General of Delaware ===
- First female: M. Jane Brady (1977) from 1995-2005

=== Deputy Attorney General ===
- First female: Ruth Farrell in 1962

=== Political Office ===
- First female (House of Representatives): Melanie George Smith in 2002

=== Delaware State Bar Association ===
- First female president: Susan C. Del Pesco

== Firsts in local history ==
- Frances M. "Mickey" Messina: First female to serve as a Commissioner for the Kent County Levy Court (1972)
- Cathleen Hutchison: First female to serve as Deputy Chief Magistrate for the Justice of the Peace Court in Kent County, Delaware (2017)
- Marguerite Hopkins Bodziak (1931): First female to serve as an Assistant City Solicitor in Wilmington, Delaware (1933) [New Castle County, Delaware]
- Sara Pennington: First female magistrate in New Castle County, Delaware (1953)
- Phila Furry George: First female lawyer for the Hercules Powder Company in Wilmington, Delaware (1943) [New Castle County, Delaware]
- Haile L. Alford: First African American female to serve on the Superior Court of New Castle County (1992)
- Lisa Roberson Hatfield: First female to serve as the Alderman's Court for Newark (2007)
- Jan R. Jurden: First female to become President of the New Castle County Superior Court, Delaware (2012)
- Battle Robinson (1971): First female lawyer in Sussex County, Delaware
- Rosemary Betts Beauregard: First female judge in Sussex County, Delaware
- Michelle Jewell: First Hispanic American magistrate in Sussex County, Delaware

== See also ==
- List of first women lawyers and judges in the United States
- Timeline of women lawyers in the United States
- Women in law

== Other topics of interest ==
- List of first minority male lawyers and judges in the United States
- List of first minority male lawyers and judges in Delaware
