= Barrett family of Jamaica =

Jamaican family including prominent members

Some members of the Barrett family played an important role in the history of Jamaica. Hercie Barrett and family members migrated from England, landing on the island of Jamaica in 1655. In the years that followed, several family members acquired substantial wealth and influence. They controlled much of the island's mining and agriculture, becoming one of the most prominent plantation owners of Jamaica.

== First Barrett families in Jamaica ==
The first recorded land patent in the Barrett name was recorded in 1663 in Spanish Town, granted by King Charles II to Hercie Barrett for services to the king.

Hercie Barrett was an officer under Admiral William Penn and General Robert Venables who led the failed invasion of Hispaniola. They then turned their sights on Jamaica, which was much less fortified, and successfully wrested it from Spanish control for the King of England.

The first Barretts became an extremely wealthy and influential English family in Jamaica, owning more than 84,000 acres of land and 2,000 slaves in the parishes of Trelawny and St James. The original family home was Cinnamon Hill Great House in St James. The construction was started by Samuel Barrett, who died before its completion. It was completed by his son Edward, and it is Edward's generation of Barretts and their children that became among Jamaica's wealthiest and most influential planters and politicians. Elizabeth Barrett Browning was the daughter of Edward Moulton Barrett.

The Greenwood Great House was also a Barrett family home, built by Richard Barrett, the Speaker of the Assembly. It was one of several great houses owned by the Barrett family, including Cinnamon Hill located nearby and Barrett Hall, which no longer exists. Cinnamon Hill was bought by Johnny Cash, the country-and-western singer, whose home it was until his death. The Greenwood Great House still stands today. It was spared from torching during the slave rebellions, primarily because of the way Richard Barrett treated his slaves. Richard was chosen to represent the Jamaica legislature before parliament on the issues of emancipation. Anne Chambers in her biography of his opponent, the Governor, The Second Marquess of Sligo states that he was completely opposed to the abolition of slavery.

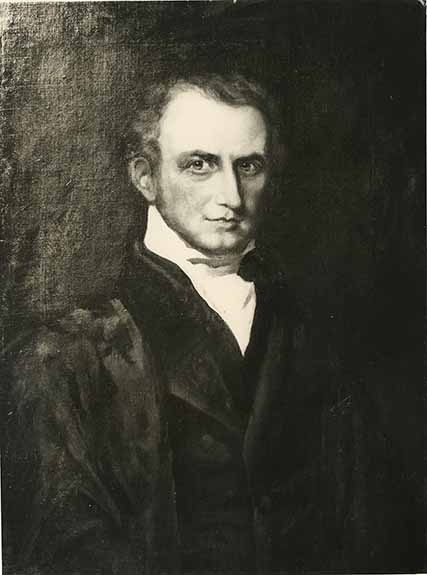
The Hon. Richard Barrett Speaker of the Jamaican House of Assembly

However, in the 1850s, Richard Barrett published a poem The Negro Appeal to her White Sisters, in an attempt to establish sisterhood between white women and Afro-Jamaican women to work together to end slavery. It is therefore probable that Richard Barrett supported the abolition of slavery.

== See also ==
- Aston Barrett – musician
- Carlton Barrett – musician
- Elizabeth Barrett – poet
- Lindsay Barrett – writer
- Sarah Barrett Moulton: "Pinkie" – subject of a portrait by Thomas Lawrence
