= Howard University Press =

Former publishing imprint of Howard University, Washington, D.C.

Howard University Press (HUP) was the publishing arm of Howard University. Founded in 1972, HUP was the first black university press in the US. Its first chief executive, Charles F. Harris, published about 100 titles under the imprint before going on to found Amistad Press in 1986.

Books published by HUP included A Poetic Equation: Conversations Between Nikki Giovanni and Margaret Walker in 1974, with other titles that year including Song for Mumu by Lindsay Barrett, and Quality Education For All Americans by William Brazziel; The Wayward and the Seeking: A Collection of Writing by Jean Toomer (1980); and the American edition of How Europe Underdeveloped Africa (1974). The press closed in 2011, and a majority of its titles were to be acquired by Black Classic Press (BCP).

In October 2011, Black Classic Press announced that despite HUP announcing the transfer of its titles and contracts to Black Classic Press in May 2011, the agreement was cancelled by Black Classic Press in October due to a lack of communication from Howard University representatives and their failure to return a signed agreement to BCP.

== See also ==
- List of English-language book publishing companies
- List of university presses
- African-American book publishers in the United States, 1960–80
