= Sybil Ward =

American lawyer

- Born: June 24, 1894; Wilmington, Delaware
- Died: March 31, 1977 (aged 82); Wilmington
- Occupation: lawyer

Sybil Ursula Ward (June 24, 1894 – March 31, 1977) was one of the first female lawyers in Delaware.

Ward was born on June 24, 1894, in Wilmington, Delaware. She was born into a family of lawyers, as her father Herbert H. Ward was an attorney. She had attended the Wheaton College in Massachusetts and completed her legal education at the University of Pennsylvania Law School. In 1923, she and Evangelyn Barsky were the first women admitted to practice law in Delaware. Ward then practiced with her father at the law firm Ward & Gray. She would go on to become the first female to serve on the Wilmington City Council.

She died on March 31, 1977, in Wilmington.

== See also ==
- List of first women lawyers and judges in Delaware
