= William Brazziel =

American educational scholar (1926–2010)

- Born: William Ferris Brazziel Jr. February 5, 1926; Munford, Tennessee, U.S.
- Died: November 21, 2010 (aged 84); Mansfield Center, Connecticut, U.S.
- Education: Ohio State University
- Scientific career
- Fields: Education
- Institutions: Norfolk State University; University of Connecticut
- Thesis: Instruction in agriculture in non-land-grant colleges in the United States (1956)
- Doctoral advisor: Ralph E. Bender

William Ferris Brazziel Jr. (February 5, 1926 – November 21, 2010) was an African-American educational scholar. He was a professor of higher education in the Neag School of Education at the University of Connecticut for twenty-seven years until his retirement in 1996. Before joining the University of Connecticut, he served as director of general studies at Norfolk State University.

Brazziel, one of nine children born to William Farris Brazziel Sr. and Odis Isom Brazziel, served in the U.S. Marine Corps during the Second World War, stationed in the Asiatic Pacific Area: New Caledonia and the Solomon Islands. He earned a Ph.D. in Higher Education and Administration from Ohio State University, with a 1956 thesis titled "Instruction in agriculture in non-land-grant colleges in the United States".

He was the author of Quality Education For All Americans (among the first titles published by Howard University Press in 1974), and co-authored the book Shaping Higher Education's Future.

Brazziel died at home, aged 84, on November 21, 2010, after a long illness, survived by his wife of 54 years, Marian Edmondson Brazziel, and their son Dominique.
