= Addison Gayle =

American professor and author

Addison Gayle, Jr. (June 2, 1932 – October 3, 1991) was an American professor, literary critic, and author in New York City. He advocated for a Black aesthetic.

== Biography ==
Gayle was born in Newport News, Virginia. He graduated from the City College of New York in 1965 with a B.A. and received an M.A. in English from UCLA a year later. In the summer of 1966, Gayle was hired by City College SEEK Director and Psychology Professor Leslie Berger as an English Lecturer at City College (together with Toni Cade Bambara and Barbara Christian) to teach in the City University of New York's SEEK affirmative action desegregation program. By 1971, Gayle left City College to be an assistant professor at Bernard M. Baruch College where he taught until his death in October 1991.

He wrote that a Black aesthetic can be "a means of helping Black people out of the polluted mainstream of Americanism".

Gayle edited Black Expression: Essays by and about Black Americans in the Creative Arts published by Weybright & Talley in 1969 and Bondage, Freedom and Beyond: The Prose of Black America, published by Doubleday in Garden City, New York, 1970.

On September 12, 1965, Gayle married Rosalie Norwood, who was a lecturer at University of California, Los Angeles, when they met. They divorced in 1971.

== Bibliography ==
- The Black Situation (1970)
- The Black aesthetic (1971)
- Oak and Ivy: A Biography of Paul Laurence Dunbar (1971)
- Bondage, Freedom, and Beyond (1971)
- Claude McKay: The Black Poet at War (1972)
- The way of the new world (1975)
- Richard Wright: Ordeal of a Native Son
- Wayward Child: A Personal Odyssey (1977)
