= Sterling Allen Brown =

American poet and academic (1901–1989)

- Born: May 1, 1901; Washington D.C., U.S.
- Died: January 13, 1989 (aged 87); Takoma Park, Maryland, U.S.
- Education: Williams College (BA); Harvard University (MA)
- Occupations: Writer, poet, professor
- Spouse: Daisy Turnbull (m. 1927)

Sterling Allen Brown (May 1, 1901 – January 13, 1989) was an American professor, folklorist, poet, and literary critic. He chiefly studied black culture of the southern United States and was a professor at Howard University for most of his career. Brown was the first poet laureate of the District of Columbia.

== Early life and education ==
Brown was born May 1, 1901, on the campus of Howard University in Washington, D.C., where his father, Sterling Nelson Brown, a former slave, was a prominent minister and professor at Howard University Divinity School. His mother Grace Adelaide Brown, who had been the valedictorian of her class at Fisk University, taught in D.C. public schools for more than 50 years. Both his parents grew up in Tennessee and often shared stories with Brown and his sister Mary Edna Brown (a founder of Delta Sigma Theta sorority) about famous leaders such as Frederick Douglass and Booker T. Washington.

Brown's early childhood was spent on a farm on Whiskey Bottom Road in Howard County, Maryland. He was educated at Waterford Oaks Elementary and Dunbar High School, where he graduated as the top student. He received a scholarship to attend Williams College in Massachusetts. After graduating from Williams Phi Beta Kappa in 1922, he continued his studies at Harvard University, receiving an MA in English a year later. That same year of 1923, he was hired as an English lecturer at Virginia Theological Seminary and College in Lynchburg, Virginia, a position he held for the next three years. He never pursued a doctorate degree, but several colleges gave him honorary doctorates. Brown won the Graves Prize for his essay "The Comic Spirit in Shakespeare and Molière" during his senior year at Williams. Brown was a member of the Omega Psi Phi fraternity.

== Marriage and family ==
Brown married Daisy Turnbull in 1927 and they adopted a son, Johnathon L. Dennis. Daisy was an occasional muse for Brown; his poems "Long Track Blues" and "Against That Day" were inspired by her.

== Academic career ==
Brown began his teaching career with positions at several universities, including Lincoln University and Fisk University, before returning to Howard in 1929. He was a professor there for 40 years. Brown's poetry used the South for its setting and chronicled the experiences of enslaved African-American people. In his creative work, Brown often imitated southern African-American speech, using "variant spellings and apostrophes to mark dropped consonants". He taught and wrote about African-American literature and folklore. He was a pioneer in the appreciation of this genre. He had an "active, imaginative mind" when writing and "a natural gift for dialogue, description and narration".

Brown was known for introducing his students to concepts in jazz, which, along with blues, spirituals and other forms of black music, formed an integral component of his poetry. He was a speaker at the famous From Spirituals to Swing concerts, and his introduction can be heard on the recordings made of the performances.

In addition to his career at Howard University, Brown served as a visiting professor at Vassar College, New York University, Atlanta University, and Yale University. Revered as the Dean of African American literature, some of his notable students include Toni Morrison, Kwame Ture (a.k.a. Stokely Carmichael), Kwame Nkrumah, Thomas Sowell, Ossie Davis, and Amiri Baraka (a.k.a. LeRoi Jones).

In 1969, Brown retired from his faculty position at Howard and turned full-time to poetry.

== Literary career ==
In 1932, Brown published his first book of poetry Southern Road. It was a collection of poems, many with rural themes, and treated the simple lives of poor, black, country folk with poignancy and dignity. Brown's work included pieces of authentic dialect and structures as well as formal work. Despite the success of this book, he struggled to find a publisher for the follow-up, No Hiding Place.

His poetic work was influenced in content, form and cadence by African-American music, including work songs, blues and jazz. Like that of Jean Toomer, Zora Neale Hurston, Langston Hughes and other black writers of the period, his work often dealt with race and class in the United States. He was deeply interested in a folk-based culture, which he considered most authentic. Brown is considered part of the Harlem Renaissance artistic tradition, although he spent the majority of his life in the Brookland neighborhood of Northeast Washington, D.C.

== Civil rights work ==
As a member of the fight for racial equality, Brown stuck to the belief that "the pen is mightier than the sword". As a member of the National Association for the Advancement of Colored People (NAACP), Brown served on the organization's advisory board and worked with other notable Harlem Renaissance writers, including W. E. B. Du Bois, James Weldon Johnson, Langston Hughes, and Walter White.

In his work, Brown explores topics including the unethical restrictions of Jim Crow laws, the inferiority of public schools serving black communities, and the political and social activities of black churches. Working tirelessly in the fight for racial equality, Brown used his platform as a journalist to include his own personal commentaries that appealed to the conscience of white America in the face of a spreading democracy. One quote from Brown exemplifies his stance in the fight for racial equality: "If America is to indoctrinate the rest of the world with democracy, it is logical to expect that the American Negro will share it at home.… [S]egregation must be abolished before there will be true democracy at home."

== Honors ==
In 1979, the District of Columbia declared May 1, his birthday, Sterling A. Brown Day.

His Collected Poems won the Lenore Marshall Poetry Prize in the early 1980s for the best collection of poetry published that year.

In 1982, the City College of New York awarded him the Langston Hughes Medal.

In 1984, the District of Columbia named him its first poet laureate, a position he held until his death from leukemia at the age of 88.

The Friends of Libraries USA in 1997 named Founders Hall at Howard University a Literary Landmark, the first so designated in Washington, DC.

The home where Brown resided is located in the Brookland section of northeast Washington, DC. An engraved plaque and a sign created by the DC Commission on the Arts and Humanities are featured in front of the house.

== Works ==
- Outline for the study of the poetry of American Negroes, 1931 (literary criticism)
- Southern Road, Harcourt, Brace and Company, 1932 (original poetry)
- The Negro in American Fiction, Bronze booklet - no. 6 (1937), published by The Associates in Negro Folk Education (Washington, D.C.)
- Negro Poetry and Drama: and the Negro in American fiction, Bronze booklet no. 7 (1937), published by The Associates in Negro Folk Education (Washington, D.C.)
- The Negro Caravan, 1941, co-editor with Arthur P. Davis and Ulysses Lee (anthology of African-American literature)
- The Last Ride of Wild Bill (poetry)
- Michael S. Harper, ed. (1996). The Collected Poems of Sterling A. Brown. Northwestern University Press. ISBN 978-0-8101-5045-4. (1st edition 1980)
- The Poetry of Sterling Brown, recorded 1946–1973, released on Smithsonian Folkways, 1995
- Mark A. Sanders, ed. (1996). A son's return: selected essays of Sterling A. Brown. UPNE. ISBN 978-1-55553-275-8.
- Old Lem (Poem)

"Old Lem" was put to music by Carla Olson with the permission of Sterling Brown's estate. The resulting song is called "Justice" and was recorded by Olson, backed by former member of The Rolling Stones Mick Taylor and former member of the Faces Ian McLagan along Jesse Sublett on bass and Rick Hemmert on drums.
