= Arthur P. Davis =

American university professor, literary scholar, writer and editor

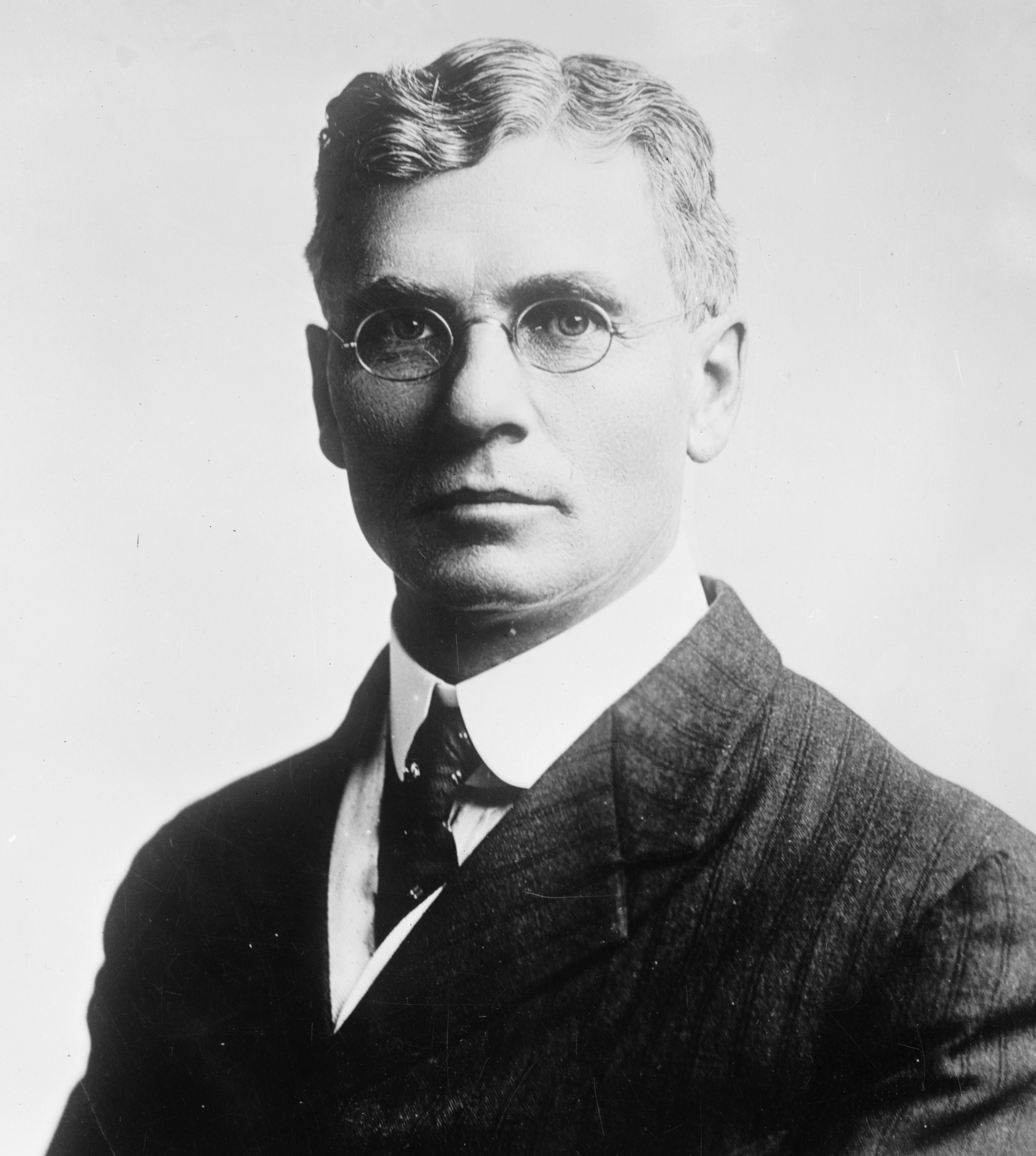
- Born: Arthur Paul Davis; November 21, 1904
- Died: April 21, 1996 (aged 91)
- Occupations: University teacher; literary scholar; author; editor
- Notable work: The Negro Caravan; The New Cavalcade; From the Dark Tower: Afro-American Writers 1900–1960

Arthur Paul Davis (November 21, 1904 – April 21, 1996) was an influential American university professor, literary scholar, and the writer and editor of several important critical texts such as The Negro Caravan, The New Cavalcade, and From the Dark Tower: Afro-American Writers 1900–1960. He was African-American. Influenced by the Harlem Renaissance, Davis has inspired many African-Americans to pursue literature and the arts.

== Early life and education ==
Arthur P. Davis was born on November 21, 1904, in Hampton, Virginia. He was raised by his parents, Frances Nash Davis and Andrew Davis along with his eight brothers. In an autobiographical essay entitled "Columbia-College and Renaissance Harlem-Autobiographical Essay", Davis describes his father, who worked as a plasterer, as an authoritarian figure, "a Victorian head-of-the-house but also an excellent parent." Although Davis was a gifted grammar school student, he was also required to help contribute to the family household during the summers by working at a black resort on the Chesapeake Bay.

After graduating from Hampton Normal and Agricultural Institute in 1922, Davis spent a year attending Howard University in Washington, D.C., where he then transferred to Columbia College in New York City. As the first integrated school that he attended, Davis recalled the oppressive responsibility of the move in his autobiographical essay "Columbia College and Renaissance Harlem":

I felt that the whole 'race' rode on my poor weak shoulders, that somehow if I failed, I would be letting down all Negroes. Many Negroes of my generation assumed that attitude when they attended Northern white schools. It helped to make us more competitive.

Despite having a scholarship, Davis boarded with a family in Harlem and needed to earn money for his room and board. Davis sought work from city politician Charlie Anderson (who was married to Davis's cousin, Emma Anderson), as well as from a close associate of Booker T. Washington, Davis was only able to acquire menial jobs such as a late night apartment-house elevator boy and an unsuccessful stint as a houseboy in a Park Avenue mansion. However, in his second year, Davis was able to find a job as a counselor with the Children's Aid Society on East 127th Street thanks to a Hampton connection. Davis looks back on this experience stating, "As an undergraduate I naturally did not fully understand the significance of the events happening around me, but I did get the feel of the times."

Davis attended Columbia during the most active years of the Harlem Renaissance. "I had a ringside seat", he recalled in his "Columbia College and Renaissance Harlem" essay, "on the events of those stirring and exhilarating years it was bliss to be alive in those days."

== Career ==
Davis graduated as a Phi Beta Kappa from Columbia College in 1927, which made him only the second black student to receive this honor. He received his master's degree from Columbia in 1929 although he had already begun his academic career elsewhere. Between 1927 and 1928 Davis was an instructor in the English department of North Carolina College, which is now known as North Carolina Central University. He then transferred to Virginia Union University in 1929, where he worked as an English professor until 1944.

Davis states, "Harlem was a Nigger Heaven to my provincial eyes; and there were thousands of other migrants like me who felt the charm of the black ghetto." Davis saw or met many of the creative celebrities of the day. Including James Weldon Johnson, Wallace Thurman, Paul Robeson, Richard Bruce Nugent, Ethel Waters, and Bill "Bojangles" Robinson, as well as important political and intellectual figures like Marcus Garvey and W. E. B. Du Bois. He also met the important writer during the Harlem Renaissance and editor of The New Negro Alain Locke. Blues singer Bessie Smith, a famous singer, lived across an air shaft from Davis' for a short time on 133rd Street. He was more interested in her earthly and racy conversations than her singing.

Arthur Davis became the first black American to receive a PhD in English in 18th-century English literature from Columbia University in 1942. He began teaching at Howard University in 1944. This was the institute that Davis was most associated with. He was an English professor at Howard until 1969, which he then was appointed professor emeritus. In 1984, the university awarded him an honorary doctorate in literature.

At Howard, Davis' mission as an educator and academic writer became clear. He was inspired by the Harlem Renaissance heroes that he had met in New York City. Davis was also influenced by powerful orators like Garvey. In Davis' essay "Columbia College and Renaissance Harlem", he recalled that he and his friends "were impressed in spite of ourselves by the emphasis he put on pride in race, pride in blackness. It touched us and unconsciously influenced the thinking and writing" of many of the poets of their generation.

The spirit of the Harlem Renaissance was on Davis' agenda for the rest of his career. He made his focus as a teacher and critic on the work of black American writers. In his first ten years at Howard, Davis became a prolific advocate of black literary endeavors, publishing at least 34 articles, reviews, and miscellaneous critical works.

== Work on The Negro Caravan ==
Co-written by Sterling Brown, Arthur P. Davis, and Ulysses Lee, The Negro Caravan sought to "present a body of artistically valid writings by American Negro authors, to present a truthful mosaic of Negro character and experience in America, and to collect in one volume certain key literary works that have greatly influenced the thinking of American Negroes, and to a lesser degree, that of Americans as a whole." Davis was the respective co-editor in many of the publishings.

== Work on Cavalcade ==
Co-written with J. Saunders Redding, Davis states the purpose of the anthology was to "provide a representative selection of as much as possible of the best prose and poetry written by Negro Americans since 1760." Davis co-edited much of the anthology and provided his personal perspective on the New Negro Renaissance in Harlem. The anthology references and critiques various literary works from important Harlem figures such as Zora Neale Hurston, Langston Hughes, Claude McKay, Sterling Brown and Alain LeRoy Locke.

== Work on From the Dark Tower ==
Written by Davis, the purpose of From the Dark Tower: Afro-American Writers 1900–1960 was to cover important African American writers from 1900 to 1960 with an emphasis on writers from the Harlem Renaissance. The work on From the Dark Tower is meant to be a continuation of The Negro Author published in 1931 by Vernon Loggins. Similar to his work on Cavalcade, Davis states that "this volume has been designed to serve as a supplementary text or reference book for courses in Negro American literature or black studies It will be found, I hope, particularly helpful as a central text for classes using a list of selected authors in paperback."

== Work on The Negro College Student ==
The function of The Negro College Student, written by Davis, is an article from The Crisis magazine that criticizes and praises the Negro college student of the 1930s. Davis notes that education rates for the Negro have skyrocketed after the World War I. Within the text Davis compares the faults and excellence's of the Negro student of that time. Regarding Negroes in higher education: The author argues there are more negative academic qualities than positive. He begins the article by denoting the present status of Negro college student which concludes Negro students are lackadaisical and have no initiative when it comes to scholarly work. As he further criticizes the Negro student in higher education, he implies the Negro's "pure love of scholarship is almost unknown".

Contrarily, Davis praises the Negro student's excellence's by acknowledging the new spirit of independence that began to emerge. The author implies the Negro student knows how to think for himself. Davis reminds the Negro college student that he must remember the opportunity to obtain a higher education is not one to be taken for granted; those that came before him fought and died for this right. Therefore, as Davis concludes, he challenges the Negro student to take responsibility and continue the legacy of black scholarship that was laid before him by his ancestors.

== Awards and later life ==
Proudfit fellow, Columbia University, 1937; National Hampton Alumni Award, 1947; award from Howard University's Institute for the Arts and Humanities, 1973; award from College Language Association for distinguished contribution to literary scholarship, 1975; Distinguished Critic Award, Middle Atlantic Writers Association, 1982; honorary doctorate in literature, Howard University, 1984. Davis received a number of awards and accolades throughout his academic career, including a 1975 award from the College Language Association for distinguished contribution to literary scholarship, a Distinguished Critic award from the Middle Atlantic Writers Association in 1982, and a Martin Luther King Jr. Leadership Award from the D.C. Public Library in 1992. Davis retired from Howard University in 1980. He died sixteen years later of cardiopulmonary arrest at the age of 91 years on April 21, 1996, in Washington, D.C.

The Arthur P. Davis Papers archival collection is housed at the Moorland Spingarn Research Center at Howard University in Washington, D.C. The collection contains photographs, correspondence, and articles written by and about Davis. Davis's writings include articles published in The Crisis, Phylon, and the Promethean. Copies of Negro Digest, Fire!!, Oracle, and The Journal of Negro History are housed in his collection. There is an abundance of personal and professional correspondence including letters from Langston Hughes, W. E. B. Du Bois and Sterling Brown. Versions of Davis's published and unpublished short stories are also available in the collection.
