= Margaret Cezair-Thompson =

Jamaican writer

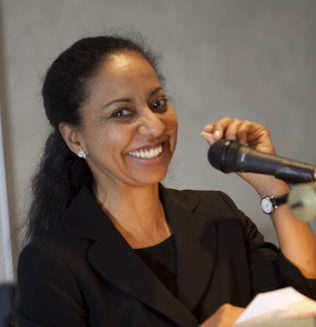
Margaret Cezair-Thompson

Margaret Cezair-Thompson is a Jamaican writer and a professor of literature and creative writing at Wellesley College.

== Early life and education ==
Margaret Cezair-Thompson was born and raised in Kingston, Jamaica, where she attended Saint Andrew's High School for Girls. She is the daughter of Dudley Thompson, noted Jamaican barrister QC, who served as a Jamaican Government Minister and then as a diplomat (Ambassador-at- Large to Africa, stationed in Nigeria) and Genevieve Cezair-Thompson. Cezair-Thompson acknowledges her father's influence in her work: "My father's life spanned almost a century of Caribbean and African Pan-Africanist history. Growing up listening to his many first-hand accounts of great events and people influenced me enormously." He met her mother, Genevieve, in Manchester, England, around the time of the Fifth Pan-African Congress. Cezair-Thompson's maternal grandfather, Dr. Hubert Cezair, was a Trinidadian doctor who practiced medicine in Manchester, England. Margaret Cezair-Thompson left Jamaica to study English literature, Drama, and Creative Writing at Barnard College (where she was mentored by Marjorie Housepian Dobkin). She then went on to complete her PhD at the Graduate Center of the City University of New York where she wrote her dissertation on Trinidadian writer V. S. Naipaul with the help of legendary American critic Alfred Kazin. Although she has lived outside Jamaica for many years, Cezair-Thompson retains strong ties to her native country. Like many characters in her novels, she was a child when Jamaica became an independent nation in 1962, and she has witnessed the country's changes. She currently lives in Massachusetts where she continues to work and write.

== Literary style ==
Her work has been compared to that of William Faulkner, George Lamming and Jamaica Kincaid. Among the themes in her work is the individual quest for place and identity within the tumult of history. She is not only interested in Jamaica's history but how Jamaica's history connects to history at large: "Growing up as a child in Jamaica, it never seemed as though my history was in any way connected to the great moments in European history except when it came to talking about slavery, but now I'm seeing all the ways in which [formerly marginalized] areas were very much players in world events and bigger history." She feels part of a growing tradition of post-colonial writers "very much claiming back their part in a bigger history." Many critics also praise Cezair-Thompson's ability to evoke the "genuine essence of Jamaica" in her descriptions of the Jamaican landscape, flora and culture.

The writers (and books) of special interest to Cezair-Thompson include Virginia Woolf, Paule Marshall, Toni Morrison, Chinua Achebe, Ben Okri, Jean Rhys, William Shakespeare, James Joyce (Dubliners), Joseph Conrad (Heart of Darkness), William Butler Yeats, and Derek Walcott

== Publications and awards ==
The True History of Paradise, Cezair-Thompson's first novel, follows Jean Landing on a drive across the mountains as she attempts to flee Jamaica for the United States. During the ride, she recalls memories of her own fractured past as she notes the increasingly violent confrontations between political factions of her island nation:

"Ghosts stand on the foothills of this journey. She smells their woody ancestral breath in the land's familiar crests and undulations. She has heard them all her life, these obstinate spirits, desperate to speak, to revise the broken grammar of their exits. They speak to her, Jean Landing, born in that audient hour before daylight broke on the nation, born into the knowledge of nation and prenation, the old noises of barracks, slave quarters, and steerage mingling in her ears with the newest sounds of self-rule. On verandas, in kitchens, in the old talk, in her waking reveries and anxious dreams, she has heard their stories."

The True History of Paradise was shortlisted for the International Dublin Literary Award in 2000.

Cezair-Thompson's second novel, The Pirate's Daughter, focuses more on pre-independent Jamaica, including the years that the famous swashbuckler, Errol Flynn, lived there. The novel, which imagines an affair between the star and a beautiful local, Ida, is a coming-of-age story not only of the female protagonist but of the island itself, and it subtly explores the legacies of colonialism. As one reviewer wrote, "Jamaica feels like another character in the book." Cezair-Thompson once described her choice of subject for The Pirate's Daughter, saying: "My mother told me how women in Jamaica fainted when they saw Flynn because he was so handsome. That story amused and fascinated me as a child without my realizing why. Now I think it's something to do with the impact of two very different worlds colliding: glamorous, mesmerizing Hollywood and small Jamaica which was still a colony at the time and more susceptible to outside influence." Focusing on the transitional period of Jamaica in the 1940s and 1950s, immediately preceding independence, in which physical and psychological manifestations of a British colony still prevailed, The Pirate's Daughter won the Essence Literary Award for Fiction in 2008, People Critic's #1 Choice in 2007, and the ABA Book Sense #1 Pick for October 2007. It was also on the London Sunday Times best-seller list and a Richard & Judy summer pick. It has been translated into seven different languages.

- The Pirate's Daughter (Random House, 2008)
- "Boat Man," Blue Latitudes, Caribbean Women Writers at Home and Abroad (Seal Press, 2005); first published in Callaloo: Journal of African-American and African Arts & Letters 16.2 (1993)
- "Geography Lessons," Washington Post Sunday Magazine (1999)
- The True History of Paradise (Dutton/Plume, 1999)
- (Articles including, "Beyond the Postcolonial Novel: The 'Road' to Ben Okri's The Famished Road and its 'Abiku' Traveler," Journal of Literature 31:2 (1996)“The Blank Spaces of Heart of Darkness,” Conradiana, Vol.48. 2017;“History, Fiction, and the Myth of Marginality.” Small Axe Salon, Columbia University Press.) Photo Finish, screenplay sold to Harpo-Disney (1994)
