= Eugene Winslow =

American businessman and artist (1919–2001)

- Born: November 17, 1919; Dayton, Ohio, US
- Died: July 7, 2001
- Education: Dillard University; School of the Art Institute of Chicago
- Notable credit(s): Great Negroes Past and Present (illustrator)

Eugene Winslow (November 17, 1919 – July 7, 2001) was an American artist, illustrator, businessman and publisher. He co-founded Afro-Am Publishing in Chicago, Illinois. In 2000, the DuSable Museum of African-American History honored him as one of seven black design pioneers in Chicago.

== Early life and education ==
Eugene Winslow was born on November 17, 1919, in Dayton, Ohio. Both of his parents were college graduates who encouraged all seven of their children to pursue education and the arts. Winslow attended Froebel High School in Gary, Indiana, and then received a Bachelor of Arts degree from Dillard University in New Orleans in 1943. After graduating from Dillard, Winslow entered the 477th Bomber Group of the Air Force, making him a member of the Tuskegee Airmen. He attained the rank of Second Lieutenant. He later served in the Air Force Reserve, becoming a First Lieutenant before he left in 1957. After the War, Winslow's lifelong interest in art drew him to do post-graduate work at the Art Institute of Chicago and the Institute of Design at the Illinois Institute of Technology in Chicago. He studied at these institutions concurrently from 1948 to 1951.

Throughout his early career, Winslow supplemented the income from his art by teaching and working as a newspaper cartoonist, advertising designer, and engineering draftsman.

== Afro-Am Publishing ==
In 1963, Winslow joined two friends to start Afro-Am Publishing where he was able to create his own projects. David P. Ross, a graduate of the Art Institute of Chicago, became Afro-Am's president. Winslow was treasurer and, later, vice president.

Also in 1963, as a part of the celebration of the emancipation centennial, Afro-Am published Great Negroes Past and Present, which Winslow illustrated. The book was an immediate success and became the pioneer supplementary text for Black Studies programs for students. By 1972, the book was in its third edition and had been adopted by the Board of Education for Social Studies in California.

In 1978, Winslow was nominated to serve as president for Afro-Am Publishing. As company president, Winslow changed Afro-Am's marketing strategy from direct selling to a mail-order operation utilizing a catalog of hundreds of black interest educational materials. He directed his catalog sales to educators, schools, and libraries. Winslow wrote Afro-Americans '76: Black Americans in the Founding of Our Nation and contributed to several works about African-American history while serving as Afro-Am's president. He sold the publishing company in 1993 and died in 2001.

== Archival collection ==
The Eugene Winslow Papers (1851–1994) are located at the Chicago Public Library's Vivian G. Harsh Research Collection in Chicago, Illinois. They consist of materials related to Eugene Winslow's professional life as an artist and in publishing as the Vice President of the Afro-Am Publishing Company. The collection includes newspaper and journal articles, photographs, Winslow's sketches, and his drafts of biographical summaries for Great Negroes Past and Present. The collection also includes a small amount of material related to Winslow's personal life, his other writings, and family photographs.

Eugene Winslow Papers (1885-1993) are located at the University of Illinois at Chicago. They include correspondence, memoranda, notes, clippings, certificates, programs, photographs, brochures, sketches, graphic designs, schematics, and published works.

Media

Eugene Winslow was used as inspiration for Estelle Winslow's husband, Sam Winslow from Family Matters Season 3, Episode 16 'Brown Bombshell'. Estelle wants to share the stories of her late fighter-pilot husband and World War II's Tuskegee Airmen with her family, but nobody is interested. She decides that Eddie's American history class may be more willing to listen (particularly Eddie, after he sees how cool his grandfather was).
