= The Negro Caravan =

1941 literary anthology

- Publication date: 1941

The Negro Caravan is a collection of writings by African Americans edited by Sterling Allen Brown, Arthur Paul Davis, and Ulysses Lee. It was published in 1941. A writeup in the New York Times states it achieved "legend" status. It was published by Dryden Press. The book includes short stories, excerpts from novels, poetry, folk literature, drama, speeches, pamphlets, letters, biography, and essays organized chronologically by genre. It also includes biographical sketches of the writers.

Reviewer Harvey Curtis Webster noted, "The pleasure of reading The Negro Caravan is hardly undermined by the fact that one emerges a more enlightened human being." In her newspaper column My Day, Eleanor Roosevelt wrote that The Negro Caravan "should be in everyone's library."
