= Middle Atlantic Writers Association =

The Middle-Atlantic Writers Association (MAWA) is a non-profit organization made up of creative writers, scholars, critics, and literature enthusiasts. Founded in 1982, MAWA aims to preserve, perpetuate and study the literary traditions of the Middle-Atlantic region, with a specific focus on the literature of African Americans, the Black Diaspora, women and the multicultural, global community. MAWA aims (1) to provide a forum and publishing outlet for blossoming and established writers from the region and (2) to generate scholarship about writers and subjects from the region, as well as other neglected aspects of literature.
