= Robert Kirsch =

American literary critic and author

Robert R. Kirsch
- Born: October 18, 1922; Coney Island, Brooklyn, New York City, U.S.
- Died: August 16, 1980 (aged 57); Santa Barbara, California, U.S.
- Occupation(s): Literary critic, author
- Employer: The Los Angeles Times

Robert R. Kirsch (October 18, 1922 – August 16, 1980) was an American literary critic and author. He was the literary editor of The Los Angeles Times for more than two decades.

== Early life ==
Robert R. Kirsch was born on October 18, 1922, on Coney Island in Brooklyn, New York City. He moved out of Coney Island at the age of 17. He had two sons, Paul Kirsch, and Jonathan Kirsch, who is a renowned lawyer. He also later had a daughter named Maria Kirsch in his second marriage.

== Career ==
Kirsch joined The Los Angeles Times, where he was the literary editor for 23 years. Over the course of his career, he wrote "thousands of columns, book reviews, and essays." He was one of the first critics to praise the works of Joseph Wambaugh and Tom Sanchez.

Kirsch authored several books about California and Las Vegas. He used the pennames of Robert Dundee and Robert Bancroft.

== Death and legacy ==
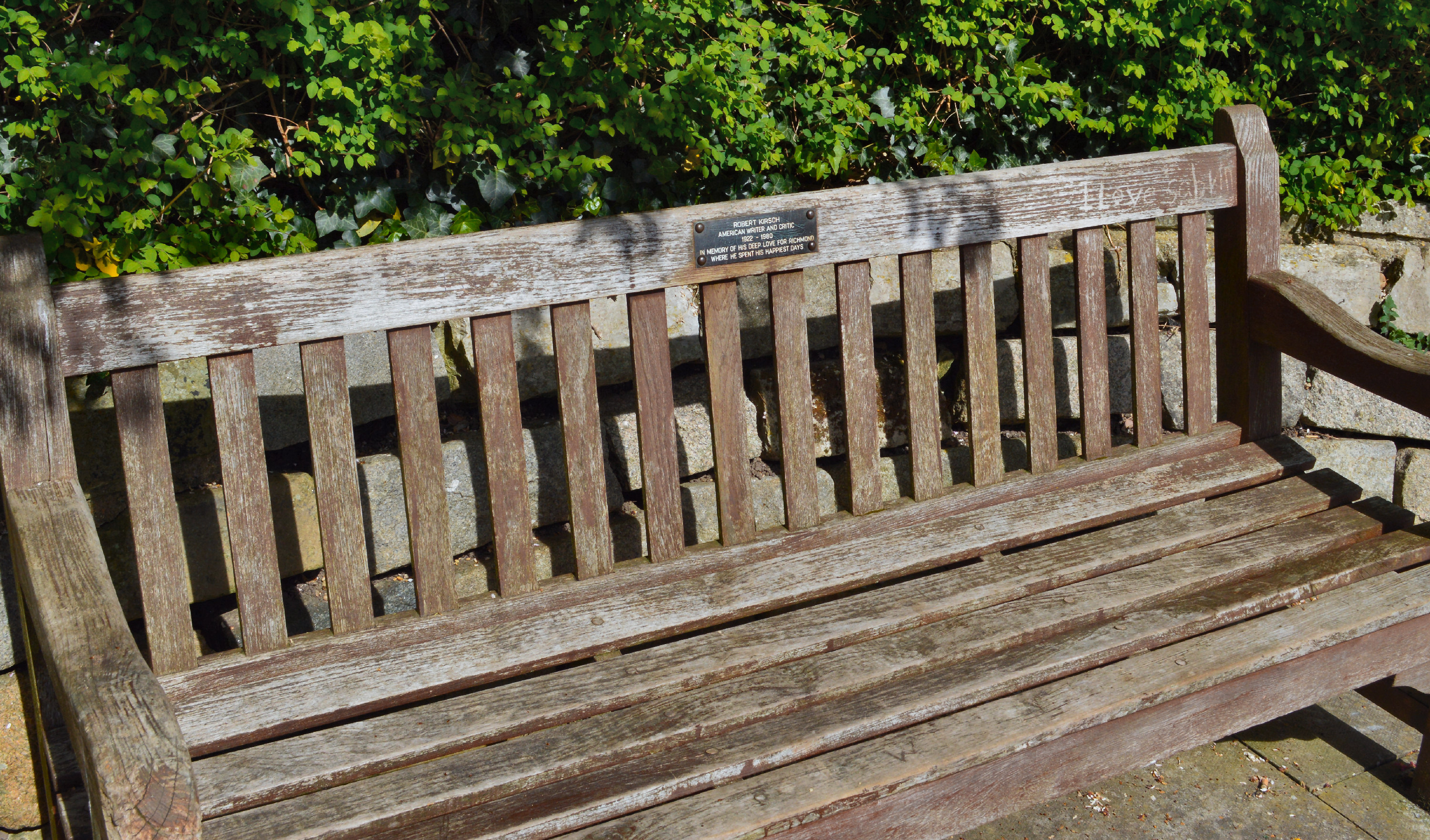
Robert Kirsch's memorial bench, Terrace Gardens, Richmond Hill, London

Kirsch died of cancer on August 16, 1980, in Santa Barbara, California. A public funeral was held in the chapel of the American Jewish University in Bel Air. He is the namesake of the Los Angeles Times Book Prize's Robert Kirsch Award for Lifetime Achievement.

== Selected works ==
- In the Wrong Rain (1959)
- Madeleine Austrian (1960)
- The Wars of Pardon (1965)
- West of the West: Witnesses to the California Experience, 1542-1906; The Story of California from the Conquistadores to the Great Earthquake (1967)
- Lives, Works, & Transformations: A Quarter Century of Book Reviews and Essays (1978)
- Casino: A Novel of Las Vegas (1979)
