= Charles F. Harris =

American book publisher and editor (1934–2015)

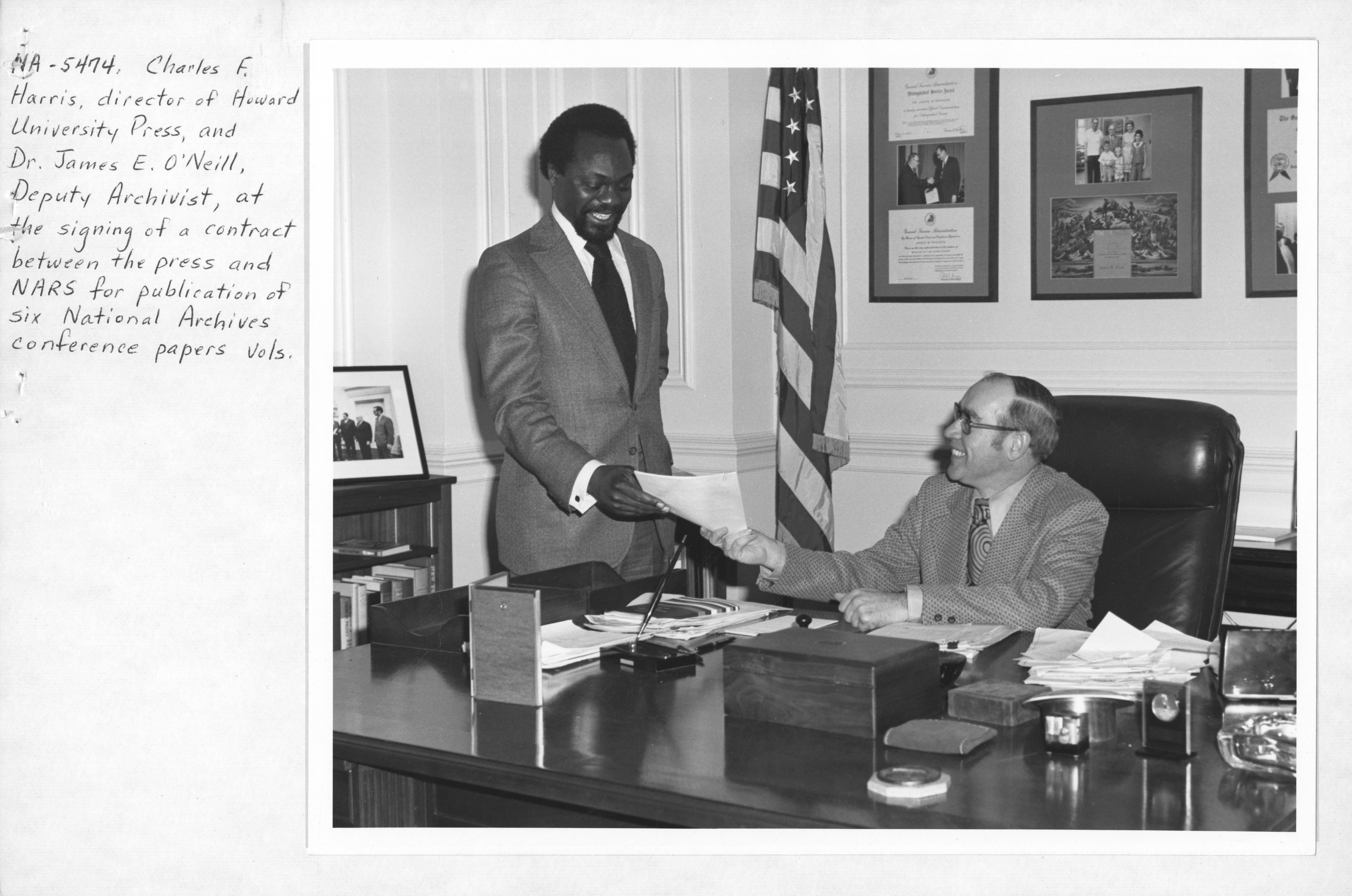
- Born: Charles Frederick Harris; January 3, 1934; Portsmouth, Virginia, U.S.
- Died: December 16, 2015 (aged 81); Manhattan, New York, U.S.
- Education: Virginia State University
- Occupations: Book publisher and editor
- Known for: Founder of Amistad Press

Charles F. Harris (January 3, 1934 – December 16, 2015) was an American book publisher and editor. Through his pioneering work at Howard University Press and at Amistad Press, which he founded in 1986, Harris was instrumental in the publication of many books by notable African-American writers.

== Biography ==
The youngest of the seven children of Annie Eula (née Lawson) and Ambrose Harris, Charles Frederick Harris was born on January 3, 1934, in Portsmouth, Virginia. While in elementary school, he earned pocket money by delivering newspapers to the community, at the same time following his father's stipulation that he read everything he delivered. Harris studied at Virginia State University, graduating in 1955 with a B.A. degree.

He subsequently served in the Infantry of the United States Army, and rose to the rank of first lieutenant by the time he received an Honorable Discharge.

Harris began a career in publishing at Doubleday in the mid-1950s, a time when (as The New York Times observed) "the prevailing notion in the book business was that, with few exceptions, writing by black authors or aimed at black readers belonged to a niche market that was at worst inconsequential and at best narrow and unprofitable." Counteracting that view in the publishing industry was where Harris focused much of his career. At Doubleday, he launched the Zenith Book Series, which focused on African-American history for elementary and high school students, and published titles by authors including John Hope Franklin and Rayford Logan.

In 1967, Harris became a senior editor at Random House, where he edited a periodical of black writing entitled Amistad, producing two volumes, in 1970 and 1971. In 1971, he was responsible for the launch of Howard University Press, the first black university press in the US, and served as the first chief executive, publishing some 100 titles.

In 1986, Harris founded the independent imprint Amistad Press, specializing in publishing works by and about African Americans. Amistad was acquired by HarperCollins in 1999, and Harris remained editorial director of the imprint until 2003.

Harris died in Manhattan, New York, from colon cancer on December 16, 2015, aged 81.
